= Economy of Maharashtra =

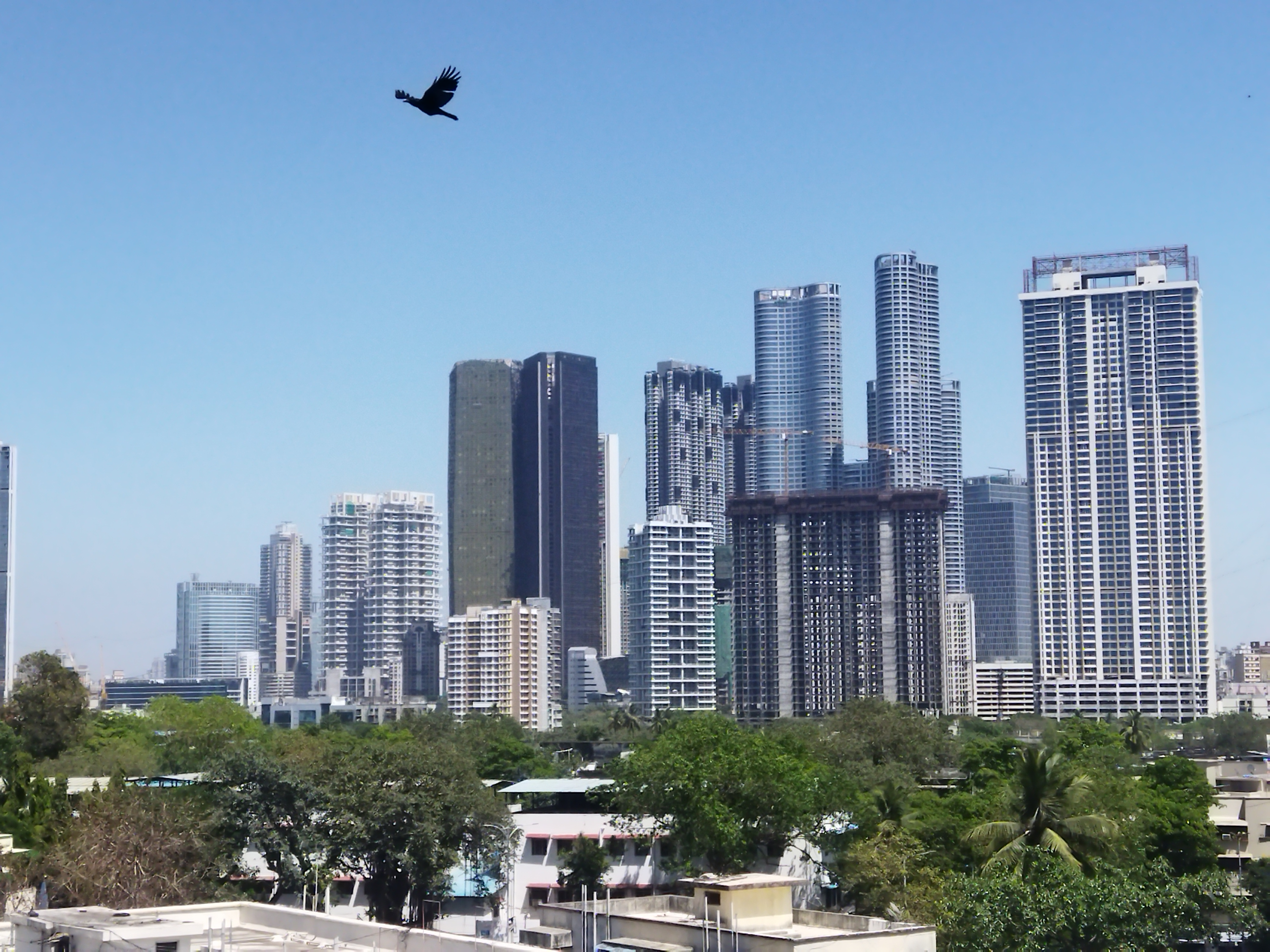
- Skyline of Mumbai, the capital of Maharashtra .
- Currency: Indian Rupee (INR, ₹)
- Fiscal year: 1 April – 31 March
- Country group: Developing/Emerging; Upper-middle income economy

Statistics
- GDP: ▲₹54.08 trillion (US$560 billion) (2026 est.)▲$2.66 trillion(PPP; 2026 est.)
- GDP rank: 1st
- GDP growth: 7.9% (2025-26 est)
- GDP per capita: ▲₹394,477 (US$4,100) (nominal; 2025-26)▲$20,520(PPP; 2026 est.)
- GDP per capita rank: 10th
- GDP by sector: Agriculture: 13.2% Industry: 26.8% Services: 60%(2020–21)
- Population below national poverty line: ▼7.81 in poverty (2022)
- Gini coefficient: 35.0 medium (2012)
- Human Development Index: ▲0.792 High (2023) (13th)
- Labour force by occupation: Agriculture 51% Industry 9% Services 40% (2015)
- Unemployment: ▼4.3% (Feb 2022)

External
- FDI stock: ₹1.85 trillion (US$19 billion) (2026-27)

Public finance
- Government debt: ▲18.35% of GSDP (2025-26 est.)
- Budget balance: ▲₹136,235 crore (US$14 billion); 2.9% of GSDP (2025-26 est.)
- Revenue: ▲₹5.63 lakh crore (US$58 billion) (2025-26 est.)
- Spending: ▲₹6.99 lakh crore (US$73 billion) (2025-26 est.)
- All values, unless otherwise stated, are in US dollars.

The economy of the State of Maharashtra is the largest in India. Maharashtra is India's most industrialised state, contributing 20% of national industrial output. Maharashtra also has software parks in many cities around the state, and is the second largest exporter of software with annual exports of over ₹80,000 crores.

Although highly industrialized, agriculture continues to be the main occupation in many regions of the state. 24.14% of the working age population is employed in agriculture and allied activities.

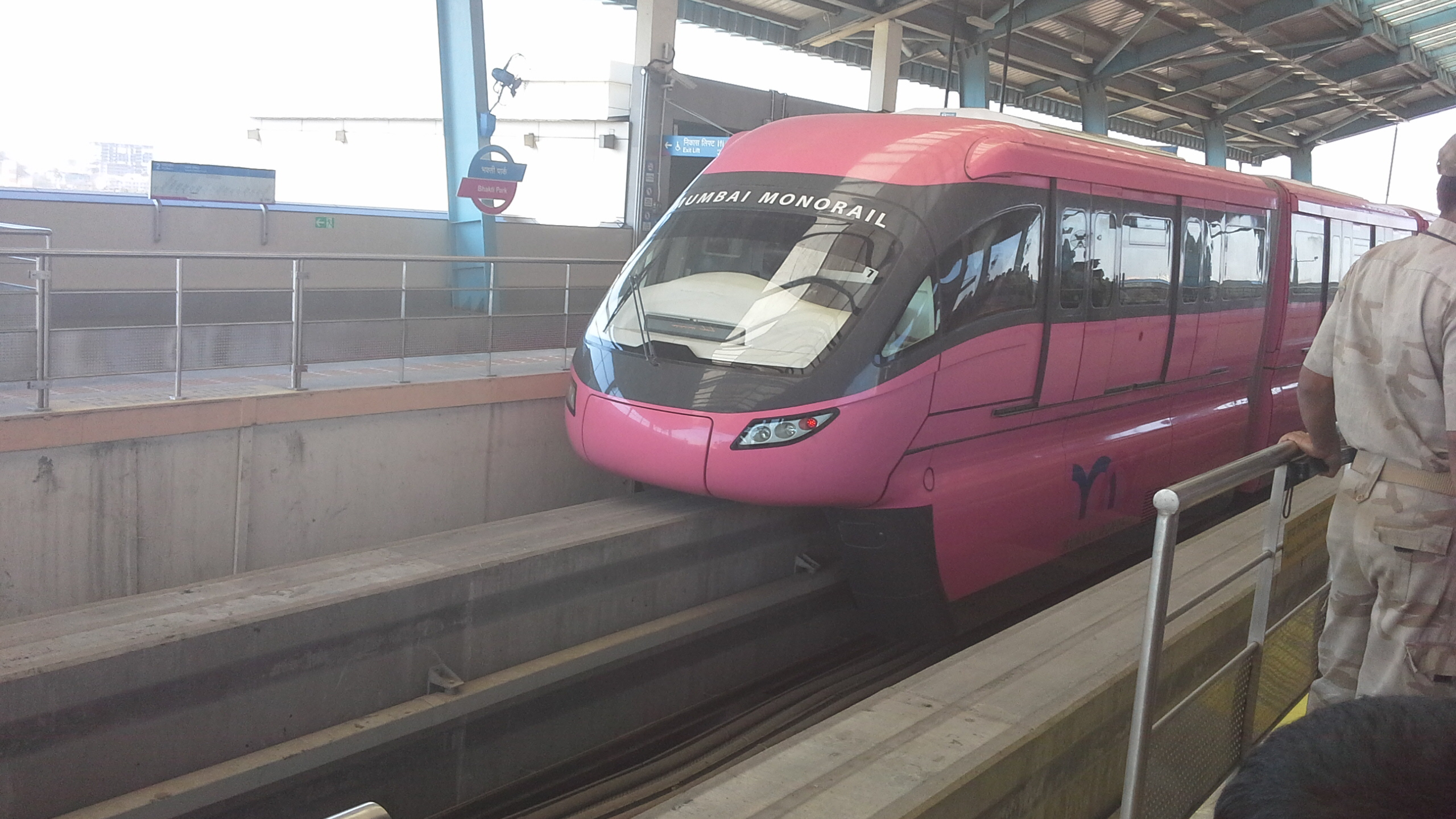
Monorail in Mumbai.

Maharashtra is divided into six divisions for administrative purposes viz. Amravati, Nagpur, Aurangabad, Konkan, Nashik, and Pune. These divisions broadly coincide with Vidarbha (Amravati & Nagpur divisions), Marathwada (Aurangabad), Western Maharashtra (Pune and Nashik divisions), Konkan (excluding Mumbai Metropolitan region), and Mumbai Metropolitan Region. The regions of Mumbai and Western Maharashtra are the most economically developed regions and account for the greatest proportion of the state's GDP.

Mumbai, the capital of Maharashtra and often described as the New York of India or Manhattan of India, is the financial capital and the most populous city of India with an estimated city proper population of 12.5 million (1.25 crore). The city is the entertainment, fashion, and commercial centre of India. Mumbai hosts the largest urban economy of any city in India. It is considered the financial capital of India with the headquarters of almost all major banks, financial institutions, insurance companies and mutual funds being based in the city. India's largest stock exchange Bombay Stock Exchange, established in 1875, is also located in the city. Over 41% of the S&P CNX 500 conglomerates have corporate offices in Maharashtra.

== Political and Economic History ==
=== Political history ===
Divisions of Maharashtra, along with their respective districts (With Palghar district formed in 2014 from the northern part of Thane district)

The British East India Company controlled Mumbai beginning in the 17th century, and used it as one of their main trading posts. The company slowly expanded areas under its rule during the 18th century. Their conquest of Maharashtra was completed in 1818 with the defeat of Peshwa Bajirao II in the Third Anglo-Maratha War.

The British governed western Maharashtra as part of the Bombay Presidency. A number of the Maratha states persisted as princely states, retaining autonomy in return for acknowledging British suzerainty. The largest princely states in the territory were Nagpur, Satara and Kolhapur; Satara was annexed to the Bombay Presidency in 1848, and Nagpur was annexed in 1853 to become Nagpur Province, later part of the Central Provinces. Berar, which had been part of the Nizam's Hyderabad State, was occupied by the British in 1853 and annexed to the Central Provinces in 1903. However, a large part called Marathwada remained part of the Nizam's Hyderabad Statee throughout the British period. The British rule of more than a century profoundly changed Maharashtra region including the economy. After Indian independence in 1947, princely states and Jagirs of the Deccan States Agency, were merged into Bombay State, which was created from the former Bombay Presidency in 1950. In 1956, the States Reorganisation Act reorganised the Indian states along linguistic lines, and Bombay Presidency State was enlarged by the addition of the predominantly Marathi-speaking regions of Marathwada (Aurangabad Division) from erstwhile Hyderabad state and Vidarbha region from the Central Provinces and Berar. The southernmost part of Bombay State was ceded to Mysore. In the 1950s, Marathi people strongly protested against bilingual Bombay state under the banner of Samyukta Maharashtra Samiti. On 1 May 1960, a separate Marathi-speaking state of Maharashtra by dividing earlier bilingual Bombay State into the new states of Maharashtra and Gujarat.

=== Economic history ===
Before British rule, the Maharashtra region was divided into many revenue divisions. The medieval equivalent of a county or district was the pargana. The chief of the pargana was called Deshmukh and record keepers were called Deshpande. The lowest administrative unit was the village. Village society in Marathi areas included the Patil or the head of the village, collector of revenue, and Kulkarni, the village record-keeper. These were hereditary positions. The village also used to have twelve hereditary servants called the Balutedar. The Balutedar system was supportive of the agriculture sector. Servants under this system provided services to the farmers and the economic system of the village. The base of this system was caste. The servants were responsible for tasks specific to their castes. There were twelve kinds of servants under Bara Balutedar In exchange for their services, the balutedars were granted complex sets of hereditary rights (watan) to a share in the village harvest under a Barter system. In the 1700s, the important cities of Maharashtra region were the trading port of Mumbai under the British, Pune as the de facto political and financial capital under Peshwa rule, and Bhosale ruled Nagpur. In the previous century, Aurangabad had been the most important city in the region as the seat of Mughal governors.

Under the British rule (1818-1947), different parts of the present day state were ruled under different systems of government, their economic development also reflected this difference. Although the British originally regarded India as a place for the supply of raw materials for the factories of England, by the end of the 19th-century a modern manufacturing industry was developing in the city of Mumbai. The main product was cotton and the bulk of the workforce in these mills was from Western Maharashtra, but more specifically from the coastal Konkan region.

The completion of The Hyderabad-Godavari Valley Railway in 1896, with a 391 miles (629 km) line from Hyderabad city to Manmad Junction opened the Nizam ruled Marathwada region to growth of industry. In the early twentieth century, the cotton industry held an important place in Nizam's Hyderabad Government as the largest export of Hyderabad State. In 1889, a cotton spinning mill and a weaving mill were erected in Aurangabad, employing a total of 700 people. In Jalna alone there were 9 cotton ginning factories and five cotton presses, with two more ginning factories at Aurangabad. The area of cultivated land under cotton in 1914 was three million acres (12,000 km^{2}) in Hyderabad state, with most of the cotton being grown in the Marathwada districts, where the soil was particularly well suited to it. In 1914 69,943 people were employed in cotton spinning, sizing, and 517,750 in weaving, cotton ginning, cleaning, and pressing. The wages paid were good, but the cost of living in Marathwara rose significantly due to the rise of the cotton industry, the uncertainty of rainfall, and availability of credit from money lenders.

Year	Gross Domestic Product (millions of INR)
1980	₹ 166,310
1985	₹ 296,160
1990	₹ 644,330
1995	₹ 1,578,180
2000	₹ 2,386,720
2005	₹ 3,759,150
2011	₹ 9,013,300
2014	₹16,866,950
2019	₹26,327,920

After the formation of Maharashtra, the state government established the Maharashtra Industrial Development Corporation (MIDC) in 1962 to spur growth in other areas of the state. In the decades since its formation, MIDC has acted as the primary industrial infrastructure development agency of the government of Maharashtra. Since its inception, MIDC has established at least one industrial area in every district of the state. The areas with biggest industrial growth were the Pune metropolitan region and areas close to Mumbai such as Thane district and Raigad district.

Maharashtra was a pioneer in the development of Agricultural Cooperative Societies after independence. In fact, it was an integral part of the then Governing Congress party's vision of 'rural development with local initiative'. A 'special' status was accorded to the sugar cooperatives and the government assumed the role of a mentor by acting as a stakeholder, guarantor and regulator. Apart from sugar, Cooperatives played a crucial role in dairy, cotton, and fertiliser industries. Support by the state government led to more than 25,000 cooperatives being set up by 1990s in Maharashtra.

In 1982, the State Government under Vasantdada Patil liberalised the Education Sector. This led to hundreds of private colleges and universities, including many religious and special-purpose institutions being set up in the state. Politicians and leaders involved in the huge cooperative movement in Maharashtra were instrumental in setting up the private institutes.

After the 1991 economic liberalization, Maharashtra began to attract foreign capital, particularly in the information technology and engineering industries. The late 1990s and first decade of the 21st century saw huge development in the Information Technology sector, and IT Parks were set up in Aundh, and Hinjawadi areas of Pune.

== Sectors ==
=== Energy production ===
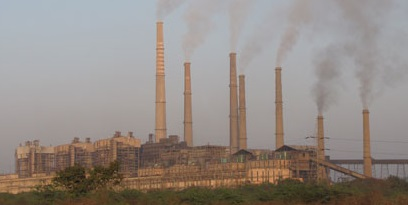
Chandrapur Super Thermal Power Station, the state's power production source

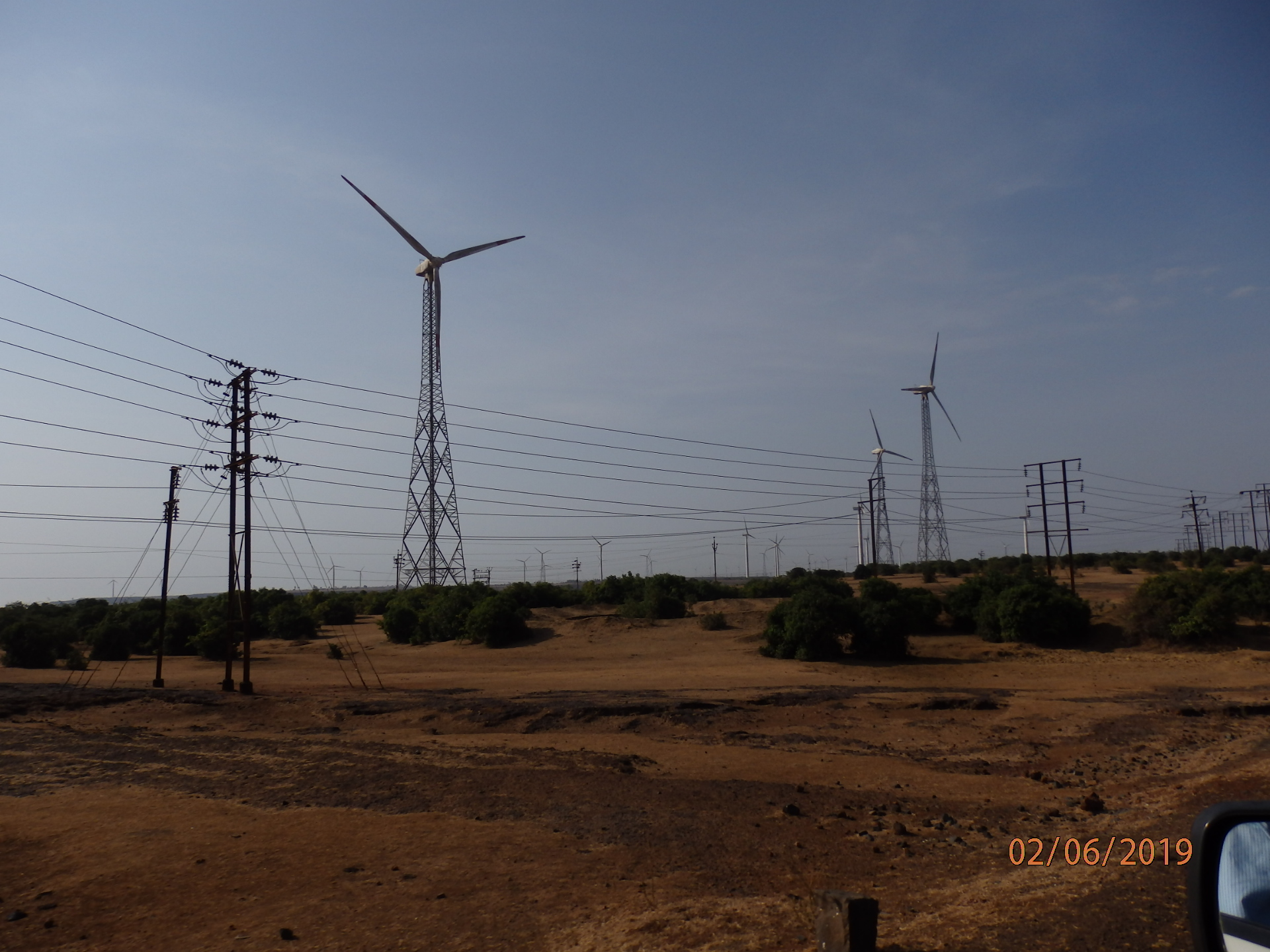
Wind Mill farm at sadawaghapur in Satara district

Although its population makes Maharashtra one of the country's largest energy users, conservation mandates, mild weather in the largest population centres and strong environmental movements have kept its per capita energy use to one of the lowest of any Indian state. The high electricity demand of the state constitutes 13% of the total installed electricity generation capacity in India, which is mainly from fossil fuels such as coal and natural gas. There are large coal production facilities in Chandrapur district. The Vidarbha region of the state is known to have significant coal reserves. Mumbai High, the offshore oilfield 165 kilometres (103 mi) off the coast of Mumbai, accounts for a significant percentage of the total crude oil production in India.

Nuclear and renewable sources such as hydroelectricity, wind, solar, and biomass make a smaller contribution to electricity generation capability in the state. A number of sugar mills use bagasse cogeneration to produce electricity for the mill use and surplus for the grid.

Maharashtra is the largest power generating state in India, with installed electricity generation capacity of 44 thousand MW. The state forms a major constituent of the western grid of India, which now comes under the North, East, West and North Eastern (NEWNE) grids of India. Maharashtra Power Generation Company (MAHAGENCO) operates thermal power plants. In addition to the state government-owned power generation plants, there are privately owned power generation plants that transmit power through the Maharashtra State Electricity Transmission Company, which is responsible for transmission of electricity in the state.

There are a number of hydroelectric projects, particularly in the western Maharashtra districts of Pune, Satara and Kolhapur. Koyna Hydroelectric Project in the district of Satara is the largest by generation capacity in the state. The state also has strong potential for wind generated electricity, and is one of the leading states in generated wind power.

Mahavitaran (Maharashtra State Electricity Distribution Company Limited) is responsible for distribution of electricity throughout the state by buying power from Mahanirmiti, captive power plants, other state electricity boards and private sector power generation companies. Some areas of Mumbai get their electricity from private sector companies such as Brihanmumbai Electric Supply and Transport, Tata Power and Adani Electricity Mumbai Limited are electricity distributors.

=== Agriculture ===
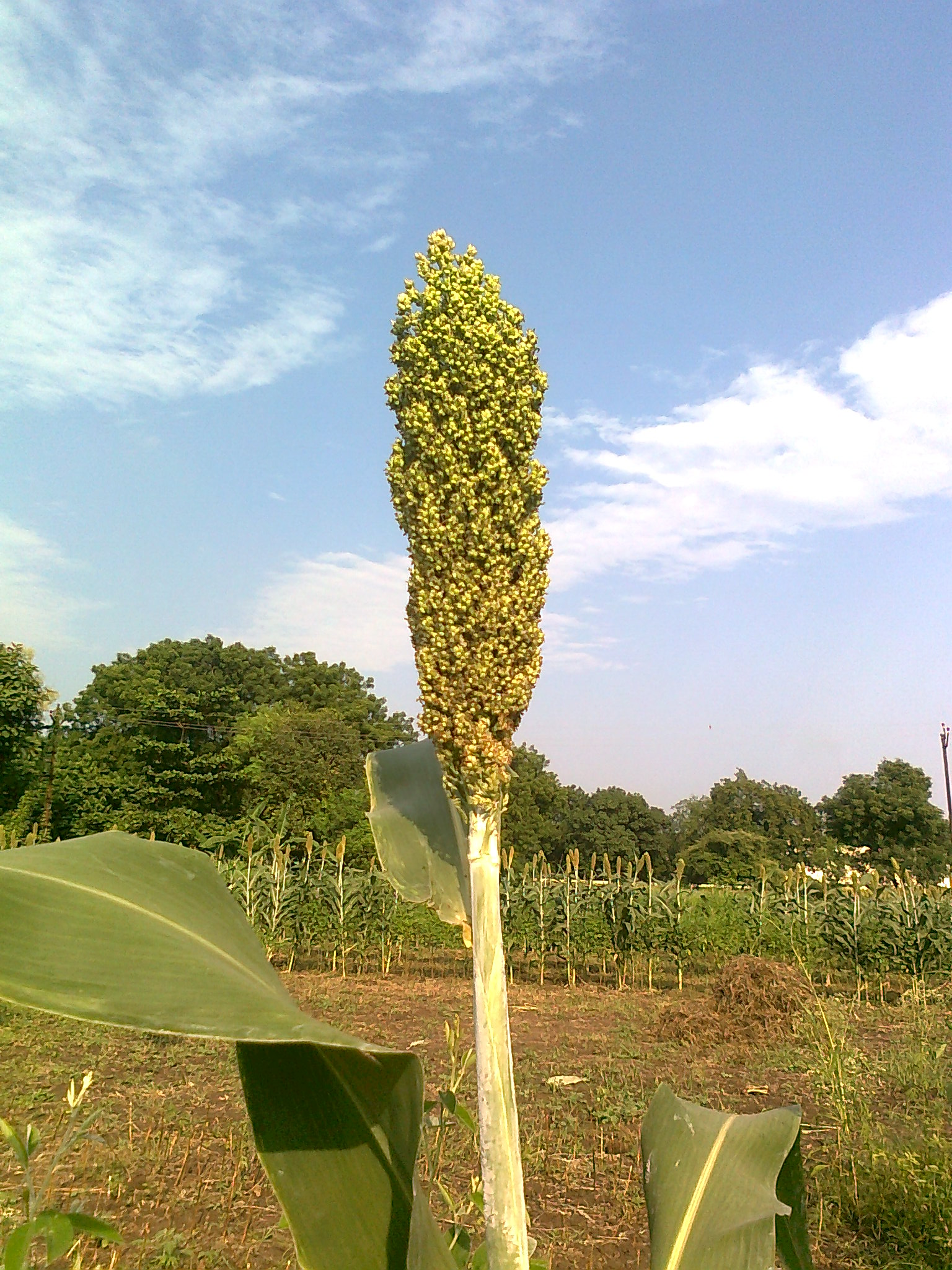
Sorghum farm at Chinawal village in Maharashtra

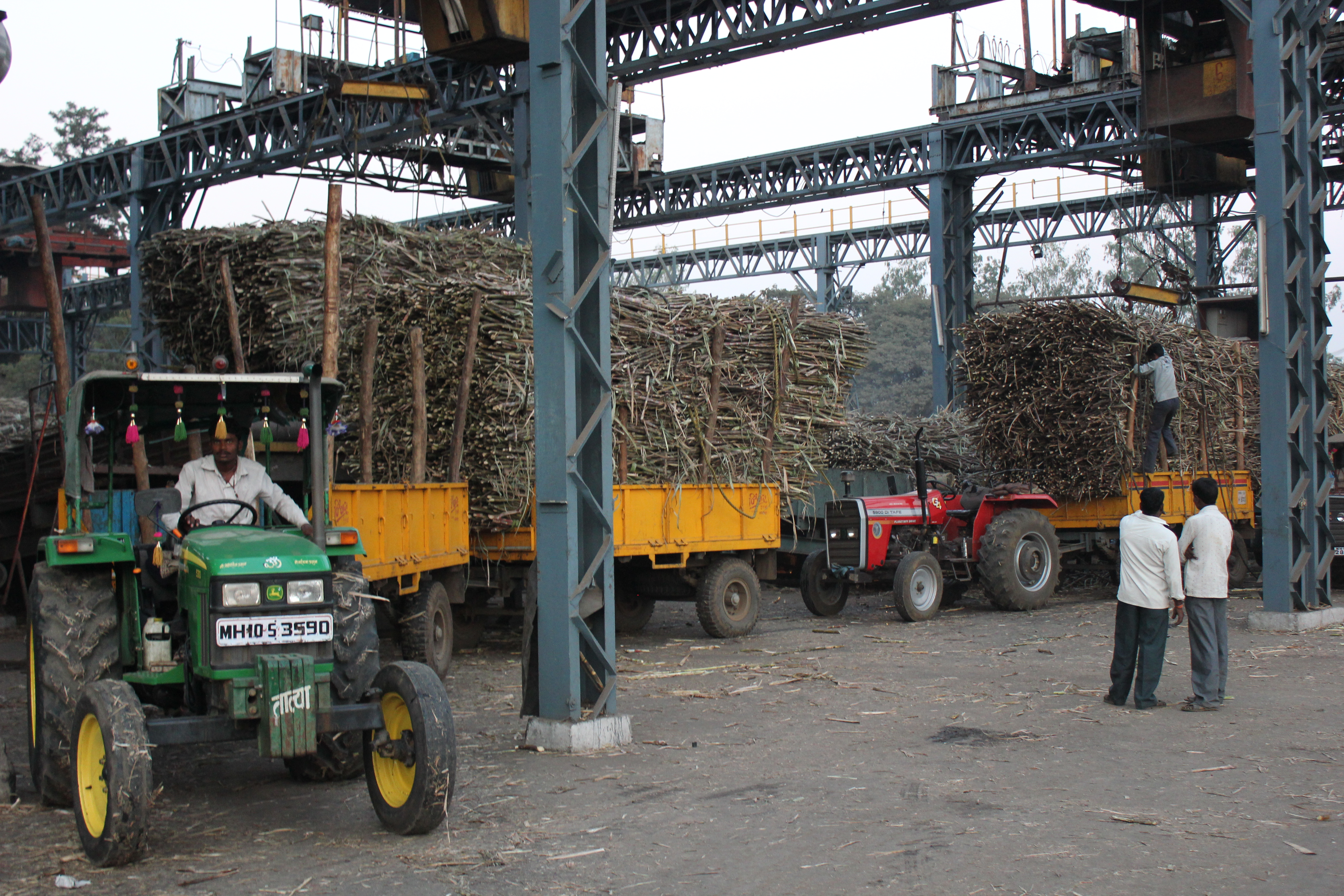
Sugarcane weighing at a Cooperative Sugar mill in Maharashtra, India.

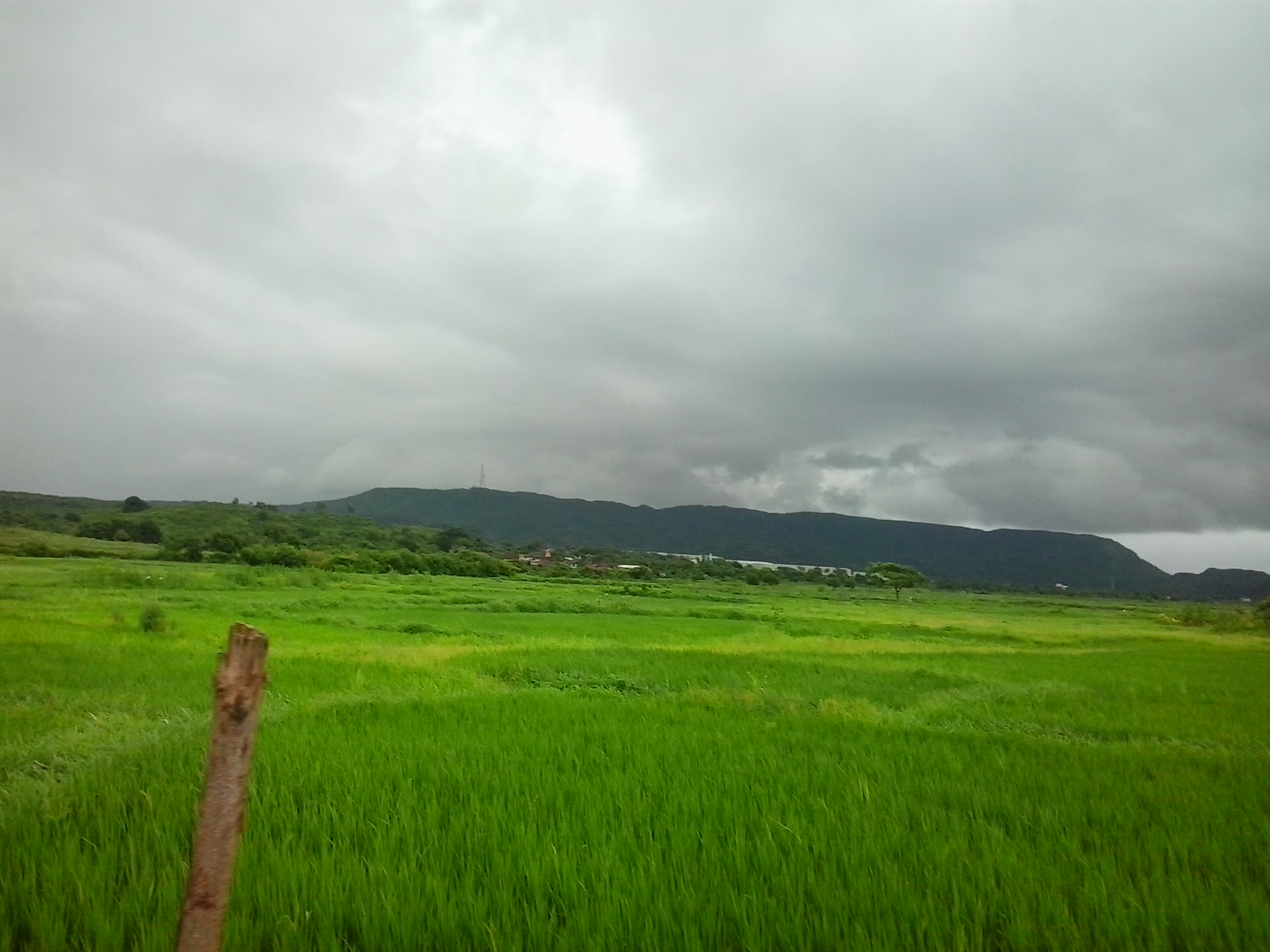
Paddy field near the village of Dhakti Jui in the Konkan region

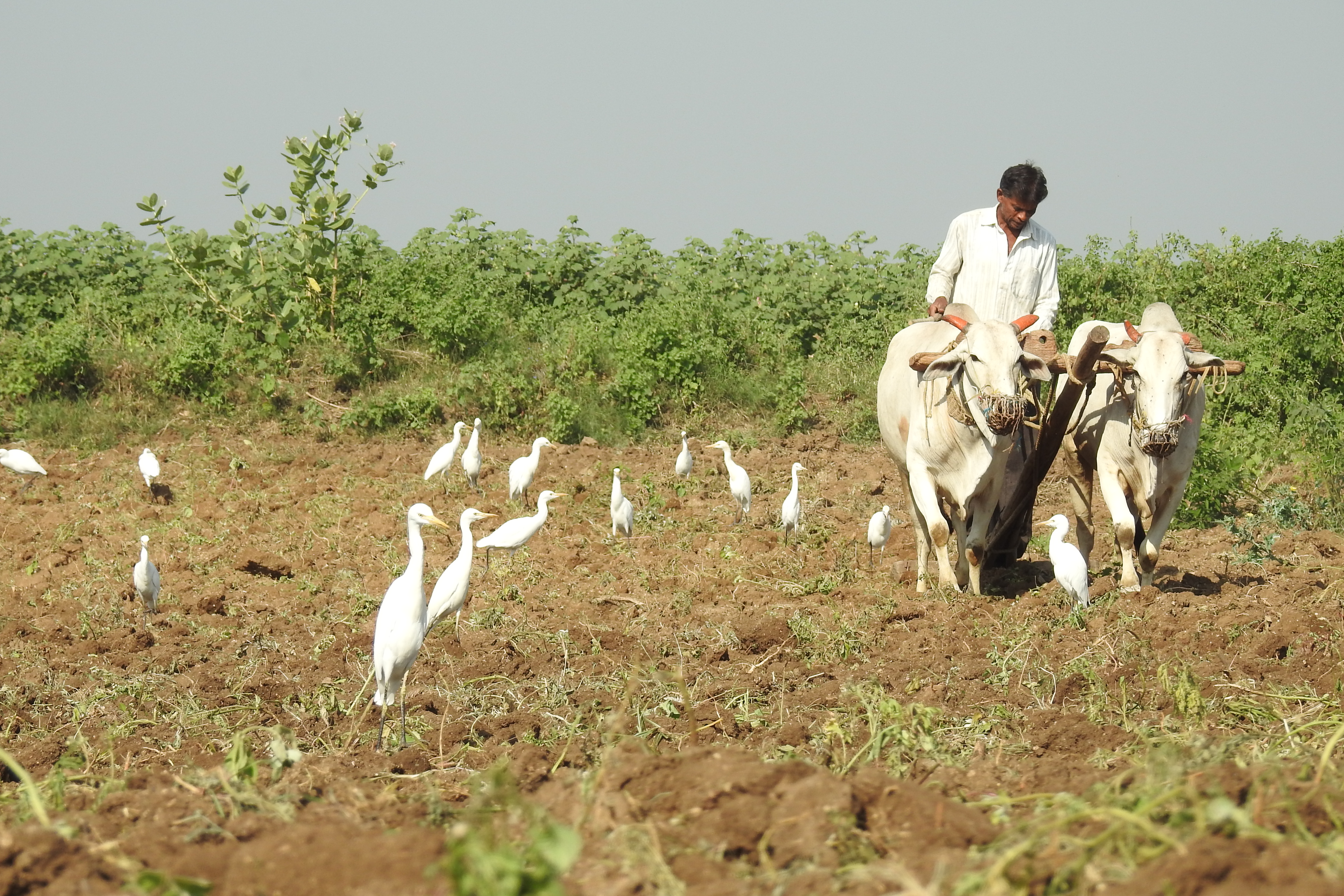
Ploughing in Yavatmal district

Historically, India has classified and tracked its economy and GDP in three sectors: agriculture, industry, and services. Agriculture includes crops, horticulture, milk and animal husbandry, aquaculture, fishing, sericulture, aviculture, forestry, and related activities.

Although Maharashtra is a highly industrialized state of India, agriculture continues to be the main occupation in the state. Since most of the cultivable land is still rain-fed, the Southwest Monsoon season between June and September is critical to the food sufficiency and quality of life in the state. Therefore, the agricultural calendar of Maharashtra and other parts of India is governed by Monsoon. Any fluctuations in the time distribution, spatial distribution or quantity of the monsoon rains may lead to conditions of floods or droughts causing the agricultural sector to adversely suffer. This has a cascading effect on the secondary economic sectors, the overall economy, food inflation and therefore the overall quality and cost of living for the general population. Many areas in Western Maharashtra on the Deccan plateau such as eastern Pune district, Solapur, Sangli, Satara and Ahmadnagar and the Marathwada region are particularly prone to drought. Just like the rest of India, land holdings tend to remain small and the percent of marginal farmers (landholding of less than 1.0 hectare (2.5 acre)) was 43%. The average holding over all size groups was under three hectares. Recent years have seen a huge increase in farmers committing suicide in Maharashtra because of indebtedness resulting from monsoon failure, climate change, and at times cost of growing crops being higher than the market price. The cause for suicide has been linked in some studies to inability to loans mostly taken from banks and NBFCs to purchase expensive seeds and fertilizers, often marketed by foreign MNCs.

Irrigation facilities are being extended so that agriculture could be made less dependent upon rain water. Maharashtra has by far the largest number of Dams in India. Despite that, the net irrigated area totalled only 33,500 square kilometres or about 16% of cultivable land in 2009.

Principal Monsoon crops include millets such as jwari, Bajri, and Finger millet. These have been grown in the region for thousands of years. In the high rain fall areas of Konkan and the eastern foothills of the Sahyadri mountains, different varieties of rice are cultivated. Other crops include wheat, pulses, vegetables and onions. Maharashtra lags behind in the productivity of all the crops as compared to the Indian national averages, which itself lags behind the averages of more progressive countries in Europe and Asia.

The main cash crops include cotton, sugarcane, turmeric, and several oil seeds including groundnut, sunflower and soybean. The state has huge areas under fruit cultivation of which mangoes, bananas, grapes, pomegranate and oranges are the main ones.

The state is a significant producer of milk. The milk is primarily obtained from water buffalo, crossbred cattle, and indigenous cattle respectively. Unlike some southern states in India, in Maharashtram, water buffalo and indigenous cattle account for bulk of milk production. The Pandharpuri is a popular buffalo breed in the state. Zebu and Gir are popular dairy cattle. Jersey and Holstein are the European breeds used for crossbreeding indigenous cattle. Although half of the milk is consumed by the owners, the other half is marketed and processed through a combination of small-scale vendors, private companies and dairy cooperatives. Cattle is extensively used for agricultural work, with popular breeds including Khillar, Deoni, Gaolao, Red Kandhari and Dangi. These breeds offer strong draught power capacity, heat tolerance, disease resistance, adaptability to harsh agro-climatic conditions and ability to survive and perform under scarce feed and fodder.

Maharashtra was a pioneer in the development of Agricultural Cooperative Societies after independence. In fact, it was an integral part of the then Governing Congress party's vision of 'rural development with local initiative'. A 'special' status was accorded to the sugar cooperatives and the government assumed the role of a mentor by acting as a stakeholder, guarantor and regulator, Cooperatives play a crucial role in dairy, cotton, and fertiliser industries. The members of the respective society include all farmers, small and large, supplying their produce to the processing mill, dairy etc. As with dairy and sugar, cooperatives play a significant part in marketing of fruit and vegetables in Maharashtra. Since the 1980s, the amount of produce handled by Cooperative societies has increased exponentially. Common fruit and vegetables marketed by the societies include products such as bananas, mangoes, grapes, onions and many others. Over the last fifty years, the local sugar mills and other cooperative bodies have played a crucial part in encouraging political participation and as a stepping stone for aspiring politicians.

Maharashtra and Karnataka have been at the forefront of obtaining Geographical indications for a variety of fruit, vegetables, and other crops in the state. Agricultural products on the list from Maharashtra includes Chiku of Gholvad, Nagpur oranges, Nashik grapes, Mahabaleshwar strawberry, Waghya Ghevada (a French bean variety) of Satara district, Jalgaon eggplant, Ambemohar rice etc.

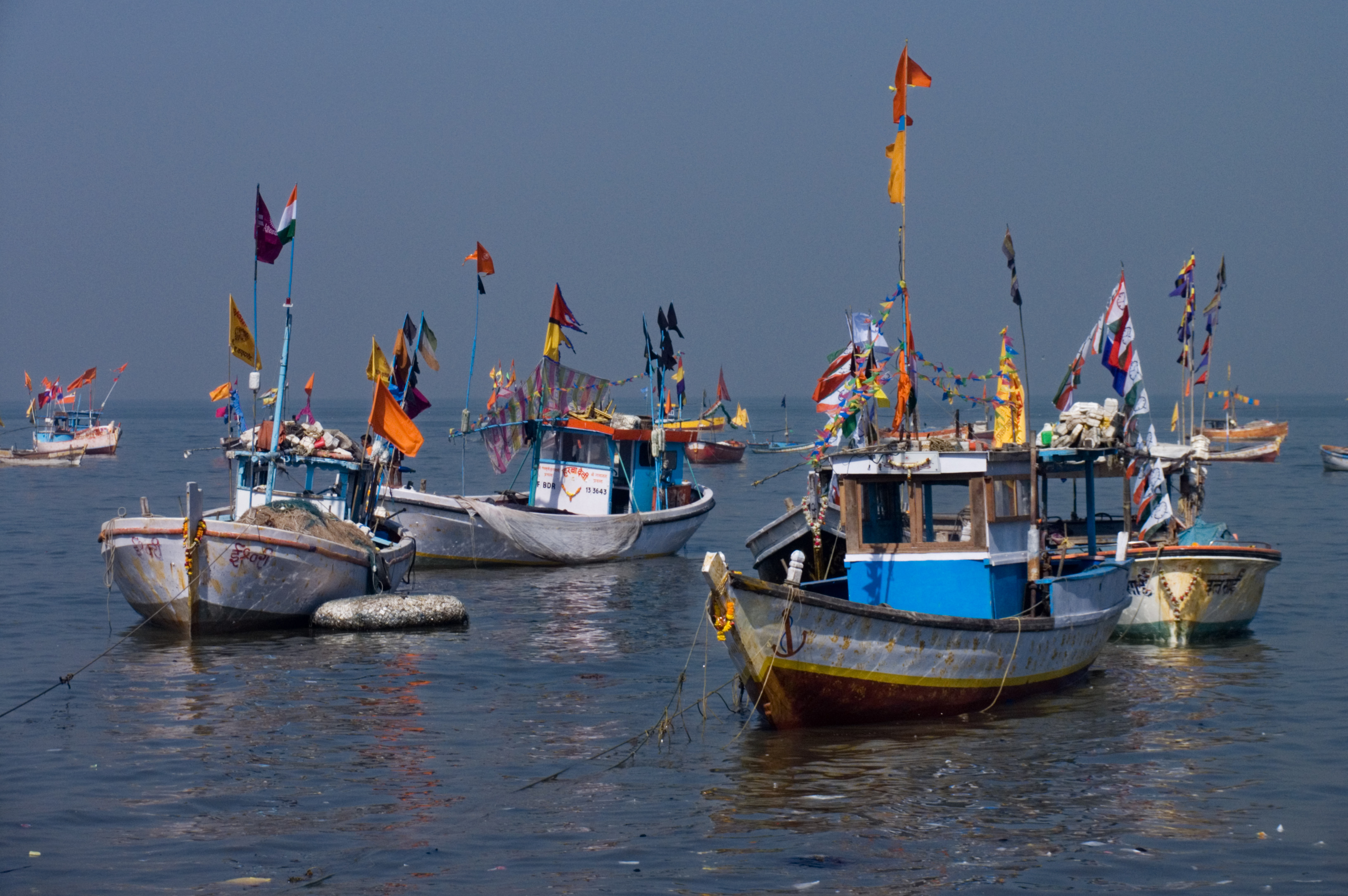
Fishing boats in Mumbai

Maharashtra, with a coastline of 720 km, is one of the leading states in India in marine fish production. Major fish landing centres are New Ferry Wharf, Sassoon Dock and Versova, situated in Mumbai metropolitan area, and they account for nearly 60% of the state fish landings. In year 2017–18, the production was 475,000 metric tons from fish caught in the Arabian sea off coastal Konkan region of the state.

As part of its sustainability efforts, the state has started a project for the identification of suitable plantation sites for Jatropha, a drought resistance plant. The village of Ralegaon Siddhi in Ahmednagar District is heralded as a sustainable model of village development.

=== Manufacturing Industry ===
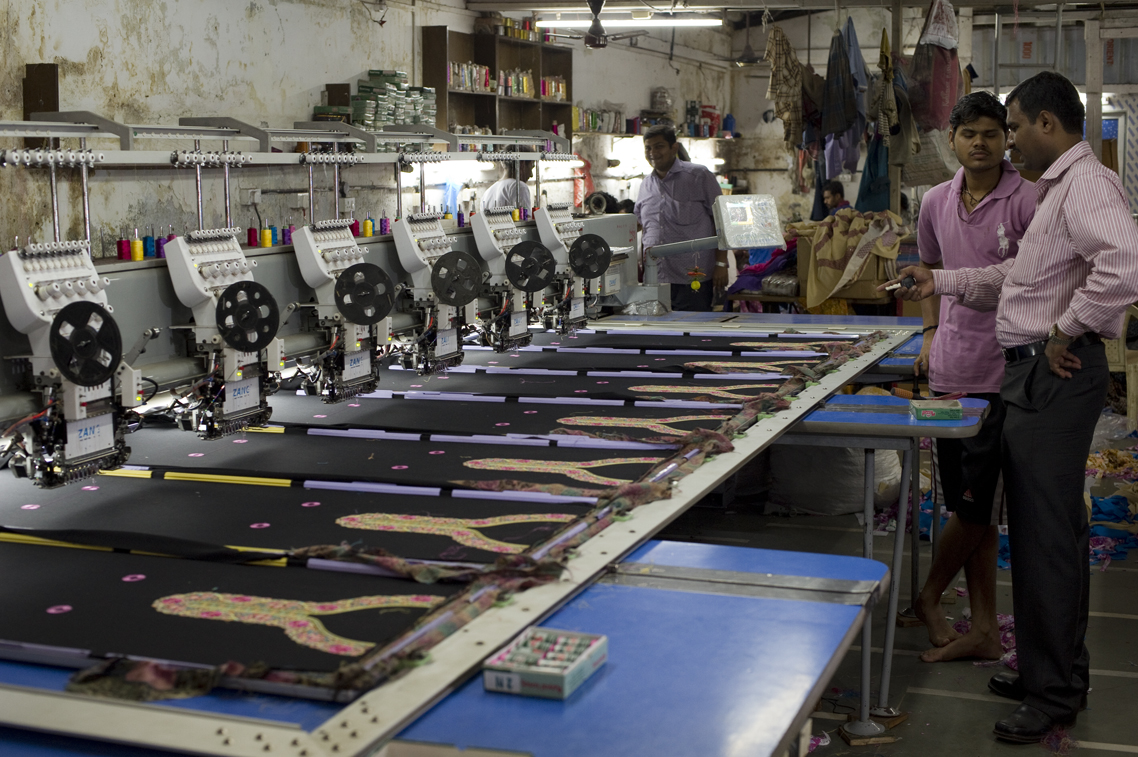
An embroidery unit, one of the many small scale industrial companies, in Dharavi, Mumbai.

Maharashtra is India's leading industrial state contributing 18.4% of national industrial output in 2013. Almost 46% of the GSDP is contributed by industry. Western Maharashtra around the metropolitan areas around Mumbai and Pune account for a significant percentage industrial output.

To attract industries to different areas of the state, the government of Maharashtra established Maharashtra Industrial Development Corporation (MIDC) in 1962. MIDC facilitates manufacturing business by creating Special economic zones that have infrastructure such as land (open plot or built-up spaces), roads, water supply, drainage facilities, etc. To date, 233 areas have been developed around the state with an emphasis on different sectors such as manufacturing, IT, pharmaceutical and wine.

Maharashtra has had a long history in textiles with Mumbai being the original home of India's textile mills. Solapur, Ichalkaranji, Malegaon and Bhiwandi are some of the cities known for the textile industry today. Pharmaceuticals, petrochemicals, heavy chemicals, electronics, automobiles, engineering, food processing, and plastics are some of the major industries in the state. Maharashtra is renowned for the production of three-wheelers, jeeps, commercial vehicles and cars, synthetic fibers, cold rolled products and industrial alcohol. Pune is emerging as one of the largest automobile hubs in the country. The state capital Mumbai and the Mumbai Metropolitan Region has historically been the most industrialized area in the state. Industrial development in the state is largely concentrated in the Pune Metropolitan Area, Nashik, Aurangabad and Nagpur. The six important industries in the state are cotton textiles, chemicals, machinery, electricals, transport, and metallurgy.

=== Information and Media ===
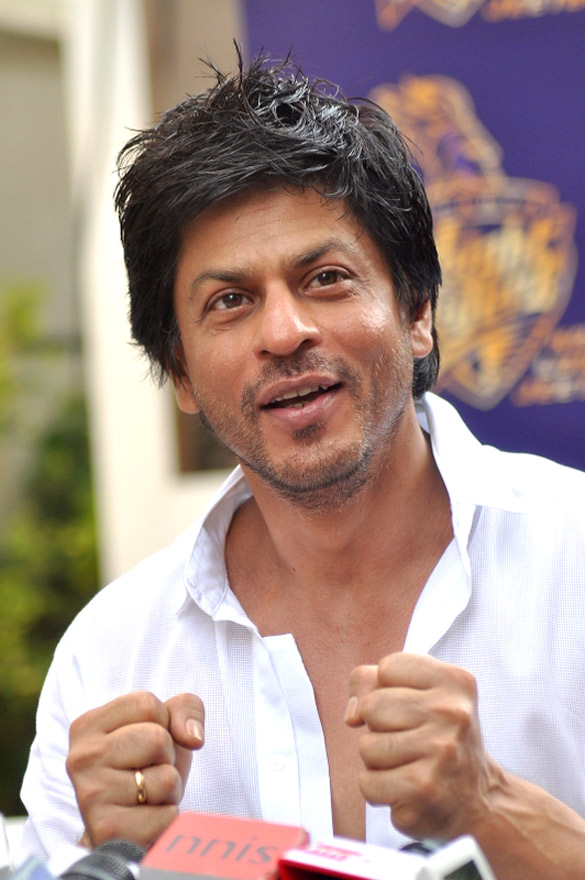
Shahrukh Khan, one of the biggest stars of Mumbai film industry.

Maharashtra is the leading Indian state for many Creative industries including advertising, architecture, art, crafts, design, fashion, film, music, performing arts, publishing, R&D, software, toys and games, TV and radio, and video games.

Maharashtra is a prominent location for the Indian entertainment industry, with many films, television series, books, and other media being set there. Mumbai is the largest centre for film and television production and a third of all Indian films are produced in the state. Multimillion-dollar Bollywood productions, with the most expensive costing up to ₹1.5 billion (US$16 million), are filmed there. Marathi film used to be previously made primarily in Kolhapur, but now are produced in Mumbai.

=== Service Sector ===
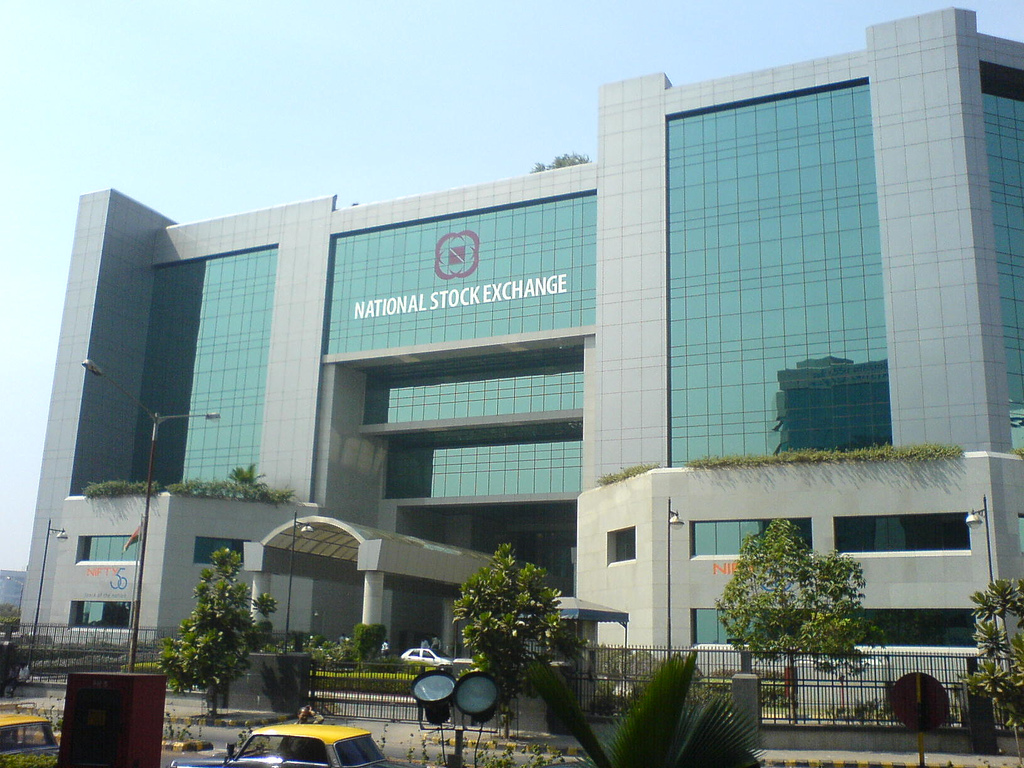
National Stock Exchange of India in Mumbai

The Service sector dominates the economy of Maharashtra, accounting for 61.4% of the value addition and 69.3% of the value of output in the state. The service sector includes traditional fields such as education, health, transport, real estate, banking and insurance as well as newer sectors such as information technology.

==== Banking and finance ====
Mumbai, the capital of state and the financial capital of India, houses the corporate headquarters of numerous Indian companies, multinational corporations, and financial institutions. India's main stock exchanges and capital market and commodity exchanges are located in Mumbai. These include the Reserve Bank of India, the Bombay Stock Exchange, the National Stock Exchange of India, the SEBI. The State continues to attract industrial investments from domestic as well as foreign institutions. Share markets in the state transact almost 70 per cent of the country's stocks.

Maharashtra is one of the leading states in cooperative urban and rural banking. The state's urban cooperative banks in 2007 accounted for 40% of the sector in India and majority of the deposits.

=== Wholesale and retail trade ===
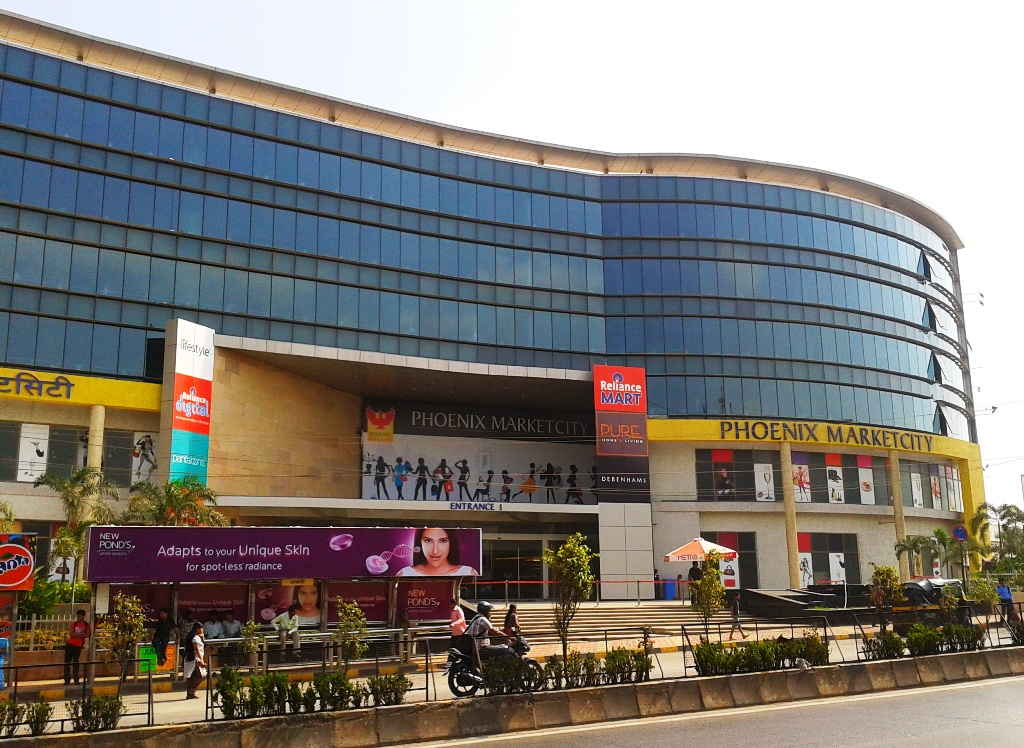
A Phoenix Marketcity mall in Kurla, Mumbai

The retail scenario in the state consists of both organized and unorganized sectors. The organized sector includes supermarkets, hypermarkets, departmental stores, malls and other privately owned retail chains. The unorganized includes mainly the family owned and operated local grocery stores, convenience stores, vegetable markets, and hawkers. The unorganized sector dominates retail trade and is preferred by the consumers. Online shopping is becoming popular in India with Maharashtra, and particularly the city of Mumbai, leading the nation.

=== Education and Training ===
The literacy rate in the state was 88.69% in 2011. Of this, male literacy stood at 92.12% and female literacy 75.75%.

- Primary and secondary level

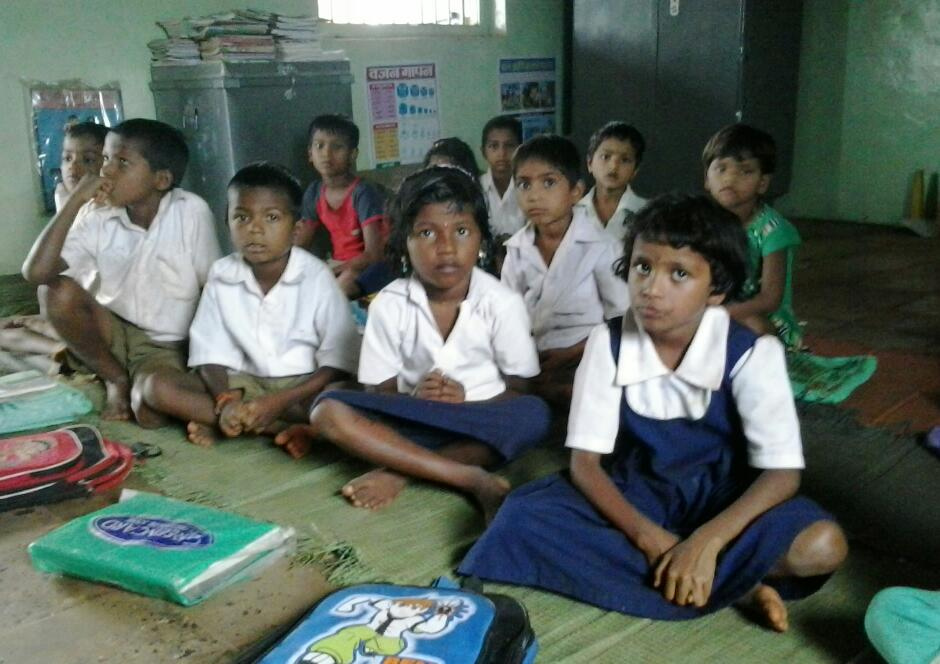
Students at a state-run primary school in Raigad district.

Maharashtra schools are run by the state government or by private organisations, including religious institutions. It is mandatory for local authorities to provide primary education under state law. However, secondary education is an optional duty. Public primary schools in the rural and urban are run by the area Zilla Parishad or the municipal corporations respectively. Private schools are run mainly by education trusts and are required to undergo mandatory inspection by the concerned authorities. Private schools are eligible for financial aid from the state government.

The secondary schools are affiliated with the Council for the Indian School Certificate Examinations (CISCE), the Central Board for Secondary Education (CBSE), the National Institute of Open School (NIOS) or the Maharashtra State Board of Secondary and Higher Secondary Education. Under the 10+2+3 plan, after completing secondary school, students typically enroll for two years in a junior college, also known as pre-university, or in schools with a higher secondary facility affiliated with the Maharashtra State Board of Secondary and Higher Secondary Education or any central board. Students choose from one of three streams, namely liberal arts, commerce or science. Upon completing the required coursework, students may enroll in general or professional degree programs. Instruction in schools is mainly in Marathi, English or Hindi, though instruction in other languages such as Urdu, Gujarati or Kannada is also offered if there is sufficient local demand. Private schools vary in their choice of curriculum and may follow the State Board or one of the two central boards of education, the CBSE or CISCE.

- Tertiary level

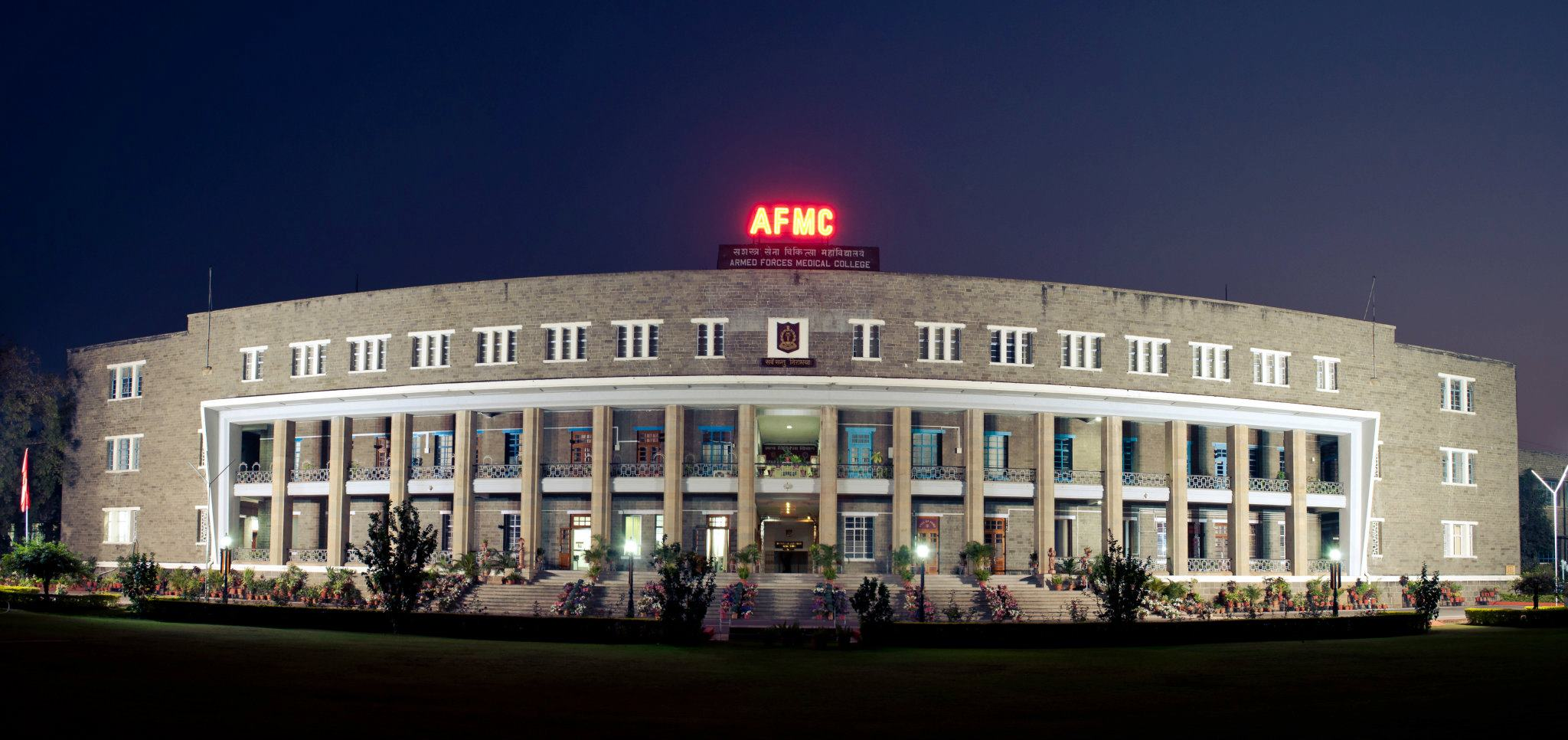
Armed Forces Medical College, Pune, was one of the institutions established after the Indian independence movement

Maharashtra has 24 universities with a turnout of 160,000 Graduates every year. The University of Mumbai, is the largest university in the world in terms of the number of graduates and has 141 affiliated colleges. According to prominent national rankings, many Maharashtra colleges and universities are ranked among highest in India. Maharashtra is also home many autonomous institutes as Indian Institute of Technology Bombay. Most of these autonomous institutes are ranked the highest in India and have very competitive entry requirements. Pune has historically been known as a center for higher education and has been referred to as the "Oxford of the East". In 2006, it was reported that nearly 200,000 students from across India study in Pune at nine universities and more than a hundred educational institutes. The state has hundreds of other private colleges and universities, including many religious and special-purpose institutions. Most of the private colleges were set up in the last thirty years after the State Government of Vasantdada Patil liberalised the Education Sector in 1982. Although private, the government plays a regulatory role in the operations of these colleges. Politicians and leaders involved in the huge cooperative movement in Maharashtra were instrumental in setting up many private institutes. The growth of IT clusters in the state has led to a corresponding increase in setting up engineering colleges to cater for the demand for skilled labor in areas where the clusters are located such as Pune.

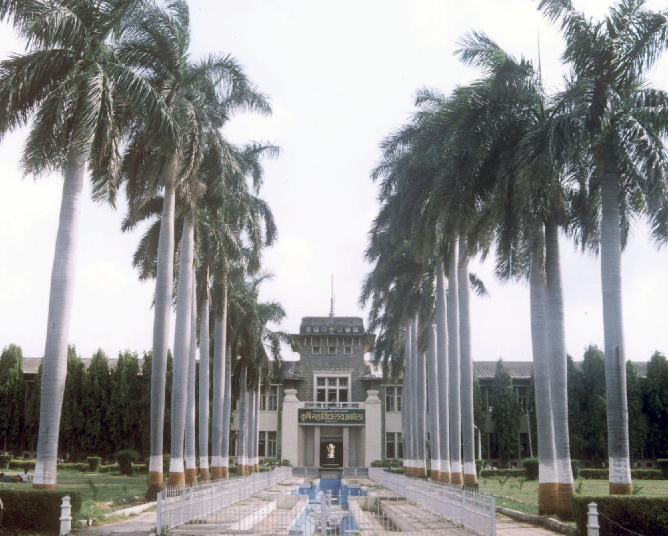
Panjabrao Deshmukh Krishi Vidyapeeth (Agricultural university) at Akola

The state also has four agricultural universities located in different regions of state. There are also many regional universities that higher education needs at the district levels of the state. Apart from this, there are a number of deemed universities in the state. There are also local community colleges with generally more open admission policies, shorter academic programs, and lower tuition.

- Vocational training

There are a total of 416 ITIs and 310 ITCs with an intake of approximately 1,50,000 (1,13,644 in ITIs and 35,512 in ITCs) students. The state has 416 post-secondary school industrial training institutes (ITIs) run by the government and 310 Industrial Training Centres (ITC) run by private entities that offer vocational training in numerous trades such as construction, plumbing, welding, automobile mechanic etc. Successful candidates receive the National Trade Certificate. In 2012 approximately 1,50,000 (1,13,644 in ITIs and 35,512 in ITCs) students were enrolled in programs run by these organizations.

=== Transport ===
Mumbai has been the major port in Maharashtra with flourishing trade and industrial development since 17th century A.D. Major national highways, railways pass through state, aiding in fast movement of goods and people. The state has also added to the road network connecting district places to major trading ports and cities. Mumbai, Pune and Nagpur are the major airports in the state. Mumbai's Chhatrapati Shivaji Maharaj International Airport was recorded as the busiest single runway airport in the world. Two new airports, one each in Navi Mumbai and Pune are proposed to be constructed.

- Road Transport

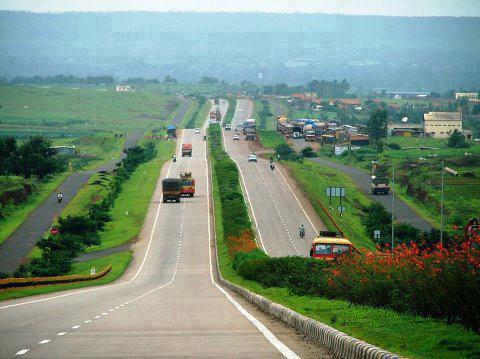
NH3, the highway that connects Mumbai and Nashik

The state has a large, multi-modal transportation system with the largest road network in India. In 2011, the total length of surface road in Maharashtra was 267,452 km; national highways comprised 4,176 km and state highways 3,700 km. Other district roads and village roads provide villages accessibility to meet their social needs as well as the means to transport agricultural produce from villages to nearby markets. Major district roads provide a secondary function of linking between main roads and rural roads. Almost 98% of villages are connected via the highways and modern roads in Maharashtra. Average speed on state highways varies between 50 and 60 km/h (31–37 mi/h) due to heavy presence of vehicles; in villages and towns, speeds are as low as 25–30 km/h (15–18 mi/h). The national highways get funding from the central government, however, state highways and local roads rely on the state government. Lack of funding has led Maharashtra government to rely on the private sector to fund state highways.

The Maharashtra State Road Transport Corporation (MSRTC) provides economical and reliable passenger road transport service in the public sector. These buses, popularly called ST (State Transport), are the preferred mode of transport for much of the populace. Hired forms of transport include metered taxis and auto rickshaws, which often ply specific routes in cities.

The Mumbai–Nagpur Expressway or Samruddhi Mahamarg (officially known as Hindu Hrudaysamrat Balasaheb Thackeray Maharashtra Samruddhi Mahamarg) and Maharashtra Expressway-2 (ME-2), is a 6-lane wide (expandable to 8), 701-km long access-controlled expressway in Maharashtra, India. It is amongst the country's longest greenfield road projects,[4] which will connect the two capital cities of the state, its capital, Mumbai, and its third-largest and alternate capital city, Nagpur.

- Railways

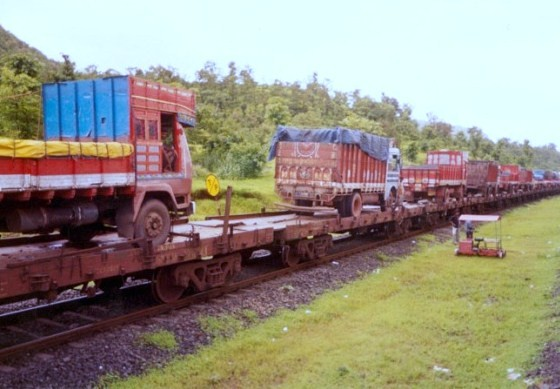
A RORO train at the Sawantwadi Road railway station

Indian government owned Indian Railways runs Rail network in Maharashtra as well as the rest of the country. The state is well-connected to other parts of the country with a railway network spanning 5,983 km between four Railways.

- The Central Railway and the Western Railway zones of the Indian Railways that are headquartered in Mumbai, at Chhatrapati Shivaji Terminus and Churchgate respectively,
- The Nagpur Junction has the division, Nagpur (Central) & Nagpur (South East Central) of Central Railway & South East Central Railway respectively.
- The Nanded division of the South Central Railway that caters to the Marathwada region of Maharashtra and
- The Konkan Railway, a subsidiary of the Indian Railways based in CBD Belapur, Navi Mumbai that serves the Konkan coastal region of Maharashtra and continues down the west coast of India.

The rail network is used for carrying freight and people but a greater percentage of freight is carried by trucks than by rail.

- Passenger rail

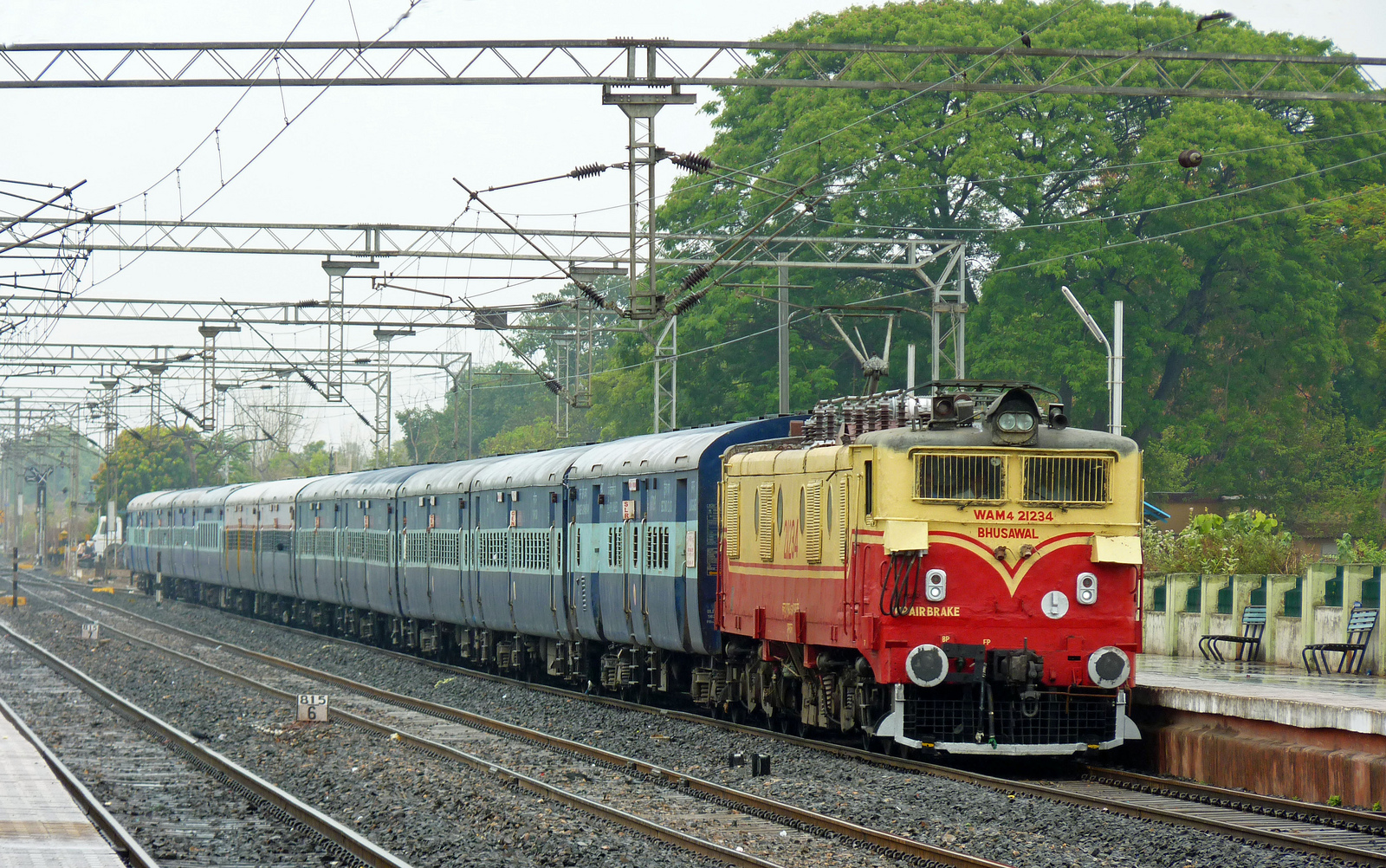
Nagpur - Bhusawal SF Express

There are multiple train services that connect major cities of India to cities in Maharashtra, for example, the Mumbai Rajdhani Express, the fastest rajdhani train, connects the Indian capital of New Delhi to Mumbai. There are also many services that connect cities within Maharashtra such as the Deccan Queen connecting Mumbai with Pune. The Maharashtra Express service which connects the city of Kolhapur in southwestern Maharashtra to Gondia in Northeast Maharashtra holds the current record for the longest distance covered in one state as its entire run of 1,346 km (836 mi) is entirely within Maharashtra. Thane and CST are the busiest railway stations in India, the latter serving as a terminal for both long-distance trains and commuter trains of the Mumbai Suburban Railway.

Maharashtra also has suburban railway networks in Mumbai and Pune that carry around 6.4 million passengers every day using the same tracks that are used by long-distance passenger and freight trains.

- Sea ports

The two principal sea ports, Mumbai Port and JNP (also called Nhava Sheva), which is also in the Mumbai region, are under the control and supervision of the government of India. Roughly one of every four shipping containers passing through India is loaded or unloaded at JNP. The flow of containers has roughly tripled between 2003 and 2023, reaching the equivalent of 6.4 million 20-foot boxes last year. Despite this volume, by the standards of the world's largest ports — many of them in China — JNP remains a small operation. There are around 48 minor ports in Maharashtra. Most of these handle passenger traffic and have a limited capacity. None of the major rivers in Maharashtra are navigable and so river transport does not exist in the state.

- Air transport

Almost all the major cities of Maharashtra have airports. CSIA (formerly Bombay International Airport) and Juhu Airport are the two airports in Mumbai. The two other international airports are Pune International Airport and Dr. Babasaheb Ambedkar International Airport (Nagpur). While Aurangabad Airport is a domestic airport operated by Airports Authority of India. Flights are operated by both private and government airline companies. Nashik Airport is also a major airport. Most of the State's airfields are operated by the Airports Authority of India (AAI) while Reliance Airport Developers (RADPL), currently operate five non-metro airports at Latur, Nanded, Baramati, Osmanabad and Yavatmal on a 95-year lease. The Maharashtra Airport Development Company (MADC) was set up in 2002 to take up development of airports in the state that are not under the AAI or the Maharashtra Industrial Development Corporation (MIDC). MADC is playing the lead role in the planning and implementation of the Multi-modal International Cargo Hub and Airport at Nagpur (MIHAN) project. Additional smaller airports include Akola, Amravati, Chandrapur, Dhule, Gondia, Jalgaon, Karad, Kolhapur, Nashik Road, Ratnagiri, and Solapur.

=== Tourism ===
Tourism is a major industry in Maharashtra with areas around Aurangabad, Mumbai and Pune. Places of interest include ancient caves and monuments at Ajanta, Ellora, Elephanta and Karle-Bhaje, numerous mountain forts from the Maratha empire era such as Raigad, Sinhagad, Rajgad, Shivneri, Panhala, British era hill stations such as Lonavala, Khandala, Mahabaleshwar, and Matheran, tiger reserves such as Melghat, Nagzira, and Tadoba, and national parks such as Navegaon Bandh.

Religious tourism includes places such as Shirdi (Saibaba temple), Nashik (Hindu holy place), Nanded (Gurdwara), Nagpur (Dikshabhomi), Siddhivinayak temple and Haji Ali Dargah in Mumbai and Pandharpur (Vitthal-Rukmini temple) as well as the five Jyotirlingas out of eleven and Shakta pithas such as Kolhapur (Mahalakshmi Temple).

Numerous beaches, adventure tourism sites, amusement parks, and water parks also add to the tourism in the state.

== State Government revenue and spending ==
Article 246 of the Indian Constitution, distributes legislative powers including taxation, between the Parliament of India and the State Legislature.

The constitution does not have provision for the central government and the States to have concurrent power of taxation. The tables below lists the thirteen taxes to be levied by the Central government and nineteen taxes by States including Maharashtra.

=== Central government of India ===
SL. No.	Taxes as per Union List
82	Income tax: Taxes on income other than agricultural income.
83	Custom Duty: Duties of customs including export duties
84	Excise Duty: Duties of excise on the following goods manufactured or produced in India namely (a)Petroleum crude (b)high speed diesel (c)motor spirit (commonly known as petrol) (d)natural gas (e) aviation turbine fuel and (f)Tobacco and tobacco products
85	Corporation Tax
86	Taxes on capital value of assets, exclusive of agricultural land, of individuals and companies, taxes on capital of companies
87	Estate duty in respect of property other than agricultural land
88	Duties in respect of succession to property other than agricultural land
89	Terminal taxes on goods or passengers, carried by railway, sea or air; taxes on railway fares and freight.
90	Taxes other than stamp duties on transactions in stock exchanges and futures markets
92A	Taxes on sale or purchase of goods other than newspapers, where such sale or purchase takes place in the course of inter-State trade or commerce
92B	Taxes on the consignment of goods in the course of inter-State trade or commerce
97	All residuary types of taxes not listed in any of the three lists of Seventh Schedule of Indian Constitution

=== State governments ===
SL. No.	Taxes as per State List
45	Land revenue, including the assessment and collection of revenue, the maintenance of land records, survey for revenue purposes and records of rights, and alienation of revenues etc.
46	Taxes on agricultural income
47	Duties in respect of succession to agricultural land.
48	Estate Duty in respect of agricultural land
49	Taxes on lands and buildings.
50	Taxes on mineral rights.
51	Duties of excise for following goods manufactured or produced within the State (i) alcoholic liquors for human consumption, and (ii) opium, Indian hemp and other narcotic drugs and narcotics.
53	Electricity Duty:Taxes on the consumption or sale of electricity
54	Taxes on sale of petroleum crude, high speed diesel, motor spirit (commonly known as petrol), Natural gas aviation turbine fuel and alcohol liquor for human consumption but not including sale in the course of inter state or commerce or sale in the source of international trade or commerce such goods.
56	Taxes on goods and passengers carried by roads or on inland waterways.
57	Taxes on vehicles suitable for use on roads.
58	Taxes on animals and boats.
59	Tolls.
60	Taxes on profession, trades, callings and employments.
61	Capitation taxes.
62	Taxes on entertainment and amusements to be extent levied and collected by a panchayat or Municipality or a regional council or a district council.
63	Stamp duty

=== Goods and Services Tax ===
The Goods and Services Tax came into effect from 1 July 2017 through the implementation of the One Hundred and First Amendment of the Constitution of India by the Indian government. The GST replaced existing multiple taxes levied by the central and state governments. It is an indirect tax (or consumption tax) used on the supply of goods and services. It is a comprehensive, multistage, destination-based tax: comprehensive because it has subsumed almost all the indirect taxes except a few state taxes. Multi-staged as it is, the GST is imposed at every step in the production process, but is meant to be refunded to all parties in the various stages of production other than the final consumer and as a destination-based tax, it is collected from point of consumption and not point of origin like previous taxes.

== Labour force ==
As of 2015, 52.7% of the workers in the state were in the agriculture sector. 25.4% are of these were cultivators (land owners), while 27.3% were agricultural labourers. The state has a significant interstate and intrastate migrant worker population. Out of state workers primarily come from states of Uttar Pradesh, Bihar, Karnataka, and Rajasthan. Migrant workers primarily find employment in the more developed regions of the state such Mumbai, Pune and Nashik metropolitan areas of western Maharashtra as well as to a lesser extent in the Aurangabad and Nagpur regions. Intrastate migrants also find opportunities in the regions mentioned above.

=== Income and poverty ===
The income of the population of maharashtra is steadfast and growing

== Economy of regions ==
Divisions of Maharashtra

Maharashtra is divided into six divisions for administrative purposes viz. Amravati, Nagpur, Aurangabad, Konkan, Nashik, and Pune. These divisions broadly coincide with Vidarbha (Amravati & Nagpur divisions), Marathwada (Aurangabad), Western Maharashtra (Pune and Nashik divisions), Konkan (Excluding Mumbai Metropolitan region), and Mumbai Metropolitan Region. Mumbai metropolitan region and Western Maharashtra are economically the most developed regions and account for around 50% of the state's GDP. The Marathwada region is the least developed region mainly because it previously belonged to then feudal princely state of Hyderabad.

=== Mumbai Metropolitan area ===
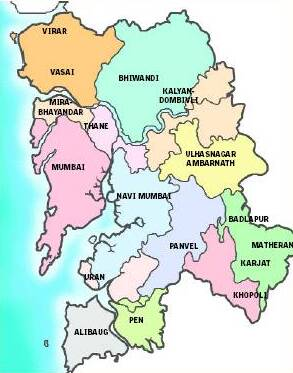
Map of Mumbai metropolitan region

Mumbai is India's largest city (by population) and is the financial and commercial capital of India as it generates 6.16% of the total GDP. It serves as an economic hub of India, contributing 10% of factory employment, 25% of industrial output, 33% of income tax collections, 60% of customs duty collections, 20% of central excise tax collections, 40% of India's foreign trade and ₹4,000 crore (US$420 million) in corporate taxes. Along with the rest of India, Mumbai has witnessed an economic boom since the liberalisation of 1991, the finance boom in the mid-nineties and the IT, export, services and outsourcing boom in the 2000s. Although Mumbai had prominently figured as the hub of economic activity of India in the 1990s, the Mumbai Metropolitan Region is presently witnessing a reduction in its contribution to India's GDP.

As of 2015, Mumbai's metro area GDP (PPP) was estimated at $368 billion. Many of India's numerous conglomerates (including Larsen & Toubro, State Bank of India (SBI), Life Insurance Corporation of India (LIC), Tata Group, Godrej and Reliance), and five of the Fortune Global 500 companies are based in Mumbai. This is facilitated by the presence of the Reserve Bank of India (RBI), the Bombay Stock Exchange (BSE), the National Stock Exchange of India (NSE), and financial sector regulators such as the Securities and Exchange Board of India (SEBI).

Until the 1970s, Mumbai owed its prosperity largely to textile mills and the seaport, but the local economy has since then diversified to include finance, engineering, diamond-polishing, healthcare and information technology. The key sectors contributing to the city's economy are: finance, gems & jewellery, leather processing, IT and ITES, textiles, and entertainment. Nariman Point and Bandra Kurla Complex (BKC) are Mumbai's major financial centres. Despite competition from Bangalore, Hyderabad and Pune, Mumbai has carved a niche for itself in the information technology industry. The Santacruz Electronic Export Processing Zone (SEEPZ) and the International Infotech Park (Navi Mumbai) offer excellent facilities to IT companies.

State and central government employees make up a large percentage of the city's workforce. Mumbai also has a large unskilled and semi-skilled self-employed population, who primarily earn their livelihood in unorganized labour sector as hawkers, taxi drivers, mechanics etc. The port and shipping industry is well established, with Mumbai Port being one of the oldest and most significant ports in India. Dharavi, in central Mumbai, has an increasingly large recycling industry, processing recyclable waste from other parts of the city; the district has an estimated 15,000 single-room factories.

Mumbai has been ranked sixth among top ten global cities on the billionaire count with 28 and 46,000 millionaires, with total wealth around $820 billion 48th on the Worldwide Centres of Commerce Index 2008, seventh in the list of "Top Ten Cities for Billionaires" by Forbes magazine (April 2008), and first in terms of those billionaires' average wealth. As of 2008, the Globalization and World Cities Study Group (GaWC) has ranked Mumbai as an "Alpha world city", third in its categories of Global cities. Mumbai is the third most expensive office market in the world, and was ranked among the fastest cities in the country for business startup in 2009.

=== Pune Division ===
==== Pune metropolitan region ====
As one of the largest cities of India and major centre of learning with several colleges and universities, Pune has emerged as a prominent location for IT and manufacturing. Pune has the eighth largest metropolitan economy and the sixth highest per capita income in the country.

Automotive companies such as Bajaj Auto, Tata Motors, Mahindra & Mahindra, Mercedes-Benz, Force Motors (Firodia-Group), Kinetic Motors, General Motors, Land Rover, Jaguar, Renault, Volkswagen, and Fiat have set up greenfield facilities near Pune, leading The Independent to cite Pune as India's "Motor City".

The Kirloskar Group, was the first to bring industry to Pune by setting up Kirloskar Oil Engines Ltd. in 1945 at Kirkee in Pune. The Group was originally set up in Kirloskarwadi. Kirloskar Brothers Limited (One of India's largest manufacturer and exporter of pumps and the largest infrastructure pumping project contractor in Asia), Kirloskar Oil Engines (India's largest diesel engine company), Kirloskar Pneumatics Co. Ltd., and other Kirloskar companies are based in Pune.

The Hinjawadi IT Park (officially called the Rajeev Gandhi IT Park) is a project started by MIDC to house the IT sector in Pune. When completed, the Hinjawadi IT Park is expected to encompass an area of about 2,800 acres (11 km^{2}). The estimated investment in the project is ₹600 billion (US$6.2 billion). To facilitate economic growth, the government made liberal incentives in its IT and ITES Policy, 2003 and leased properties on MIDC land. The IT sector employs more than 4 lakh people. Software giant Microsoft intends to set up a ₹7 billion (US$73 million) project in Hinjawadi.

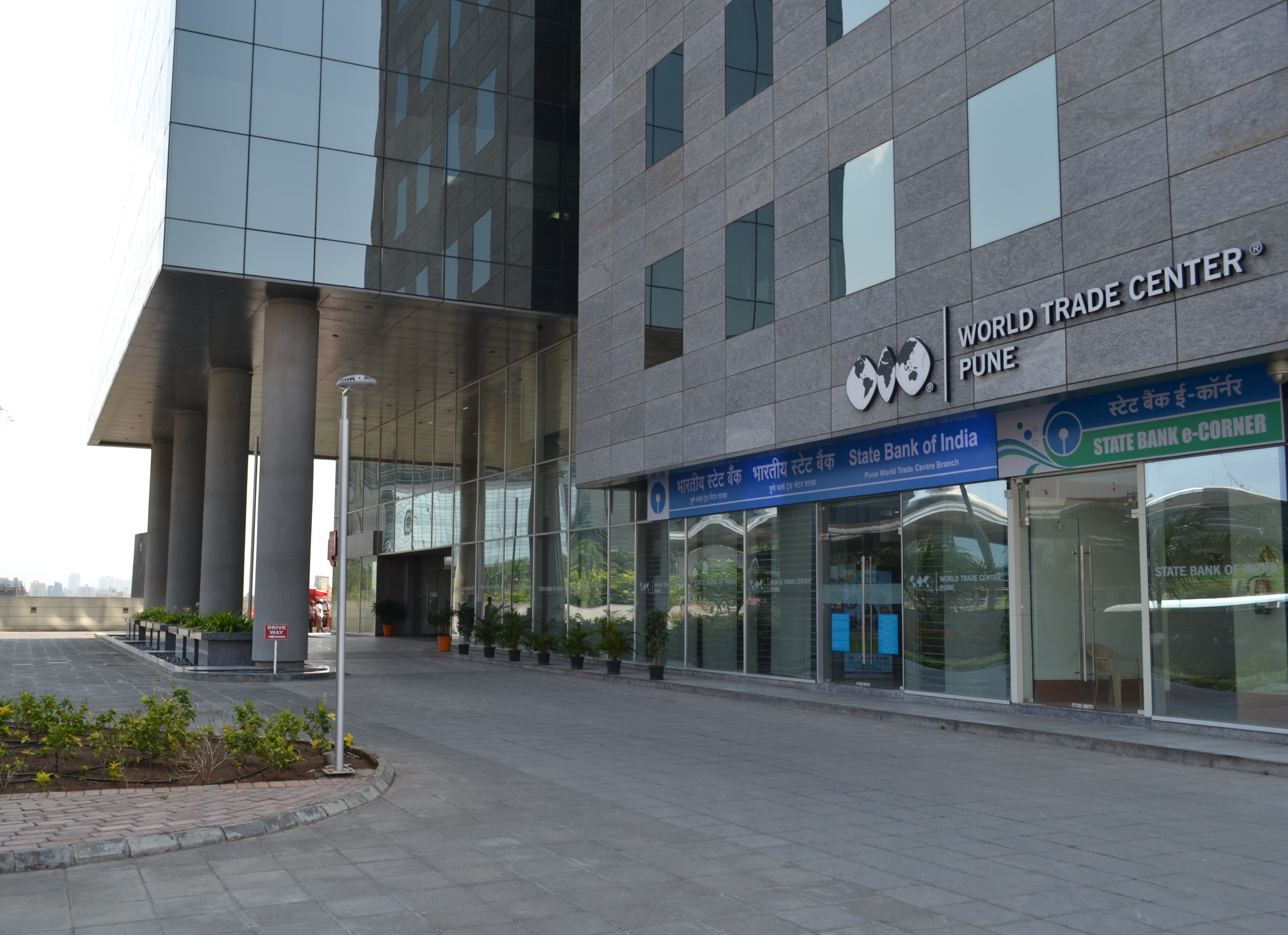
World Trade Centre in Pune, Maharashtra

Pune Food Cluster development project is an initiative funded by the World Bank. It is being implemented with the help of SIDBI, Cluster Craft to facilitate the development of the fruit and vegetable processing industries in and around Pune.

Pune has also emerged as a new startup hub in India with tech startups like Pubmatic, Firstcry.com, Storypick.com, TripHobo, TastyKhana.com (acquired by Foodpanda), Swipe setting up base in Pune. NASSCOM in association with MIDC have started a co-working space for city based startups under its '10,000 startup' initiative at Kharadi MIDC. It will incubate startup such as Kandawale from OhMyDealer in first batch.

The Meetings, Incentives, Conferencing, Exhibitions trade is expected to get a boost once the Pune International Exhibition and Convention Centre (PIECC) completes in 2017. The 97-hectare PIECC will boast a seating capacity of 20,000 with a floor area of 13,000 m^{2} (139,931 sq ft). It will have seven exhibition centres, a convention centre, a golf course, a five-star hotel, a business complex, shopping malls, and residences. The US$115 million project is developed by the Pimpri-Chinchwad New Town Development Authority. Nowadays a growing number of automotive dealerships are springing up all over the city. They include luxury car makers like Jaguar Land Rover, Mercedes-Benz, BMW, Audi, and motorcycle manufacturers like Kawasaki, KTM, Benelli, Ducati, BMW and Harley Davidson.

=== Vidarbha ===
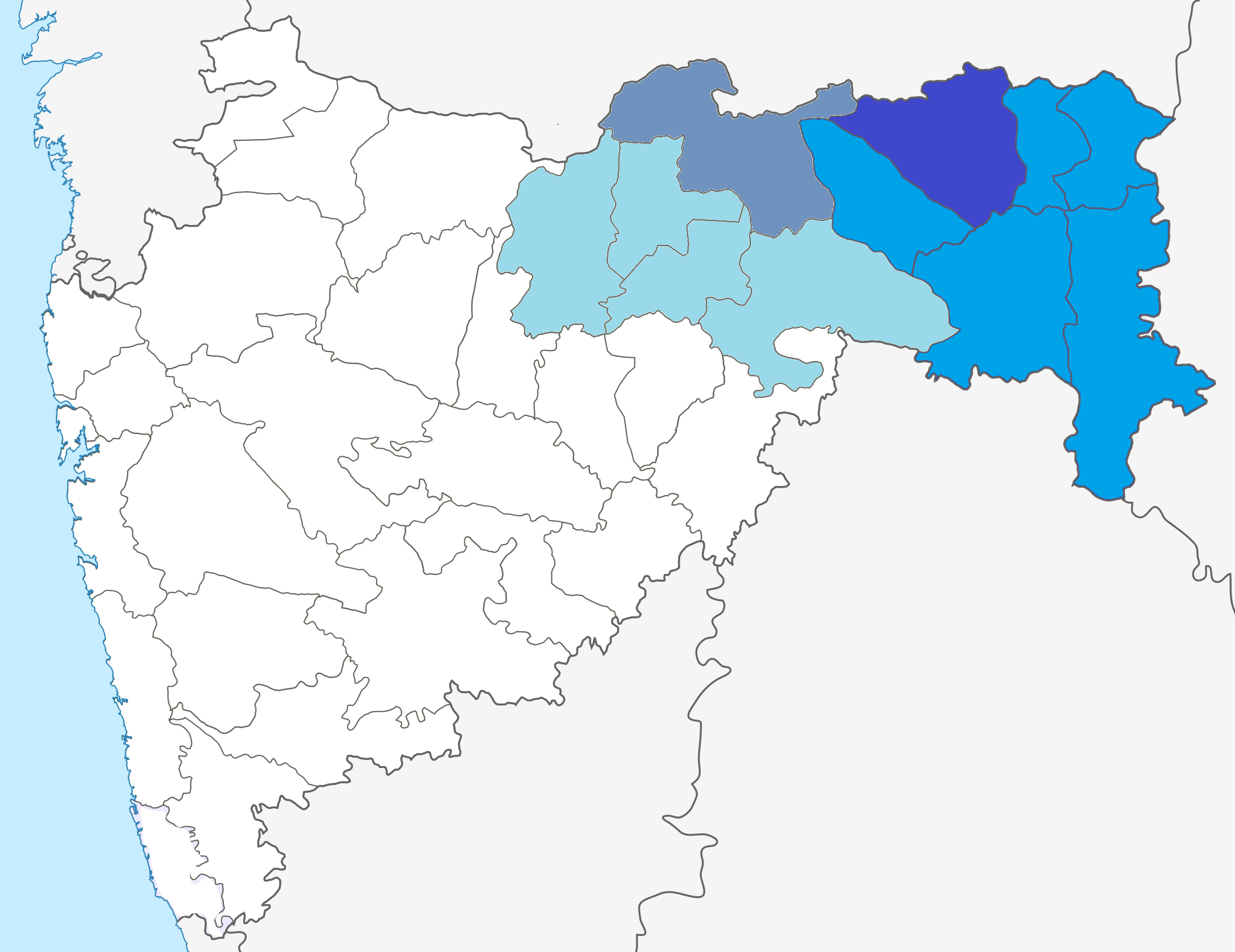
Vidarbha region

Vidarbha's economy is primarily agricultural, with the addition of forest and mineral wealth. An international cargo hub project, the Multi-modal International Cargo Hub and Airport at Nagpur, (MIHAN), has been developed. MIHAN will be used for handling heavy cargo coming from South-East Asia and Middle-East Asia. The project will also include a ₹100 billion (US$1.0 billion) Special Economic Zone (SEZ) for information-technology companies. This will be India's biggest development project.

Gondia, Yavatmal, Chandrapur, Akola, Amravati and Nagpur are the major cities of the region. Nagpur is a central hub for business and healthcare. Nagpur is the winter capital of Maharashtra, a sprawling metropolis and the third largest city of the state after Mumbai and Pune. Nagpur is also called Orange city for the huge orange producing area surrounding the city. It also has the largest timber market of Asia. Amravati is known for film distributors and cloth markets. Chandrapur has a thermal power station which is one of the biggest in India and some other heavy industries such as paper (BILT Ballarpur), steel (MEL from Steel Authority of India, etc.), cement (UltraTech Cement, Ambuja Cements, ACC Limited, Manikgarh Cement, Murli Cement) industries and numerous coal mines.

=== Nashik Division (Nashik and Northern Maharashtra) ===
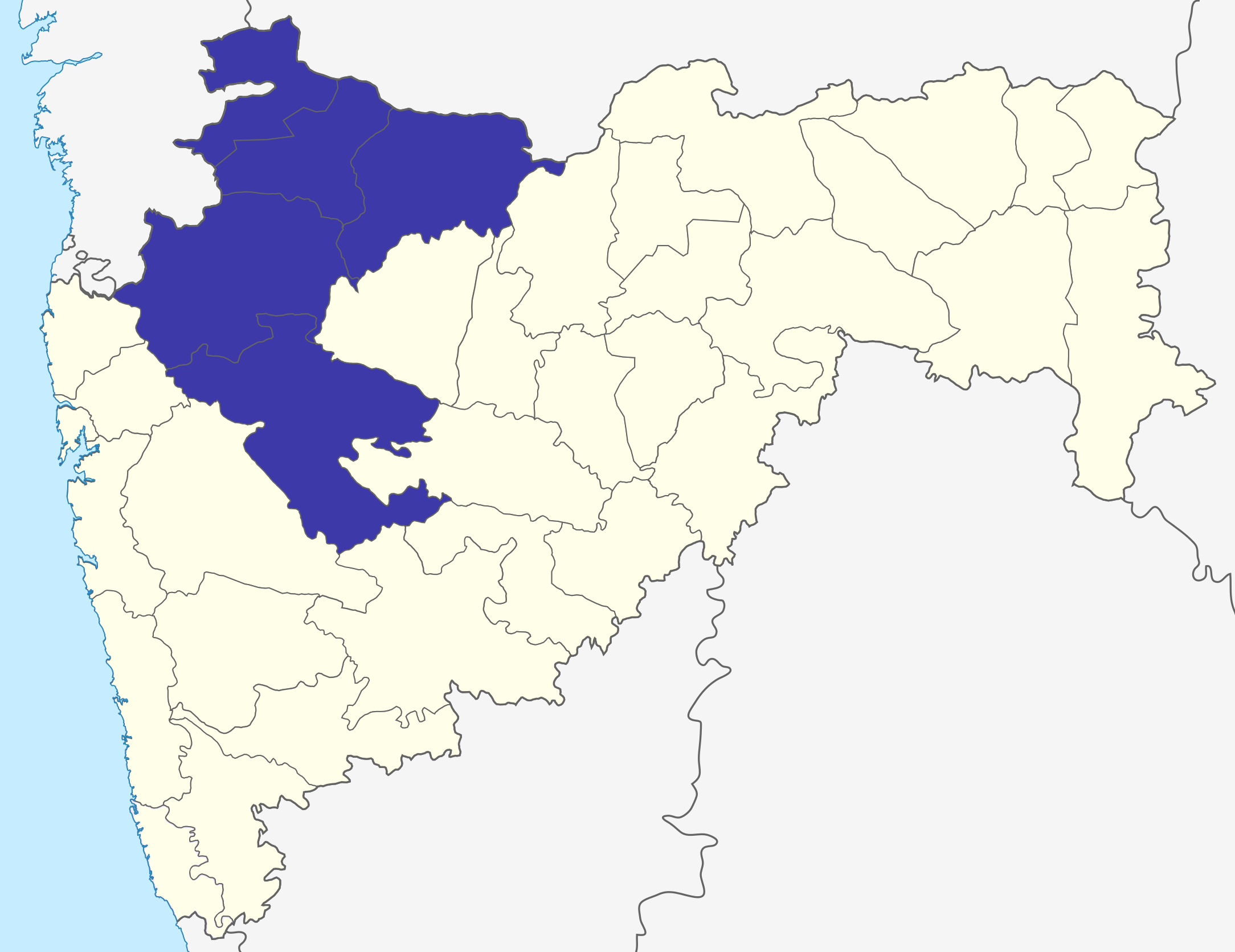
Map of Nashik Division which includes districts of Ahmadnagar, Nashik, Jalgaon, Nandurbar and Dhule

Nashik division includes districts of Ahmadnagar, Nashik, Jalgaon, Nandurbar and Dhule in North Western Maharashtra. Apart from Nashik district, all the other districts in the division have been designated the 250 most backward districts in India and have received additional funding from the Indian government for development purposes.

Nashik is the largest city in this region. Nashik division cities have been included in Smart city project by Central Government of India as an important node in the US$90 billion Delhi Mumbai Industrial Corridor Project. Economy of Nashik district is mainly driven by manufacturing, pharmaceuticals, and engineering industry. Cash crops agriculture is important in the areas surrounding the city. There are main five industrial zones under Maharashtra Industrial Development Corporation (MIDC) in Nashik district. A diverse range of privately owned manufacturing giants have their plants and units in the city and surrounding areas. Nashik area is also a hub for many government run printing, defence research, and manufacturing facilities. This includes aircraft and artillery.

Apart from manufacturing, Nashik is also emerging as an investment destination for Information Technology companies.

Nashik has a textile industry. National Bank for Agriculture and Rural Development has selected Yeola Block for development of Paithani Cluster.

In recent decades, Nasik region has emerged as Wine Capital of India with 45 local wineries and vineyards. Many vineyards have achieved international recognition as Nashik Valley wines. The wines and the grapes grown in the area have received geographical indications. These vineyards are also developing the tourism related to wine testing and vineyards. Nashik is also known as a main exporter of pomegranates, and grapes and onions. Ahmadnagar district has one of the largest concentration of Cooperative Sugar mills in Maharashtra. Jalgaon district is known for its Bananas and Brinjal. Both crops have received Geographical indication.

=== Marathwada ===
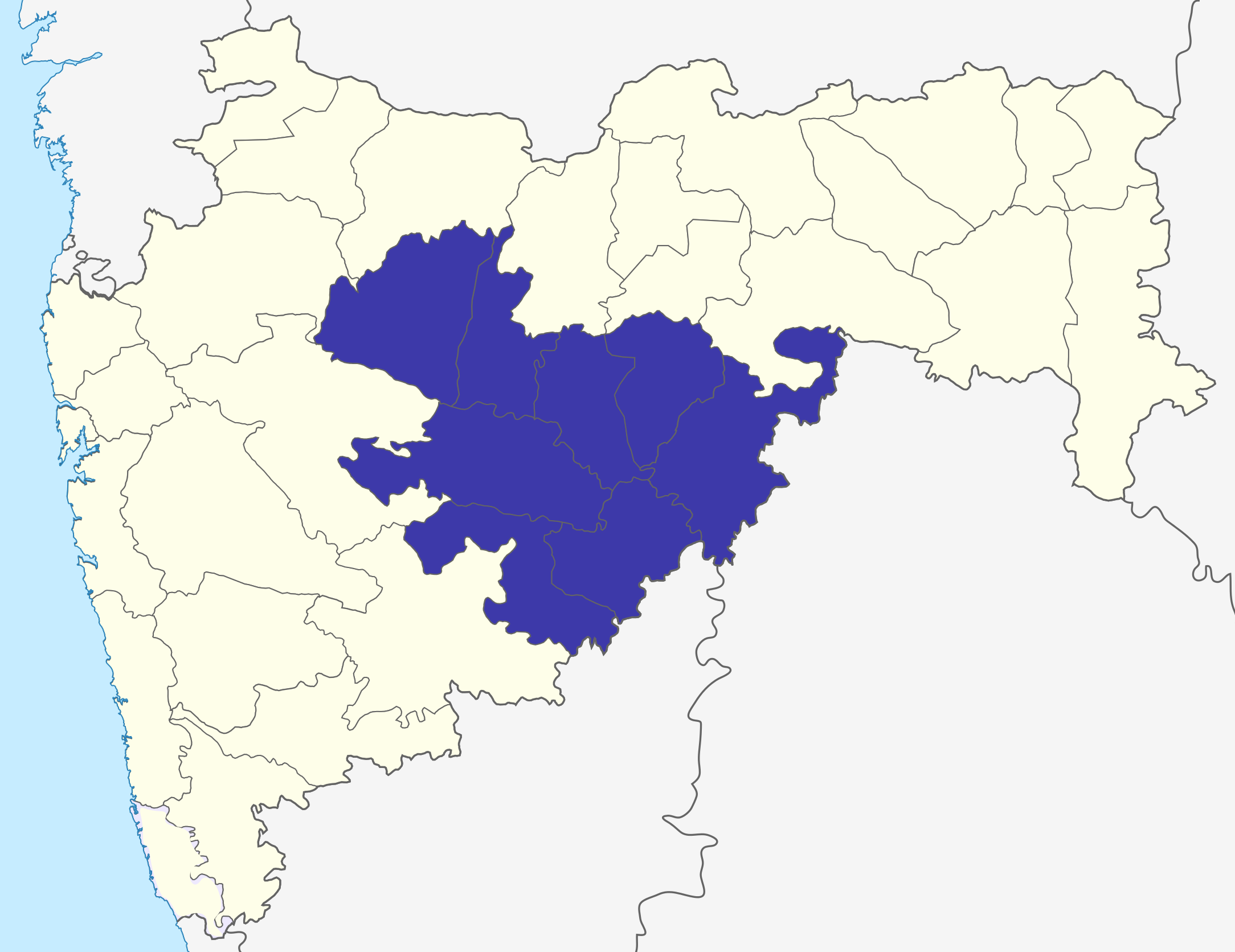
map of Marathwada

The word "Marathwada" has been used since the times of the Nizams. The region coincides with the Aurangabad Division of Maharashtra. Since the establishment of the state of Maharashtra in 1960 and later that of MIDC, new industrial development has taken place in Marathwada region however it is concentrated mainly around the district of Aurangabad. The remaining six districts of the region have not benefited to any great extent in the process of industrialization. The main reason for such uneven development was the better infrastructure facilities available in Aurangabad city in relation to other districts and places in the region.

== See also ==
- Maharashtra Industrial Development Corporation
- Make in India

== Bibliography ==
- Sharma, Pradeep (2007). Human Geography: Energy Resources. New Delhi: Discovery Publishing House. ISBN 978-8183562867.
- "India's major ports see 6.7 percent growth in container volumes". JOC.com. 7 April 2015. Archived from the original on 7 January 2019.
- Swaminathan, R.; Goyal, Jaya (2006). Mumbai vision 2015: agenda for urban renewal. Macmillan India in association with Observer Research Foundation.
- Kelsey, Jane (2008). Serving Whose Interests?: The Political Economy of Trade in Services Agreements. Taylor & Francis. ISBN 978-0-415-44821-5.
