= List of airports in Maharashtra =

This includes a list of airports in Maharashtra, India, including commercially used airfields, former airfields, flying schools and military bases. This list contains the following information:

1. City served – The city generally associated with the airport is not always the actual location since some airports are located in smaller towns outside the city they serve.
2. ICAO – The location indicator assigned by the International Civil Aviation Organization (ICAO).
3. IATA – The airport code assigned by the International Air Transport Association (IATA).
4. Operator – Operator of the airport. Airports Authority of India, Maharashtra Airport Development Company, Adani Enterprises, Maharashtra Industrial Development Corporation, Hindustan Aeronautics Limited and RADL operate airports in Maharashtra.
5. Role – Role of the airport as given by the table below. An airport may play more than one role.

Role of Airport
Role	Description
International	Handles International flights.
Customs	Airports with customs checking and clearance facilities handling international flights but not elevated to international airport status
Domestic	Handles domestic flights only
Civil enclave	Civil Enclaves at a military airfield
General Aviation	No scheduled commercial flights
Military	Used for defence purposes
Flying School	Used primarily to train pilots
Private	Privately owned airfields/airstrips
Future	Project proposed or under construction
Closed	No longer in operation

Commercial service	Airport has commercial service
Commercial service	Airport has no commercial service

- There are 10 civilian airports operational:

7 - regional, domestic.

3 - regional, domestic, international.

- Chhatrapati Shivaji Maharaj International Airport in Mumbai is the state's busiest and country's second busiest airport, followed by Pune Airport

== List ==
List of airports
City Served	Airport	ICAO	IATA	Operator	Role
Aamby Valley City	Aamby Valley Airport	VAAV	IN-0033	—	Private
Akola	Akola Airport	VAAK	AKD	AAI	General Aviation
Amravati	Amravati Airport	VAAM	AVR	MADC	Domestic
Aurangabad	Aurangabad Airport	VAAU	IXU	AAI	Domestic
Baramati	Baramati Airport	—	IN-0024	RADL	Flying School
Chandrapur	Chandrapur Airport	VA1B	—	MADC	General Aviation
Dhule	Dhule Airport	VA53	—	MADC	Flying School
Gondia	Gondia Airport	VAGD	GDB	AAI	Domestic + Flying School
Jalgaon	Jalgaon Airport	VAJL	JLG	AAI	Domestic
Kalyan	Kalyan Airstrip	—	—	Military	Closed
Karad	Karad Airport	VA1M	—	MADC	Flying School
Kolhapur	Kolhapur Airport	VAKP	KLH	AAI	Domestic
Latur	Latur Airport	VALT	LTU	RADL	General Aviation
Mumbai	Chhatrapati Shivaji Maharaj International Airport	VABB	BOM	Adani Group	International
Mumbai	Juhu Aerodrome	VAJJ	—	AAI	General Aviation
Nagpur	Dr. Babasaheb Ambedkar International Airport	VANP	NAG	GMR & MADC	International
Nanded	Nanded Airport	VAND	NDC	RADL	Domestic
Nashik	Nashik Airport	VAOZ	ISK	HAL	International
Nashik	Gandhinagar Airport	VANR	—	Indian Army	Military
Nashik	Vijaynagar Airport	IN-0039	—	Indian Army	Military
Navi Mumbai	Navi Mumbai International Airport	VANM	NMI	Adani Group	International
Osmanabad	Osmanabad Airport	—	OMN	RADL	General Aviation
Phaltan	Phaltan Airfield	—	—	MADC	Closed
Pune	Hadapsar Gliding Centre	—	—	DGCA	Flying School
Pune	Pune International Airport	VAPO	PNQ	Indian Air Force	International
Pune	New Pune Airport (Under Planning stage)	—	—	MADC	Future
Pune	Khadakwasla Airport	VAKX	—	NDA	Military
Ratnagiri	Ratnagiri Airport	VARG	RTC	Coast Guard	Military
Shirdi	Shirdi Airport	VASD	SAG	MADC	International
Shirpur	Shirpur Airstrip	—	IN-0062	—	Private
Sindhudurg	Sindhudurg Airport	—	SDW	IRB Infrastructure	Domestic
Solapur	Solapur Airport	VASL	SSL	AAI	Domestic
Yavatmal	Sant Gadge Baba Yavatmal Airport	VA78	YTL	RADL	General Aviation
