= Aamby Valley Airport =

Airport in Maharashtra, India

- IATA: none; ICAO: VAAV

Summary
- Airport type: Public
- Owner/Operator: Airport Authority of India
- Serves: Aamby Valley City
- Location: Aamby Valley, Lonavala, Maharashtra, India
- Opened: 2004
- Time zone: Indian Standard Time (+5:30)
- Coordinates: 18°36′33.5″N 073°22′39.9″E

Map

Runways
Direction	Length		Surface
Direction	ft	m	Surface
14/32	3,937	1,200

Aamby Valley Airport (ICAO: VAAV) is a small airport located in the state of Maharashtra, India. The airport is only used by private aircraft and does not have scheduled flights. In 2019 the airport was included in the UDAN regional connectivity scheme.
