= Dhakti Jui =

Village in Maharashtra

Dhakti Jui is a village in Uran Taluka, Raigad District in the Indian state of Maharashtra. It is located near Navi Mumbai. It is known for the special type of fishes known locally as Jitada.

== Gallery ==
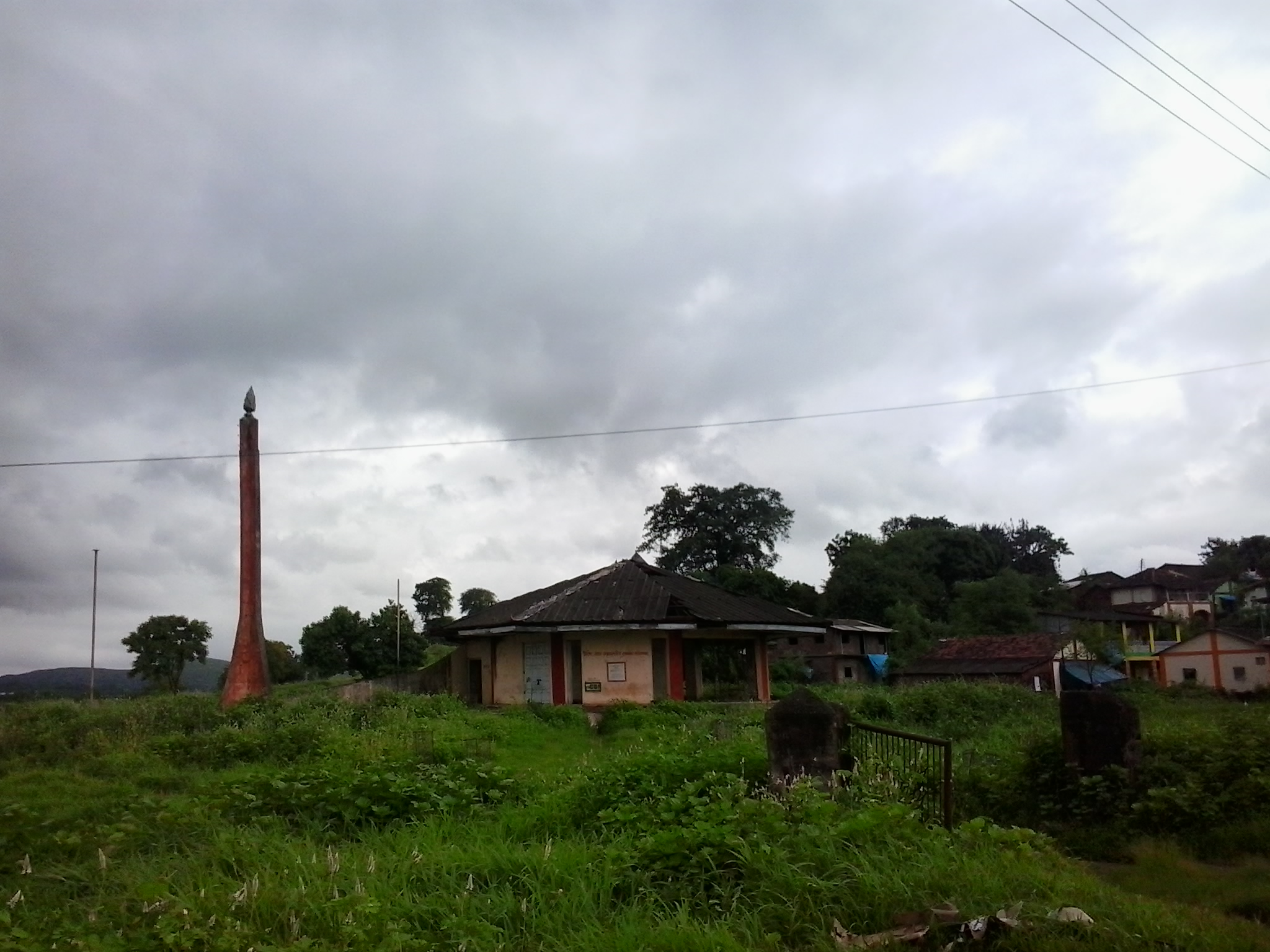
Dhakti Jui's Smarak

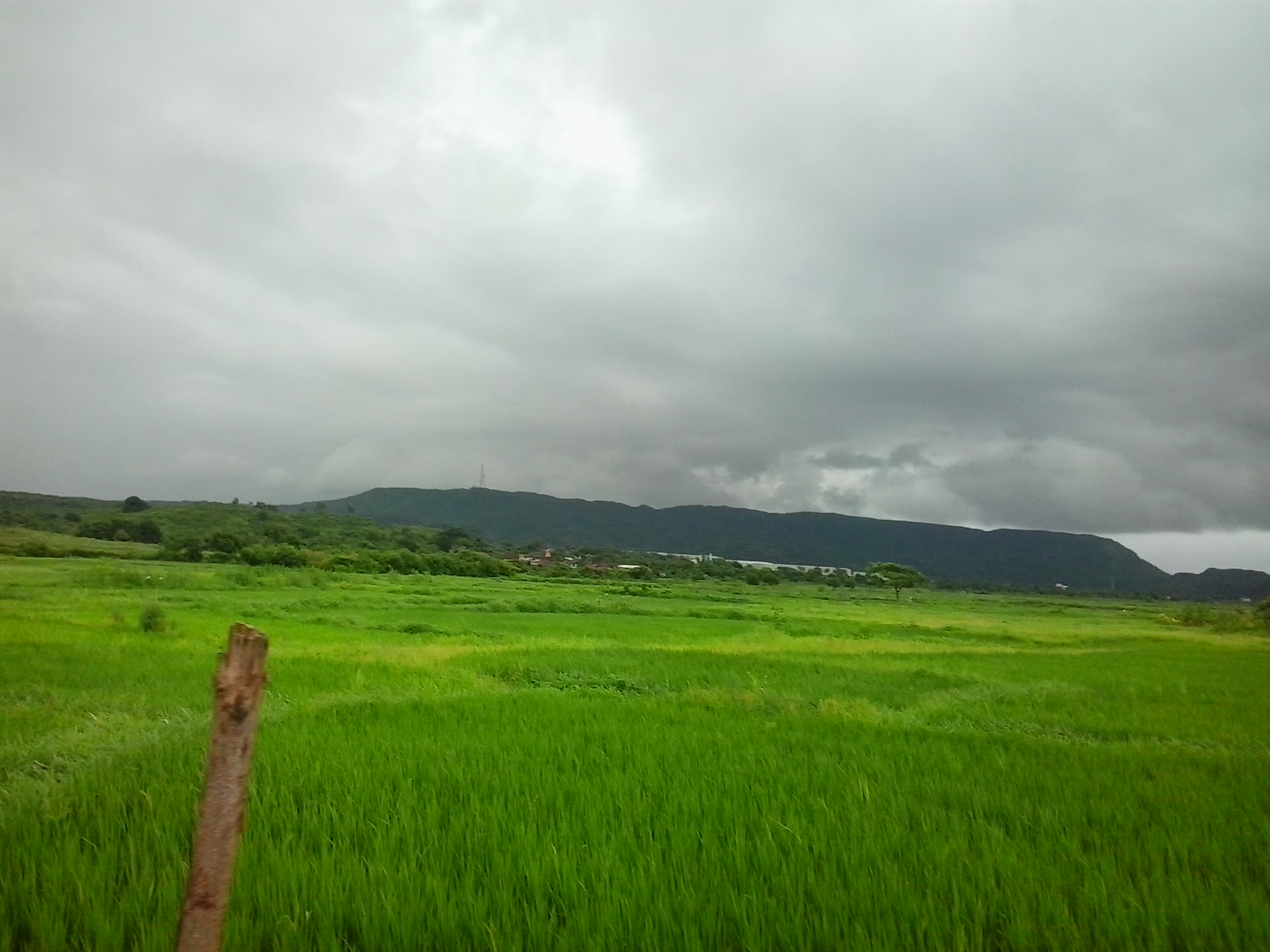
Paddy fields in Dhakti Jui

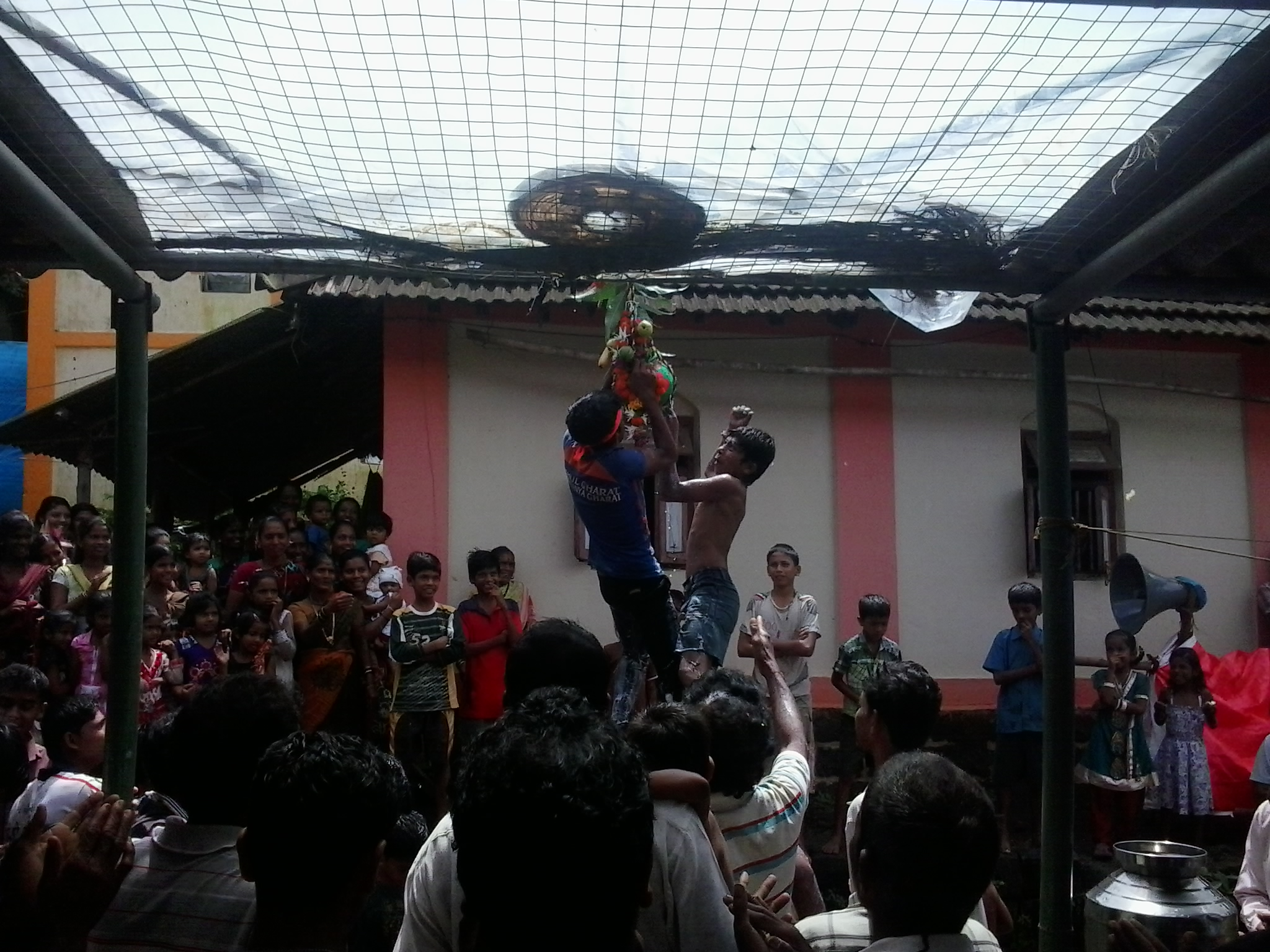
Govinda Festival Celebration

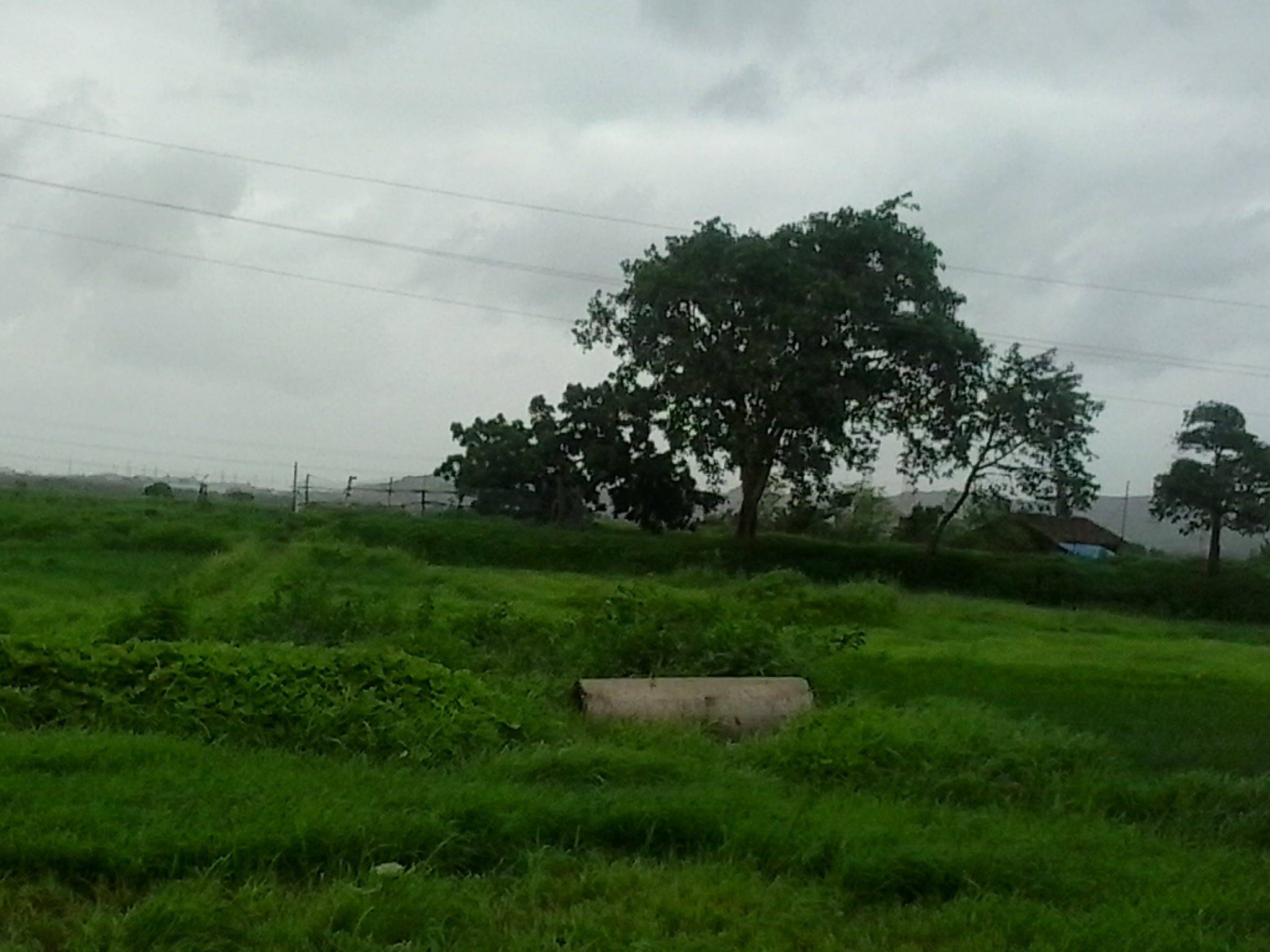
Scenery of Dhakti Jui
