= Amravati Airport =

Airport in Amravati, Maharashtra, India

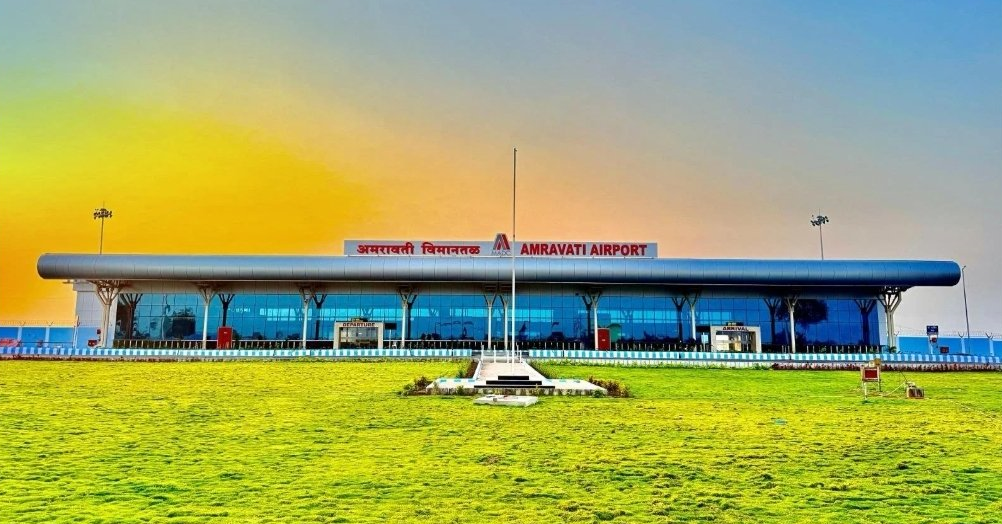
- Amravati Airport Terminal Building
- IATA: AVR; ICAO: VAAM

Summary
- Airport type: Public
- Owner: Government of Maharashtra
- Operator: Maharashtra Airport Development Company
- Serves: Amravati
- Location: Belora, Maharashtra, India
- Elevation AMSL: 1,137 ft (347 m)
- Coordinates: 20°48′48″N 077°43′04″E

Map
- Location within Maharashtra Location within India

Runways
Direction	Length		Surface
Direction	ft	m	Surface
08/26	6,070	1,850	Asphalt

Statistics (April 2025 – March 2026)
- Passengers: 13,663 (▲ -%)
- Aircraft movements: 387 (▲ -%)
- Cargo tonnage: —
- Source: AAI

Amravati Airport (IATA: AVR, ICAO: VAAM) is an airport in Amravati, Maharashtra. It is located in Belora, Amravati, 15 km (9.3 mi) south of Amravati city and Amravati railway station. It is the third commercial airport under the Maharashtra Airport Development Company. The airport started regular passenger flights on April 16, 2025, with Chief Minister Devendra Fadnavis inaugurating it the same day. The first flight out of the airport was operated by Alliance Air.

The airport covers an area of 389 hectares and features a runway measuring 1850 meters in length and 45 meters in width, designated as 08/26. It includes a taxiway measuring 163 meters by 18 meters and an apron with dimensions of 100 meters by 110 meters. The terminal building spans 2600 square meters, and the air traffic control (ATC) tower stands at a height of 26 meters. Currently, work on the installation of a night landing facility is ongoing.

== History ==
The airstrip, constructed by the Public Works Department in 1992, was taken over by the Maharashtra Industrial Development Corporation (MIDC) in August 1997 and later transferred to the Maharashtra Airport Development Company (MADC). In February 2014, the Maharashtra government decided to lease the airport to the Airports Authority of India (AAI) for 60 years for a monthly rent of Rs 100,000. The AAI will develop the airport over three years. The runway will be extended to 2,500 metres suitable for landing Airbus A-320 aircraft.

The land acquisition process began in the early 2010s and was completed by 2013. However, due to a lack of funds, development work could not begin until 2019. In 2019, the foundation stone was laid for the development of the airport. The planned work involved extending the runway to 1,850 meters in the first phase, constructing an apron of 110 by 120 meters, an isolation bay, a taxiway, and a new terminal building. As of August 2023, the runway extension, apron, and taxiway have been completed, and work on the terminal building is in progress. The development of the night landing facility is still pending due to a lack of approvals and funds from the government.

In February 2011, the Nagpur Flying Club applied to the Director General of Civil Aviation for permission to relocate its flying operations to Amravati Airport. However, after a delay of 13 years, it was reported by, The Times of India in May 2024 that the Maharashtra Airport Development Company had approved the club's shift to Morwa Airport in Chandrapur, instead of Amravati.

== Flying Training Organization ==
Air India, operated by the Tata Group, was awarded a tender by the MADC to establish and manage what is set to become Indian subcontinent's largest Flying Training Organization (FTO) at Amravati Airport. The FTO, licensed by the Directorate General of Civil Aviation for a 30-year period, was expected to become operational by mid-2025. The project, involving an investment of over ₹200 crore (US$21 million), is anticipated to train 180 commercial pilots annually. This marks the first FTO to be established by an Indian airline. The development is part of ongoing infrastructure upgrades at Amravati Airport in collaboration with MADC.

In December 2024, Air India placed an order for 31 single-engine from Piper Aircraft and 3 twin-engine aircraft from Diamond Aircraft Industries for training purposes. The aircraft, equippied with Jet A1 engines, deliveries would start form 2025.

On 12 December 2025, the first two Diamond DA42 NG were flown from Vienna to Amaravati. So far, 13 trainers from Piper Aircraft were shipped from Florida. The DA42 aircraft stopped at six countries to reach India. They landed at GIFT City, Ahmedabad on 10 December.

== Airlines and destinations ==
Airlines	Destinations
Alliance Air	Mumbai

== See also ==
- Amravati
- Amravati railway station
- Shirdi Airport
- Nagpur Airport
- Gondia Airport
- Jalgaon Airport
- Pune Airport
- Mumbai Airport
