= Jalgaon Airport =

Airport in Maharashtra, India

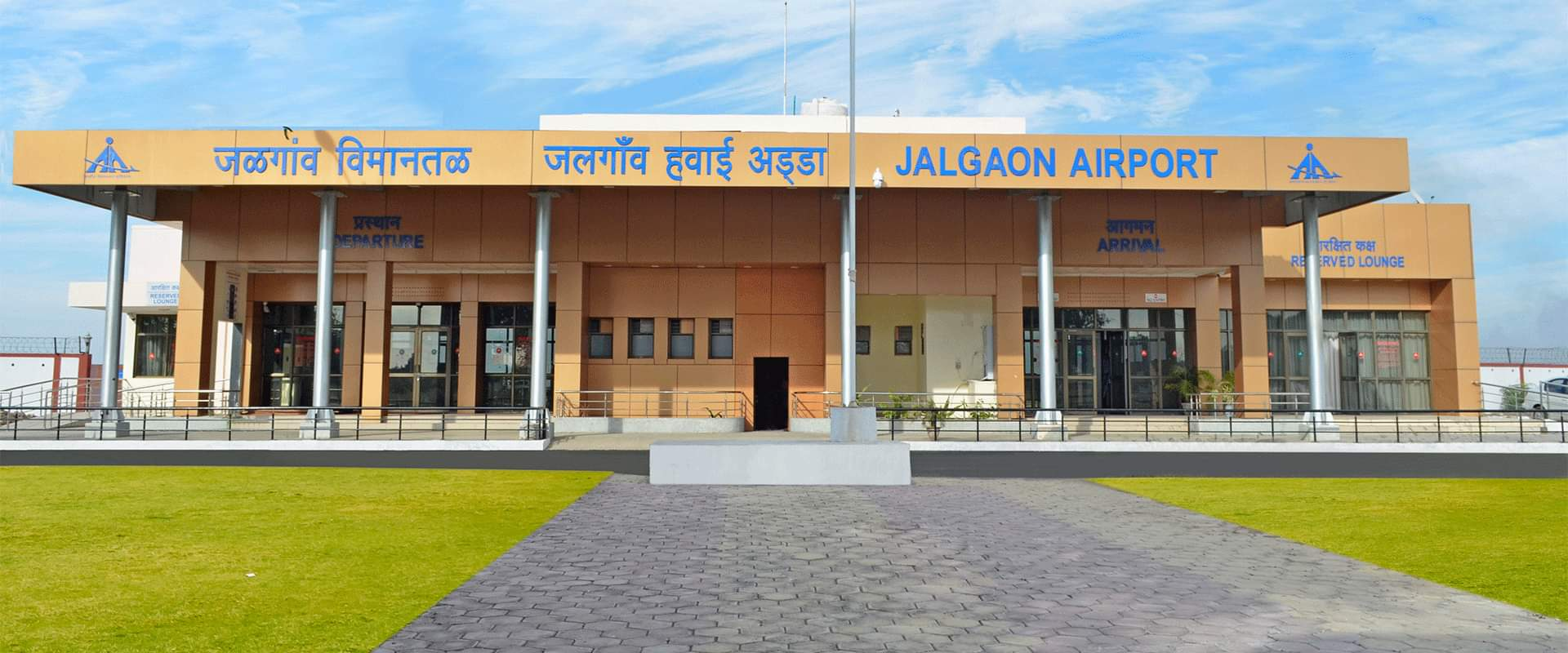
- IATA: JLG; ICAO: VAJL

Summary
- Airport type: Public
- Owner: Airports Authority of India
- Operator: Airports Authority of India
- Serves: Jalgaon
- Location: Kusumbe, Jalgaon, Maharashtra, India
- Built: 1973; 53 years ago
- Elevation AMSL: 840 ft (260 m)
- Coordinates: 20°57′43″N 075°37′36″E
- Website: Jalgaon Airport

Map
- Location within Maharashtra Location within India

Runways
Direction	Length		Surface
Direction	ft	m	Surface
09/27	5,574	1,700	Asphalt

Statistics (April 2025 - March 2026)
- Passengers: 1,43,943 (▲55.7%)
- Aircraft movements: 2,826 (▲30.7%)
- Cargo tonnage: 0 ( 0%)
- Source: AAI

Jalgaon Airport (IATA: JLG, ICAO: VAJL) is a domestic airport serving the city of Jalgaon in Maharashtra, India. It is located in Kusumbe, off National Highway 753F (NH-753F), 9 km (5.6 mi) southeast of the city centre, and 47 km (29 mi) away from the Ajanta Caves, for which it is its closest airport.

The airport has a flight training institute run by Skynex Aviation. After resumption of operations in April 2024 with Fly91 and Alliance Air from June 2024, the airport became one of the fastest growing airports in Maharashtra, with direct connectivity to the major cities of Mumbai, Pune, Hyderabad, Goa and Ahmedabad. As of June 2024, it is the fifth-busiest airport in the state by private and commercial aircraft movements.

== History ==
The airport was built in 1973 by the Public Works Department. The Jalgaon Municipal Council took over its operations from April 1997 and handed it over to the Maharashtra Airport Development Company (MADC) in April 2007. The Government of Maharashtra signed a Memorandum of Understanding (MoU) with the Airports Authority of India (AAI) to upgrade the airport in July 2009. The then President of India, Pratibha Patil, laid the foundation stone for the development and expansion of the airport in June 2010. The AAI completed the first phase of work worth ₹61 crore (equivalent to ₹125 crore or US$13 million in 2026) in February 2012, including a new apron and a taxiway. The revamped airport was inaugurated on 23 March 2012 by President Pratibha Patil.

In 2016, the Government of Maharashra signed up for the Ministry of Civil Aviation's regional connectivity scheme (RCS) called UDAN, that would fast-track the development of ten regional airports in the state, including Jalgaon. Under UDAN, Air Deccan won the contract to start flights from Jalgaon to Mumbai. The airline flew the first-ever scheduled commercial flight from the airport to Mumbai on 23 December 2017. However, the airline stopped the flights in October 2018, citing technical issues. The Government cancelled the contract and the route was allotted to TruJet, and started operating from Jalgaon to Ahmedabad and Mumbai from 1 September 2019. However, the airline stopped all operations in 2020 due to the COVID-19 pandemic, and never restarted owing to the airline's bankruptcy in February 2022. Since then, the airport handled only private, charter and government flights. As the airport continues to be a part of the UDAN Scheme, in July 2023, a regional airline startup named Fly91 was allocated by the Ministry of Civil Aviation to start routes to eight cities in India, including Jalgaon. Hence, after beginning operations from its base at Manohar International Airport in Goa in March 2024, Fly91 restarted commercial operations in the airport, by starting new flights to Goa and Hyderabad from 18 April 2024.

== Structure ==
The airport is spread over an area of 630 acres and has one runway oriented 09/27, measuring 1,700 m (5,600 ft) in length. Its new apron measuring 68 metres by 67 metres provides parking space for two ATR-72 aircraft at a time. The runway has basic approach and runway edge lighting. Navigational and landing aids at the airport includes a DVOR/DME and a PAPI equipped on both sides of the runway. The terminal building covers an area of 700 m^{2} (7,500 sq ft) and can accommodate 120 passengers during peak hours.

== Facilities ==
The airport has all basic facilities as present in regional airports. The terminal has a booking counter area, few retail shops, washrooms, a baggage handling area, a waiting area, medical and emergency facilities, facilities for physically challenged passengers, and outside it there is a fire station, an Air Traffic Control (ATC) tower, a technical block, a flight training centre and ground vehicles connecting the terminal to the apron, as the terminal does not have any aerobridges at present.

== Airlines and destinations ==
Airlines	Destinations
Alliance Air	Ahmedabad, Mumbai
Fly91	Goa–Mopa, Hyderabad, Navi Mumbai, Pune

== Connectivity ==
=== Road ===
The airport is connected to the city with the help of National Highway 753F (NH-753F), passing just beside the airport.

=== Rail ===
The nearest railway station is Jalgaon Junction railway station, located about 9.5 km (5.9 mi) north of the airport.

== See also ==
- List of airports in Maharashtra
- List of airports in India
- UDAN Scheme
- Ajanta Caves
- Tourism in Maharashtra
