= Solapur Airport =

Airport in Maharashtra, India

- IATA: SSE; ICAO: VASL

Summary
- Airport type: Public
- Owner: Government of India
- Operator: Airports Authority of India
- Serves: Solapur
- Location: Solapur, Maharashtra
- Opened: Reopened on September 24, 2024
- Focus city for: Solapur
- Elevation AMSL: 1,584 ft (483 m)
- Coordinates: 17°37′30″N 75°56′10″E
- Website: https://www.aai.aero/en/airports/solapur

Map
- Location within Maharashtra Location within India

Runways
| Direction | Length | | Surface |
| Direction | ft | m | Surface |
|---|---|---|---|
| 15/33 | 6,591 | 2,009 | Asphalt |

Statistics (April 2025 – March 2026)
- Passengers: 26,375 (▲ -%)
- Aircraft movements: 704 (▲ -%)
- Cargo tonnage: —
- Source: AAI

Solapur Airport (IATA: SSE, ICAO: VASL) is a public airport located in Solapur, in the state of Maharashtra, India.

== History ==
The airport was built by Indian Defence Authorities in September 1948 during the police action operation on the ex-Hyderabad State. The base, however, was not maintained after the operation. It was re-built in 1987 and was run and maintained by the Public Works Department.

Kingfisher Red operated an ATR 72 service to Mumbai in February 2009 four times a week but was discontinued in August 2010.

== Proposed New Airport ==
Citing lack of space for expansion, The State Government has taken a decision to develop a new Green Field "Code-D" airport at a cost of Rs. 310 Crores near Boramani village about 15 Kilometres North-east from the current airport. Maharashtra Airport Development Company (MADC) is acquiring about 650 Ha. of land for developing and developing the commercial area around the airport to support this airport 549.34 hectares of which is already government land. Solapur airport has been listed as one among 51 new low-cost airports that were announced by the Government in July 2013. MADC decided in October 2013 that it would develop Boramani airport by forming a special purpose vehicle (SPV) in the form of joint venture company (JVC) with the Airports Authority of India (AAI). AAI will have a 51 per cent stake in the JVC, while MADC will have 49 per cent. The present value of the land at Boramani and the amount required for rehabilitation of project-affected persons will be treated as MADC's share on the state government's behalf. AAI will keep the existing Hotgi airport in Solapur fully operational until Boramani becomes operational after which, Hotgi airport property will be commercially exploited by the JVC. Demarcation of the airport boundary walls began in October 2013. But as the forest department has declined to lend their land for this project, this project still remains on hold (as of year 2024).

== Airlines and destinations ==
| Airlines | Destinations |
|---|---|
| Fly91 | Goa–Mopa,Hyderabad |
| Star Air | Bengaluru, Mumbai |
