= Karad Airport =

Airport in Maharashtra, India

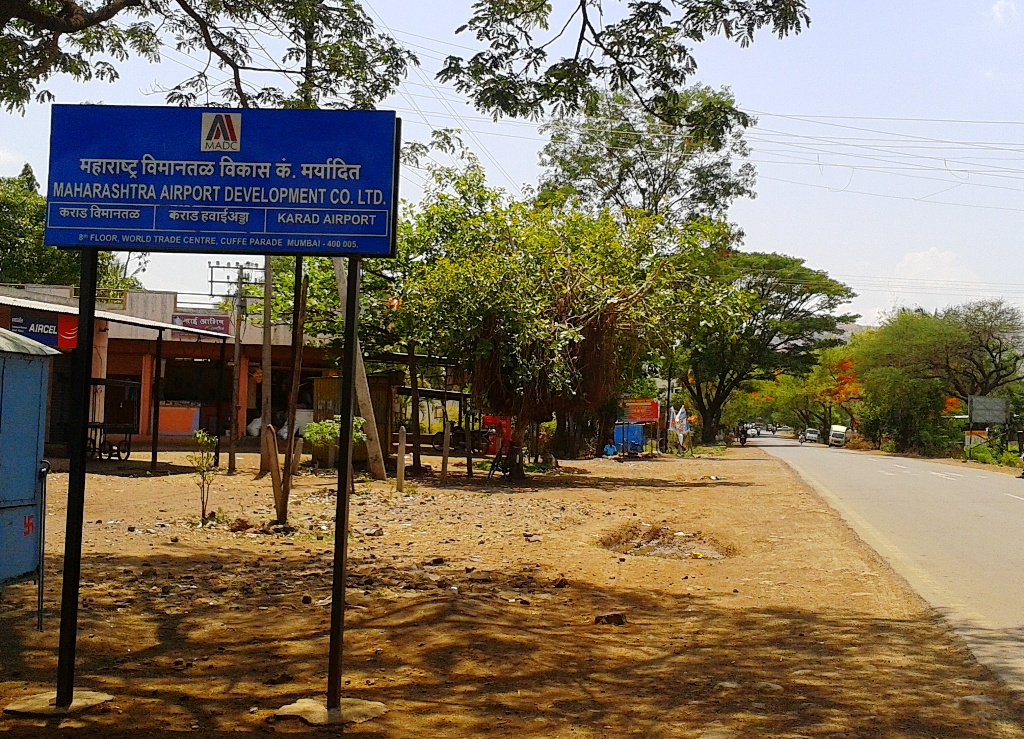
- IATA: none; ICAO: VA1M

Summary
- Airport type: Public
- Owner: M.A.D.C.
- Operator: M.A.D.C.
- Serves: Karad
- Location: Karad, Maharashtra, India
- Elevation AMSL: 1,890 ft (580 m)
- Coordinates: 17°17′09″N 074°09′29″E

Map
- Location within Maharashtra

Runways
Direction	Length		Surface
Direction	ft	m	Surface
10/28	4,200	1,280	Paved
- World Aero Data

Karad Airport (ICAO: VA1M) is in the Satara district of Maharashtra state in India. Its airstrip was built in 1955 by the Public Works Department to facilitate the Koyna dam project. The airport is currently used for general aviation and piloting.

It currently covers 65 acres; the acquisition of more than 100 acres has been proposed. Runway 10/28 is 1280 metres long and 30 metres wide with a 60-by-60-metre apron. No navigational aids or night landing facilities are available on the airstrip.

== Future Plans ==
The central run Maharashtra Airport Development Company (MADC) plans to extend the 1,250 metres airstrip by another 1,500m and widen it by 150m. The Airports Authority of India (AAI) has submitted its technical feasibility report to the MADC for examination which in turn has handed it over to the Maharashtra Government for final approval.
