= Maharashtra Airport Development Company =

- Type: Special-purpose company
- Industry: Airport Development
- Founded: 2002
- Founder: Government of Maharashtra
- Headquarters: Mumbai, India
- Key people: Swathi Pandey MD
- Owner: State Government of Maharashtra
- Website: madcindia.org

Maharashtra Airport Development Company Limited abbreviated as (MADC), is a Special Purpose Company constituted in 2002 by the Government of Maharashtra (GoM) to plan, construct, operate and maintain airports in the State. The government has entrusted MADC the task of developing three `greenfield' and six `brownfield' airports, and a heliport at Gadchiroli. MADC was also to play a lead role in the planning and implementation of the Multi-modal International Cargo Hub and Airport at Nagpur (MIHAN) project,

In April 2017, a report by the Comptroller and Auditor General of India (CAG) criticised the MADC for not developing a single airport in the state due to absence of a long-term plan, despite 14 years of its existence. The report also stated that Grants given by the state government for development of airports were lying unused, thus "blocking up" the public money.

Keeping in mind all the key objectives, MADC was formed with equity participation from City and Industrial Development Corporation Ltd. (CIDCO), Nagpur Improvement Trust (NIT), Maharashtra Industrial Development Corporation (MIDC), Maharashtra State Road Development Corporation Ltd. (MSRDC) and the Nagpur Municipal Corporation (NMC). The master plan of MIHAN consists of a Special Economic Zone comprising an Information Technology City, a Health City, a Captive Power Plant and other Manufacturing and Value Added units.

== Other projects ==
=== Existing airports ===
The MADC has been tasked with developing some existing airports in Non-Metropolitan regions of Maharashtra. These are :

- Amravati Airport
- Chandrapur Airstrip
- Dhule Airport
- Jalgaon Airport
- Karad Airport
- Phaltan Airstrip
- Solapur Airport

The remaining airports in the State of Maharashtra continue to remain under the jurisdiction of the MIDC.

=== Greenfield airports ===
The Government has approved proposals for developing three greenfield airports.

- Shirdi Airport
- Chhatrapati Sambhaji Raje International Airport near Purandhar in Pune district
- Boramani International Airport in Solapur

== See also ==
- MADC-Official Website
- Multi-modal International Cargo Hub and Airport at Nagpur (MIHAN)
- Nagpur Improvement Trust (NIT)
- Nagpur
- Vidarbha
- Maharashtra Industrial Development Corporation (MIDC)
- Airports Authority of India (AAI)
- Nagpur Airport
