= Transport in Maharashtra =

Maharashtra is a state in western India. It is the country's second-most-populous state and third-largest state by area. Maharashtra is bordered by the Arabian Sea on the west, Gujarat and the Union territory of Dadra and Nagar Haveli on the northwest, Madhya Pradesh on the north and northeast, Chhattisgarh on the east, Karnataka on the south, Telangana on the southeast and Goa on the southwest. The state covers 307,731 km^{2} (118,816 sq mi), or 9.84 percent of India's total area.

Mumbai, Maharashtra's capital city, is India's largest city and its financial capital. Maharashtra has three modes of public transportation: road, rail and air. The state has two major ports, both in the Mumbai region: Jawaharlal Nehru Port (JNPT) and Mumbai Port.

== Human power ==
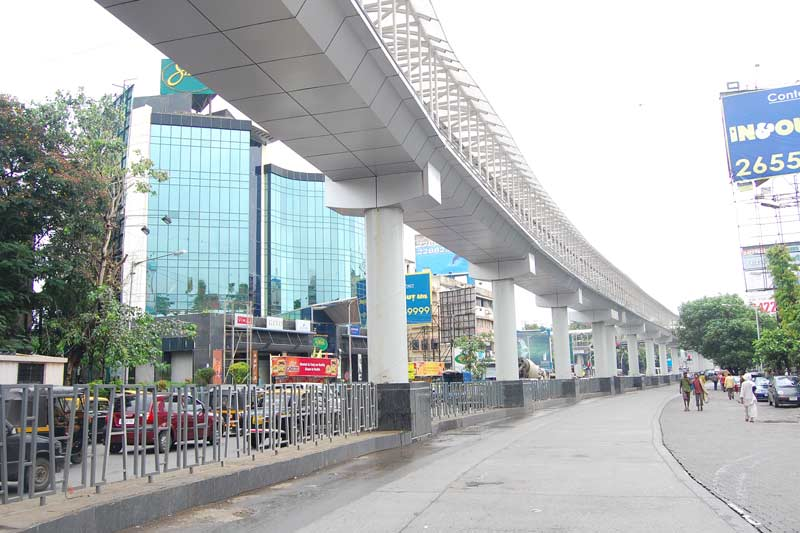
Bandra West Skywalk

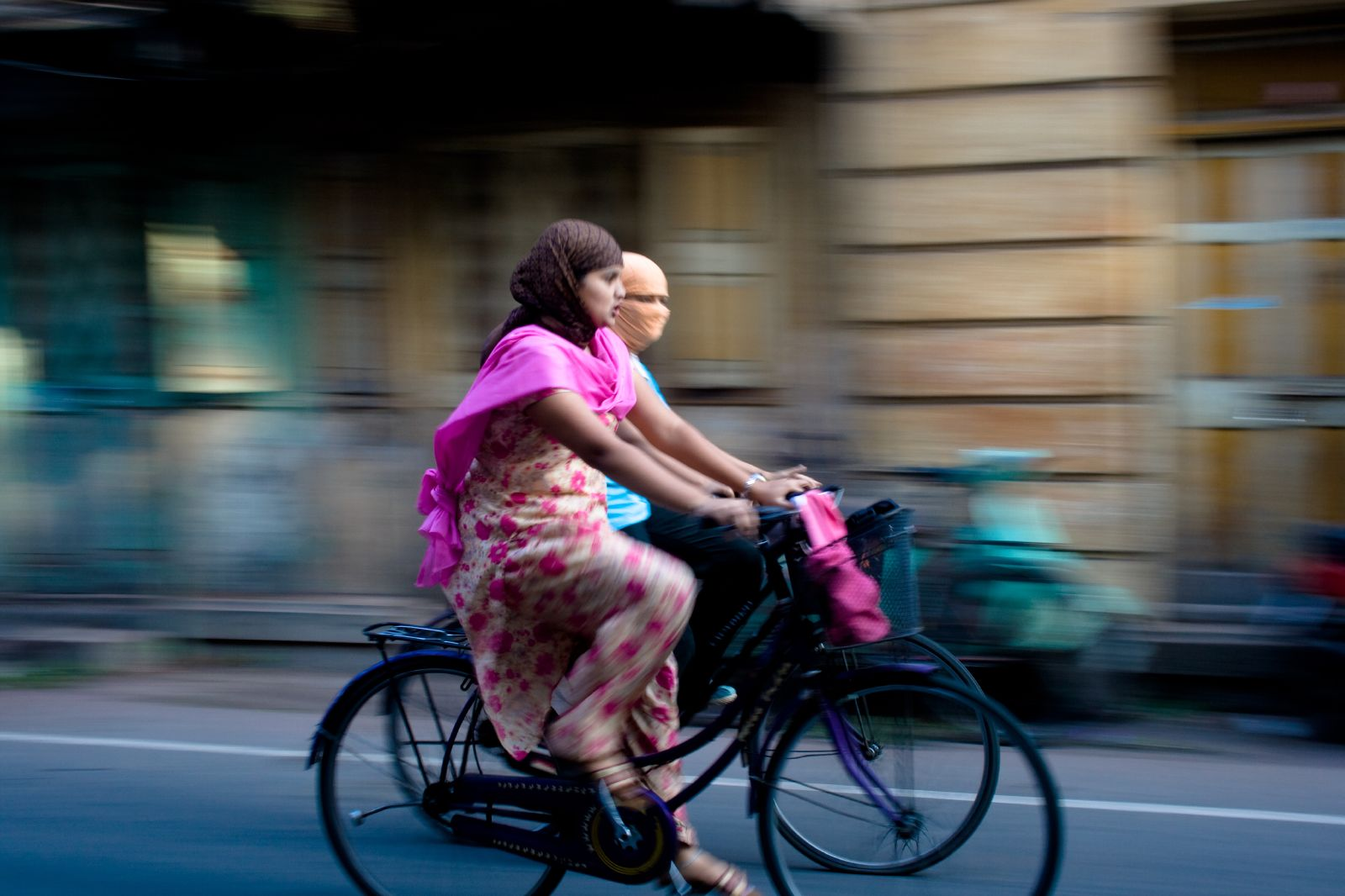
Women bicycling in Pune

In rural areas of Maharashtra, walking remains a common mode of transport. In large cities, such as Mumbai and Pune, skywalks have been proposed or are under construction to enhance pedestrian safety and convenience; the Mumbai Metropolitan Region Development Authority has begun construction of more than 50 such skywalks.

There is a high level of bicycle ownership in the state. Along with walking, cycling accounts for a significant number of commuter trips in rural and urban areas Pune was long known as the bicycle city of India. During the 1970s, bicycles began to be replaced by motorcycles. To combat pollution and ease traffic congestion, government development authorities are encouraging the use of separate bicycle lanes next to motor traffic.

== Animal powered ==
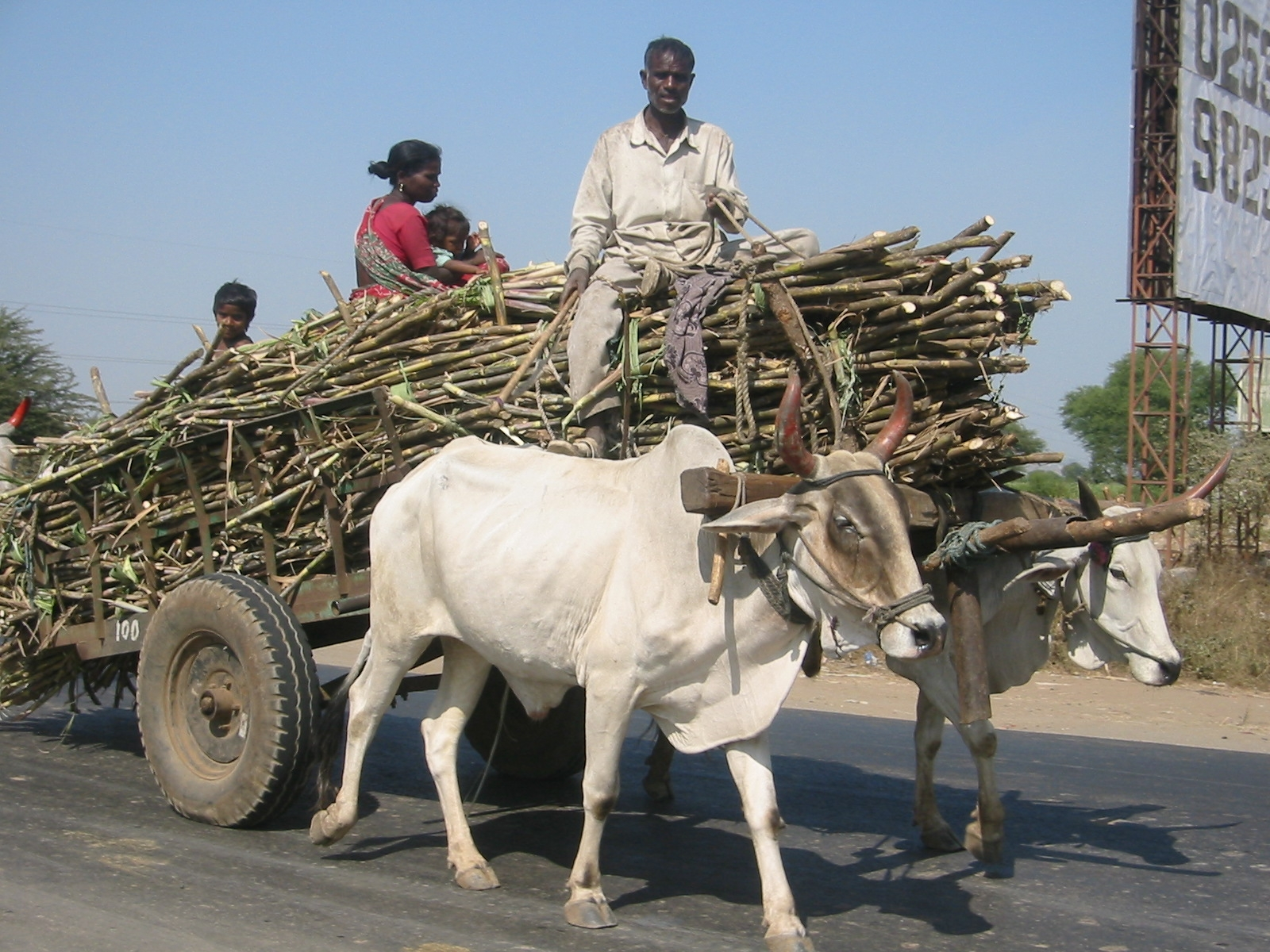
Bullock cart hauling sugarcane

Bullock carts have historically been the most common mode of transport in Maharashtra for goods and, to a lesser extent, for people. They are still used in rural areas for transporting goods to homes and farms, or for transporting produce such as sugarcane to a mill. Khillari cattle have been the most popular for use as oxen.

Horses (riding and draft), donkeys, and elephants are other animals which have been used in the region for transport. The indigenous Bhimthadi horse was popular for riding at the time of the Maratha Empire. During the British colonial era, the horse-drawn Tanga and Victoria were popular modes of transport in urban areas. They began to be replaced by motorized, three-wheeled auto rickshaws for intermediate public transport during the 1960s. Donkeys are still used on building sites for carrying sand, but (unlike the Middle East) are not used for riding.

== Road transport ==
At 267,452 kilometres (166,187 mi), Maharashtra has India's largest road network. Seventeen national highways connect Maharashtra to six neighbouring states. The state's national highways are 4,688 kilometres (2,913 mi) long. Maharashtra also has a large state-highway network; in March 2018, 99.5 percent of the state's villages were connected by all-weather roads. The Yeshwantrao Chavan Mumbai-Pune Expressway, India's first controlled-access toll road, became fully operational in April 2002.

The Maharashtra State Road Transport Corporation (MSRTC) has been providing public-sector road passenger service since 1948, linking most of the state's towns and villages in a large network. These buses, popularly known as ST (State Transport), are the preferred mode of transport for much of Maharashtra's population. In addition to the government-run buses, private luxury buses serve major population centres. Other modes of public road transport, such as the seven-seat Tempo, have become popular in semi-urban areas. The Bandra Worli sea link is one of the longest bridges in the country. It was opened in 2009. The Trans Harbour bridge is the longest bridge in India and was on 12 January 2024, after the prime minister, Narendra Modi, inaugurated the bridge. It connects Bombay with Navi Mumbai.

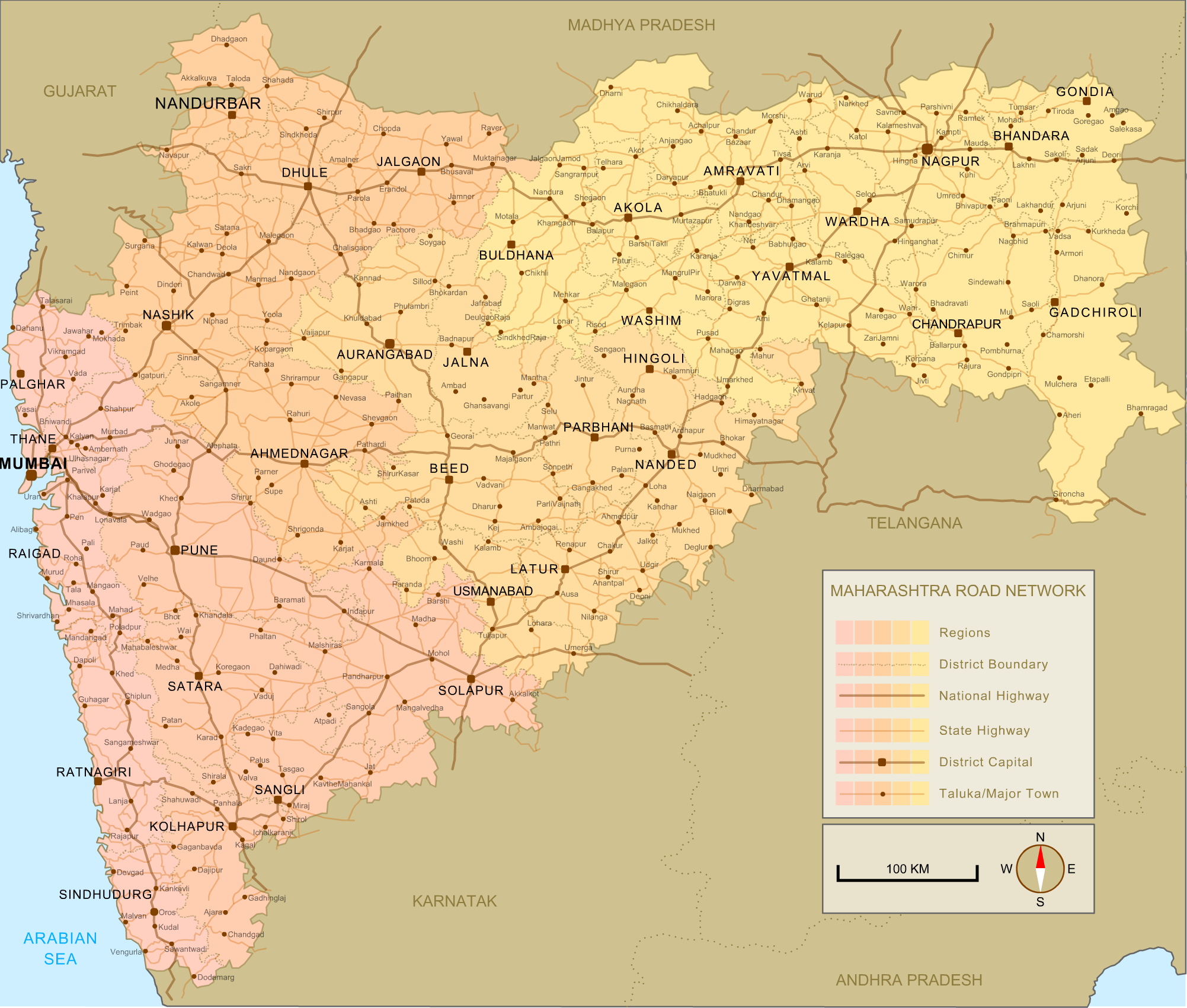
Major roads in Maharashtra

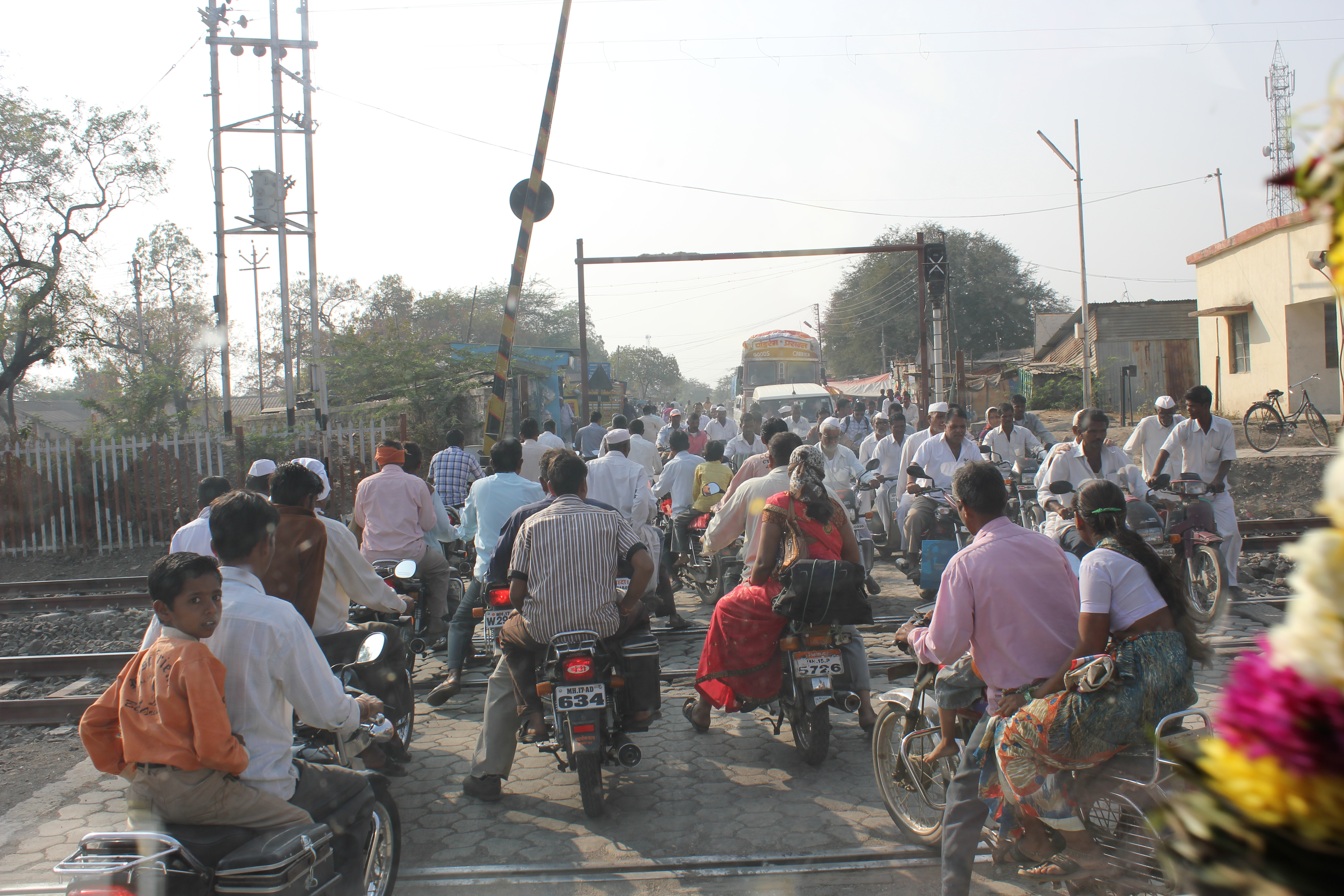
Puntamba railway crossing

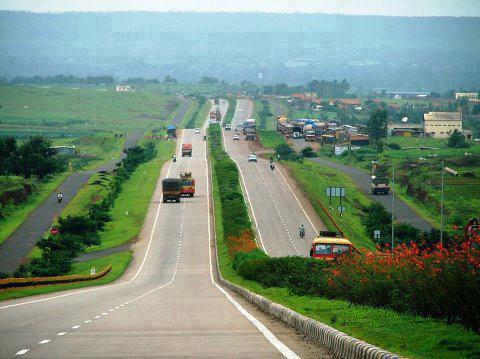
Mumbai–Nashik Expressway

== Railways ==
Rail transport is primarily provided by Indian Railways, part of the Ministry of Railways and divided into eighteen zones. IR is sub-divided into sixty-seven divisions, each with a divisional headquarters.

Maharashtra is connected to other parts of India with a 5,983-kilometre (3,718 mi) rail network, and contains many IR zone and division headquarters:

- IR's Central and Western zones are headquartered in Mumbai at Chhatrapati Shivaji Maharaj Terminus (CSMT) and Churchgate, respectively.
- Nagpur Junction houses the CR and SEC divisions of the Central and South East Central zones, respectively.
- The Nanded division of the South Central Railway zone, which serves Maharashtra's Marathwada region, and
- The Konkan Railway zone, an IR subsidiary based in CBD Belapur, Navi Mumbai, which serves the Konkan coastal region and continues down the country's west coast.

The Mumbai and Pune Suburban Railways carry about 8.0 million passengers daily. Maharashtra also has metro and monorail networks. Metro systems are operational in Mumbai, Nagpur, Navi Mumbai, and Pune. The Greater Nashik Metro, being built by Maharashtra Metro Rail Corporation Limited (Maha Metro), is planned to connect the city with suburban areas such as Nashik Road, Nashik Airport and Sinnar. A monorail system is operational in Mumbai. Mumbai had tram service until 1964, when it was replaced by expanded bus service.

A rail tunnel under the sea is planned. It will link the UAE with the western coast of India. The tunnel will be supported by pontoons and will be nearly 2000 kilometres in length.

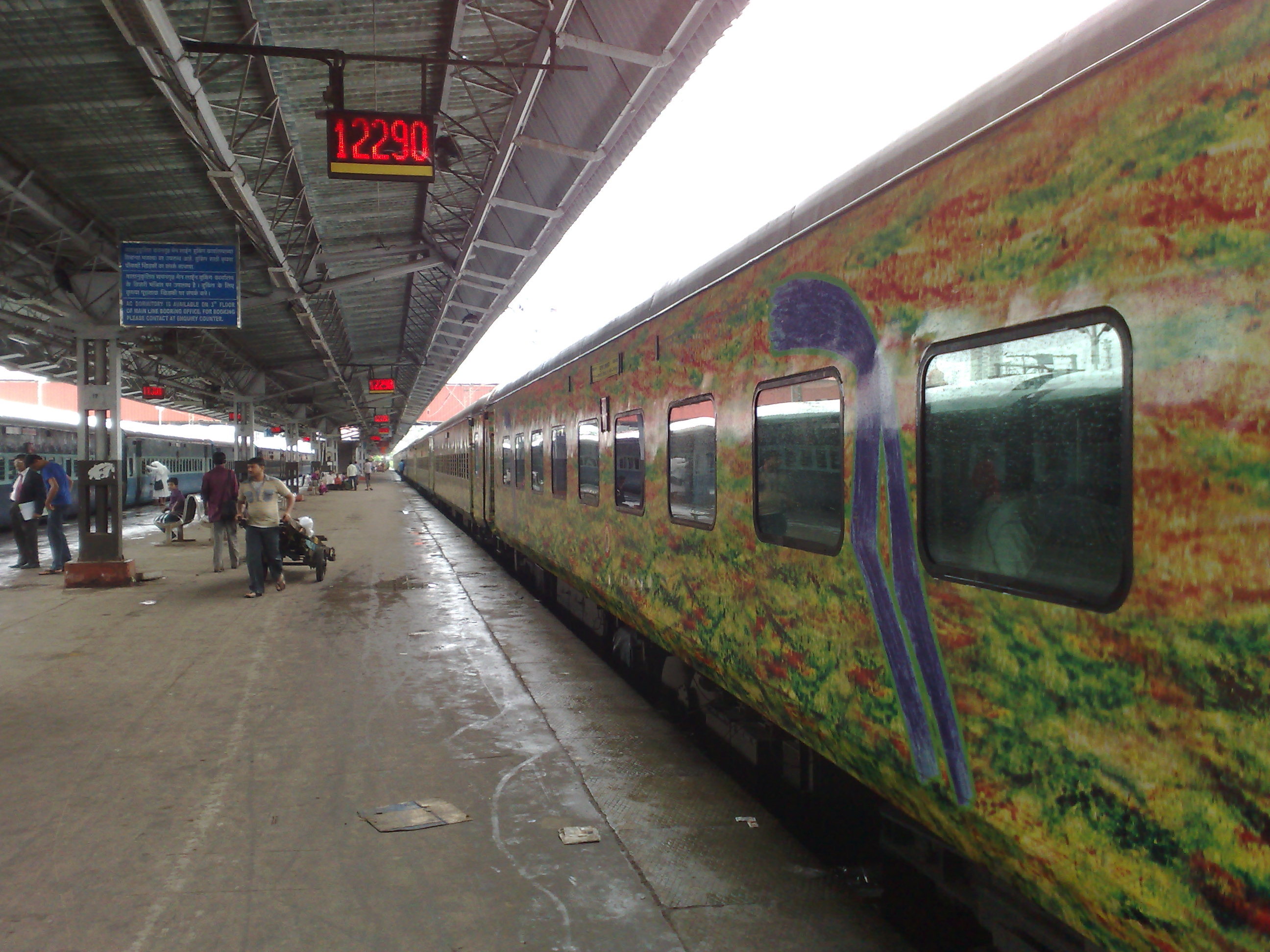
IR's Nagpur Duronto Express

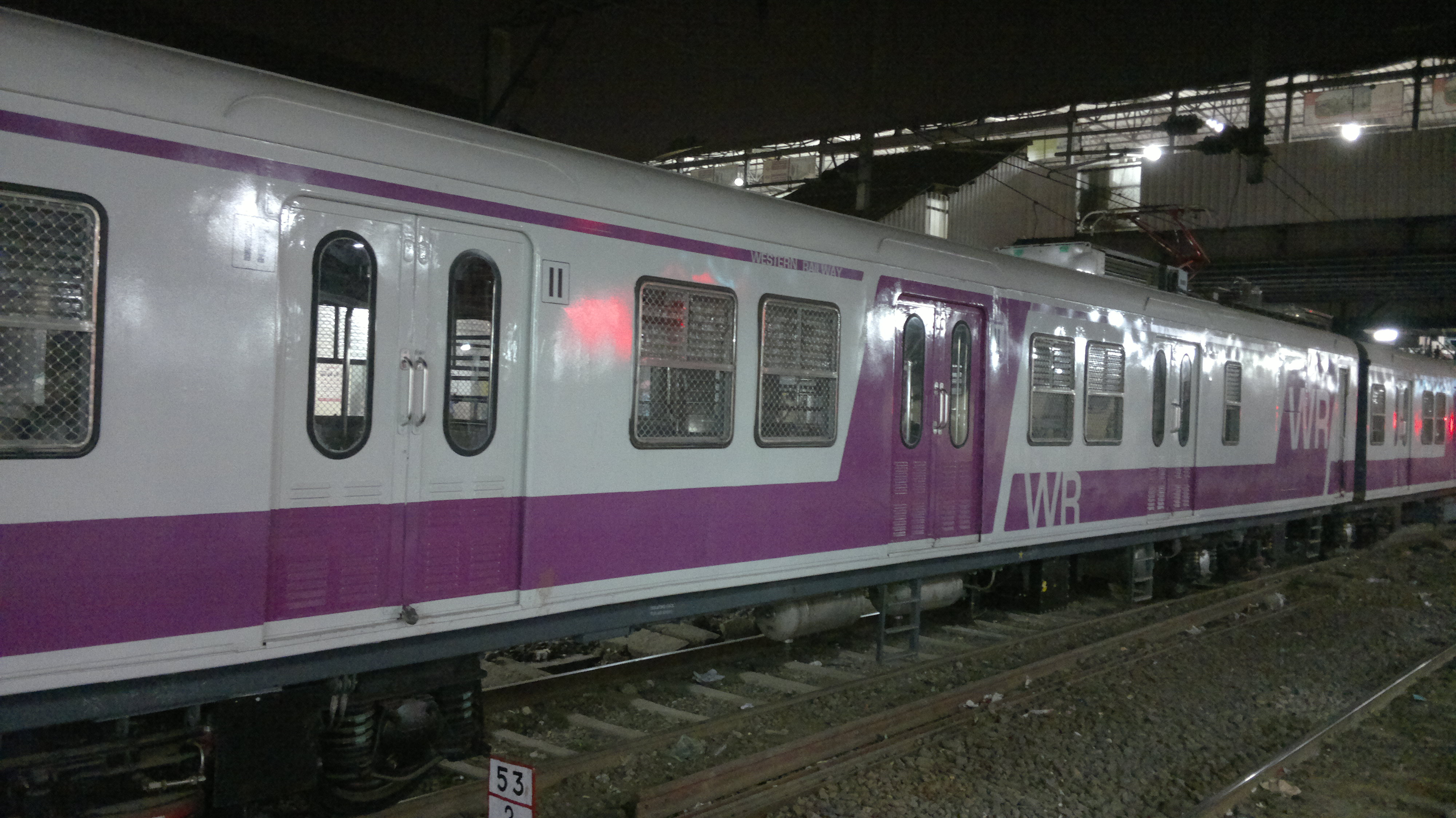
Western Railway local train

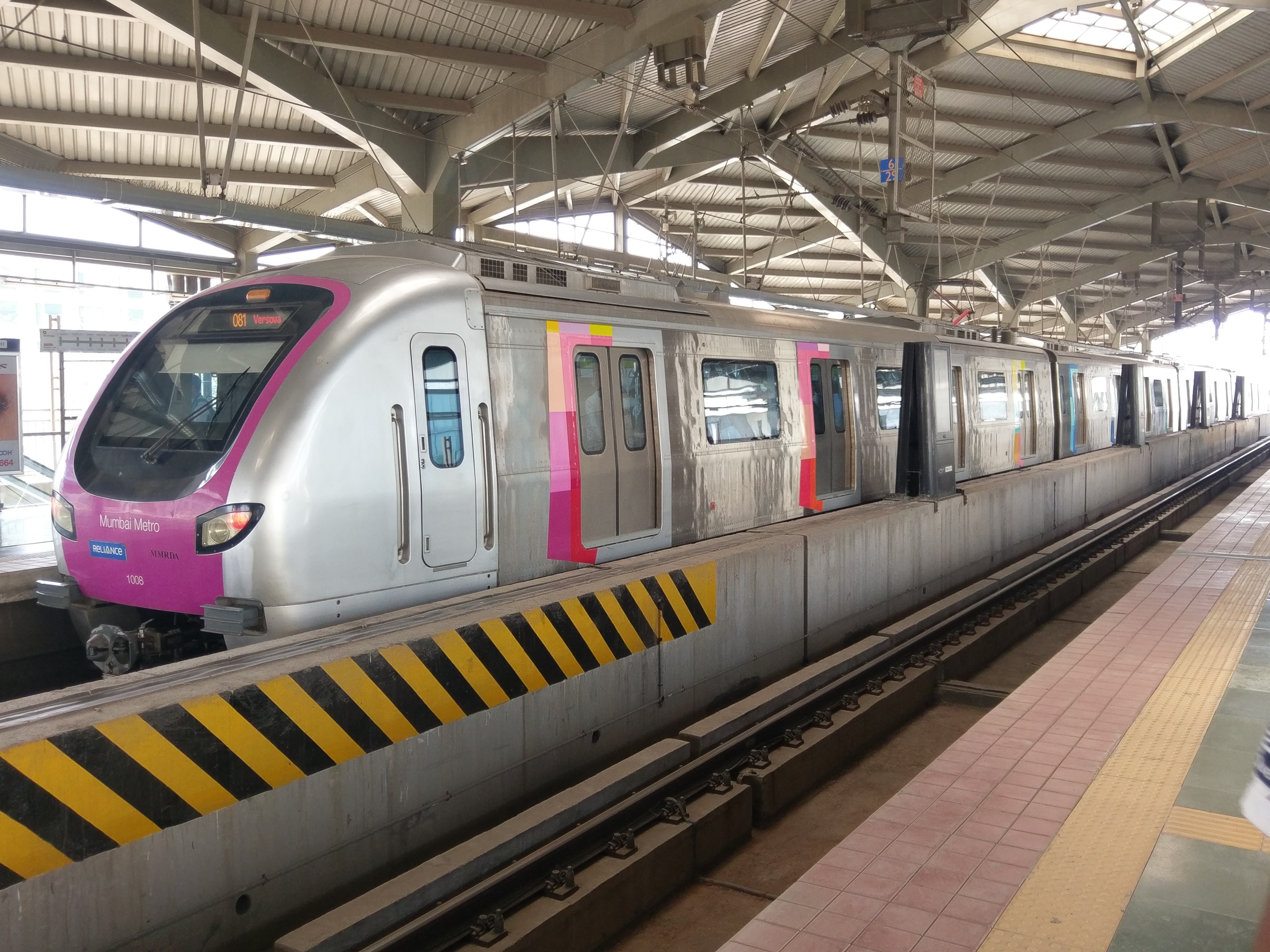
Mumbai Metro train

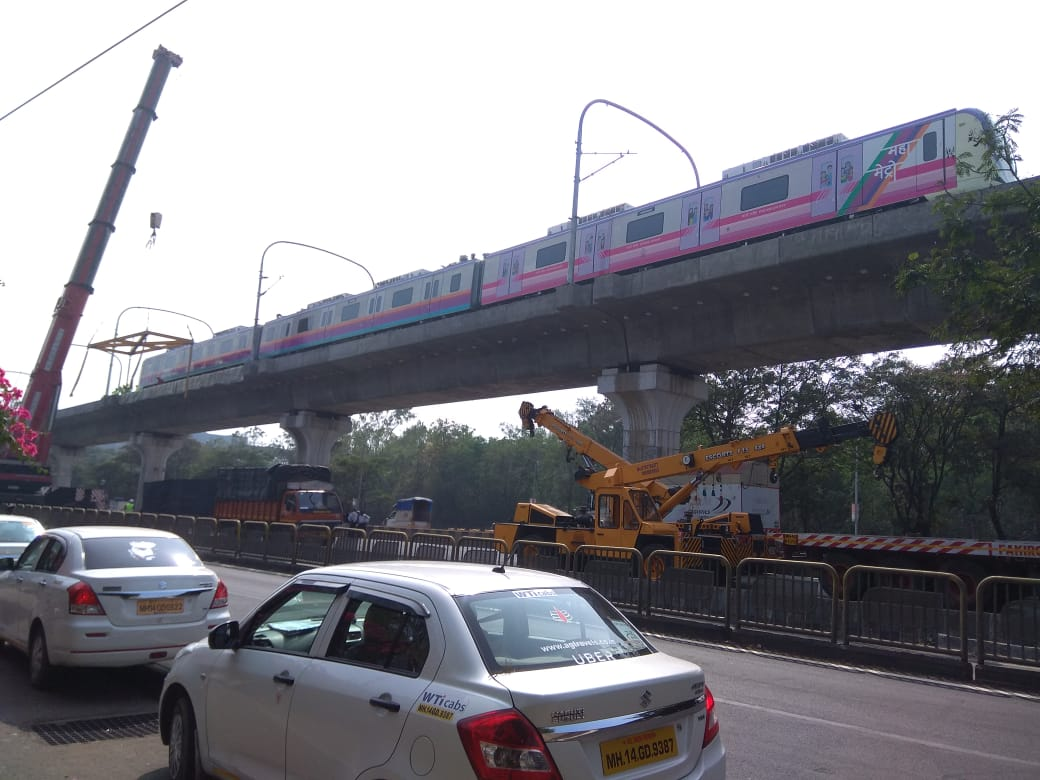
Pune Metro trial coaches in 2019

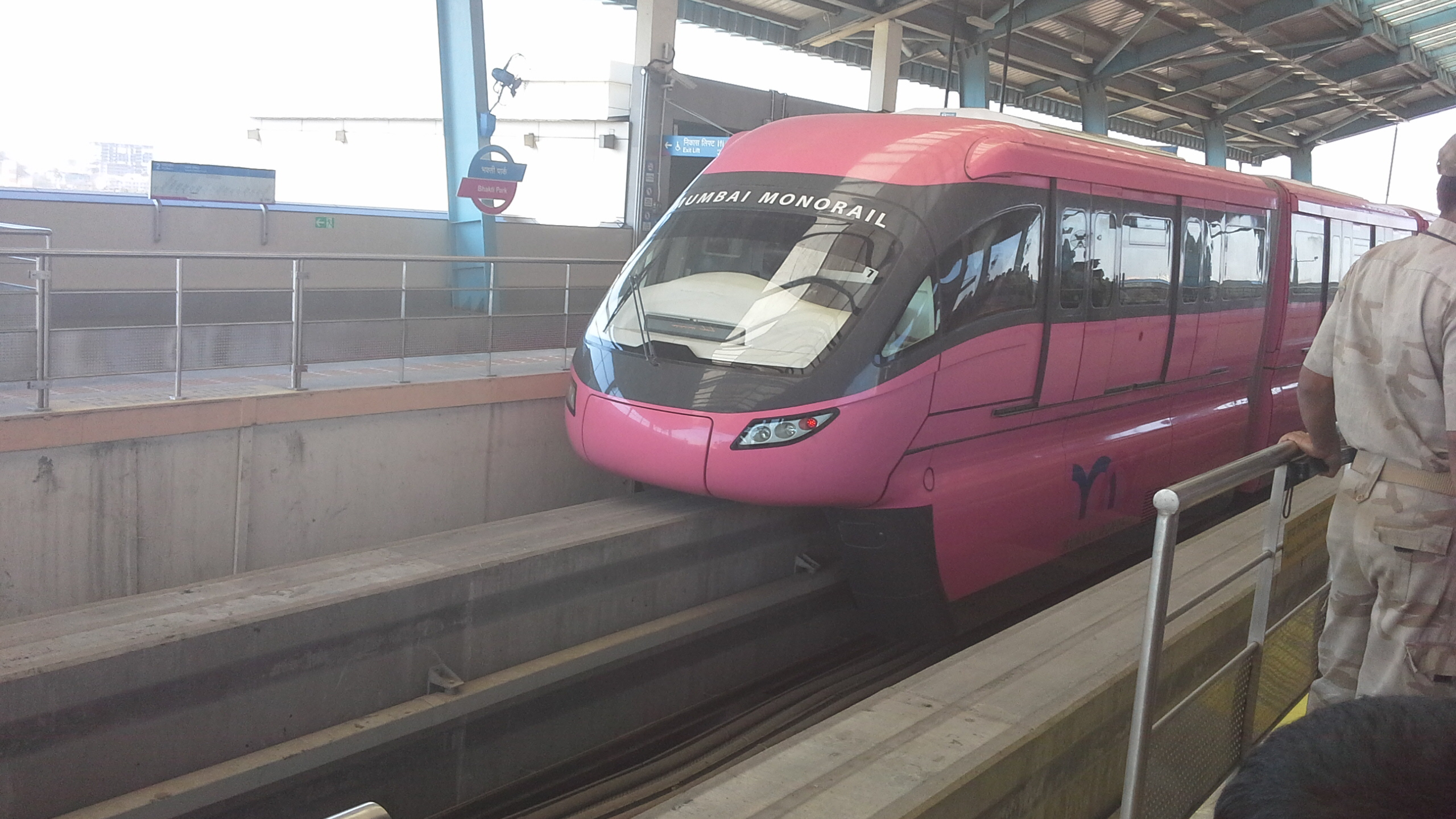
Mumbai Monorail

== Air ==
Civil aviation in Maharashtra began in the 1920s with Juhu Aerodrome, one of India's first and a base for J. R. D. Tata's Tata Airlines during the 1930s. The maharaja of Kolhapur State built an airfield in Kolhapur in 1939, and offered a subsidy to Air Services of India to operate air service to Juhu. Small airstrips had been built by the 1940s at Phaltan, Sangli, Akola and Gondia in addition to larger airfields at Santacruz, Pune and Nagpur, built by the Indian Air Force and also used for civil aviation. During the 1980s and 1990s, Vayudoot served ten airports in the state.

=== Airports ===
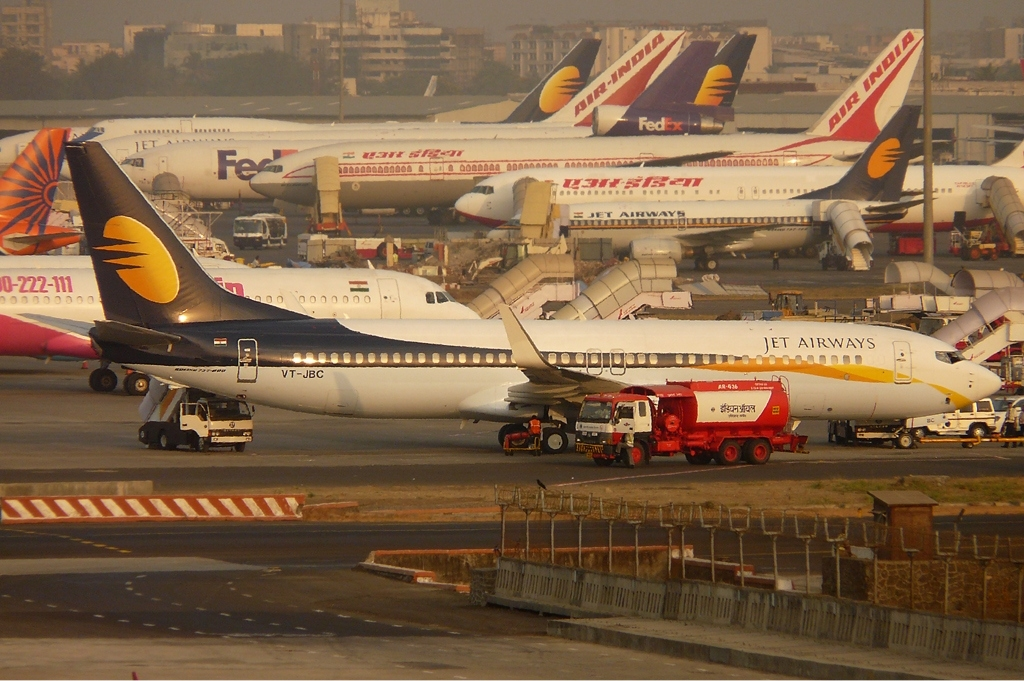
Chhatrapati Shivaji Maharaj International Airport is one of the world's busiest.

Most of Maharashtra's airfields are operated by the Airports Authority of India (AAI); Reliance Airport Developers (RADPL) operate five smaller airports at Latur, Nanded, Baramati, Osmanabad and Yavatmal on a 95-year lease. The Maharashtra Airport Development Company (MADC) was founded in 2002 to develop airports in the state which are not under the AAI or the Maharashtra Industrial Development Corporation (MIDC). MADC is leading the planning and implementation of the Multi-modal International Cargo Hub and Airport at Nagpur (MIHAN) project.

Maharashtra has four international airports:

- Mumbai's Chhatrapati Shivaji Maharaj International Airport, India's second busiest
- Pune Airport, with flights to Dubai and Singapore
- Nagpur's Dr. Babasaheb Ambedkar International Airport
- Navi Mumbai International Airport

Major domestic airports of Maharashtra include:

- Aurangabad Airport
- Jalgaon Airport
- Nanded Airport
- Kolhapur Airport
- Nashik Airport

Airports at Akola, Amravati, Baramati, Chandrapur, Dhule, Gondia, Karad, Latur, Osmanabad, Ratnagiri, Solapur and Yavatmal do not have scheduled air service. There are also private airstrips at Aamby Valley City and Shirpur.

The MADC operates a greenfield airport at Shirdi, and IRB Infrastructure operates Sindhudurg Airport. A new passenger terminal at Nashik Airport was inaugurated in March 2014. The Navi Mumbai International Airport, being constructed by CIDCO for ₹90 billion (US$930 million), is expected to be completed and become operational by the end of 2025. The New Pune Airport is planned, in addition to greenfield airports at Boramani (near Solapur) and Gadchiroli.

== Water ==
The ports on the Konkan coast have historically been the gateway to the Deccan Plateau. Although most have diminished in importance, they remain fishing ports. Maharashtra's two principal ports, Mumbai Port and Jawaharlal Nehru Port (also in the Mumbai region), are controlled by the government of India. There are about 50 minor ports in Maharashtra; most handle passenger traffic, with limited capacity. None of the state's major rivers are navigable.

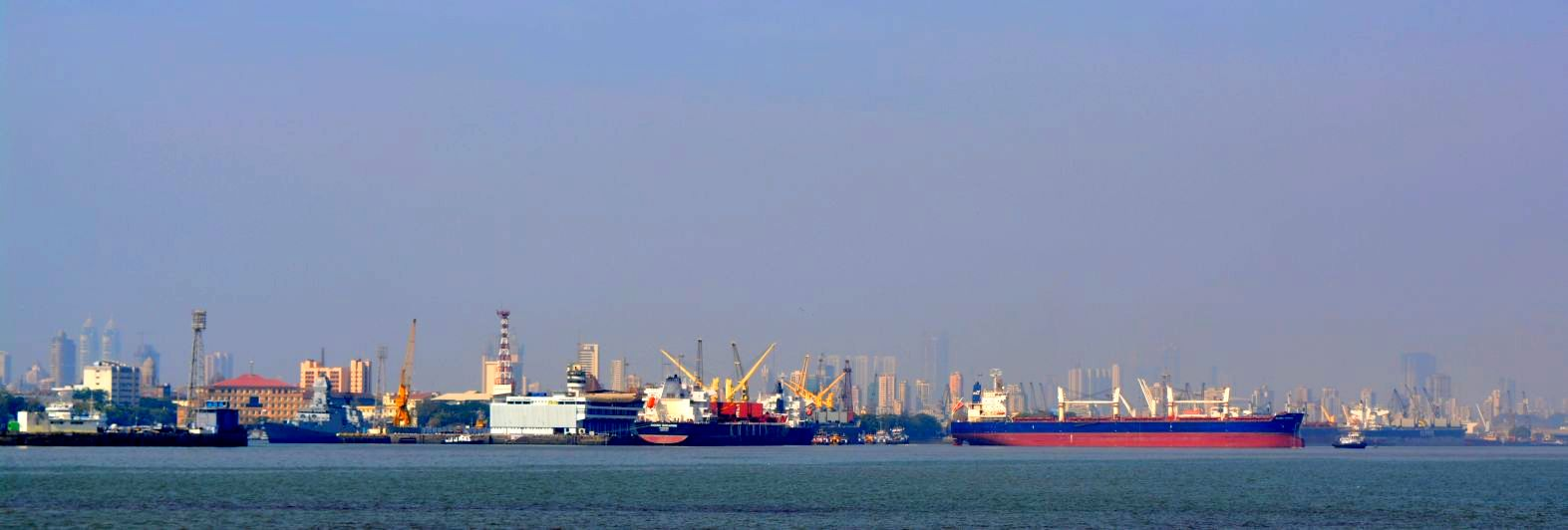
Ships at Mumbai Port

== See also ==
- Transport in India
