= Baramati Airport =

Airport in Maharashtra, India

Dadasaheb Ajit Anantrao Pawar Airport, Baramati
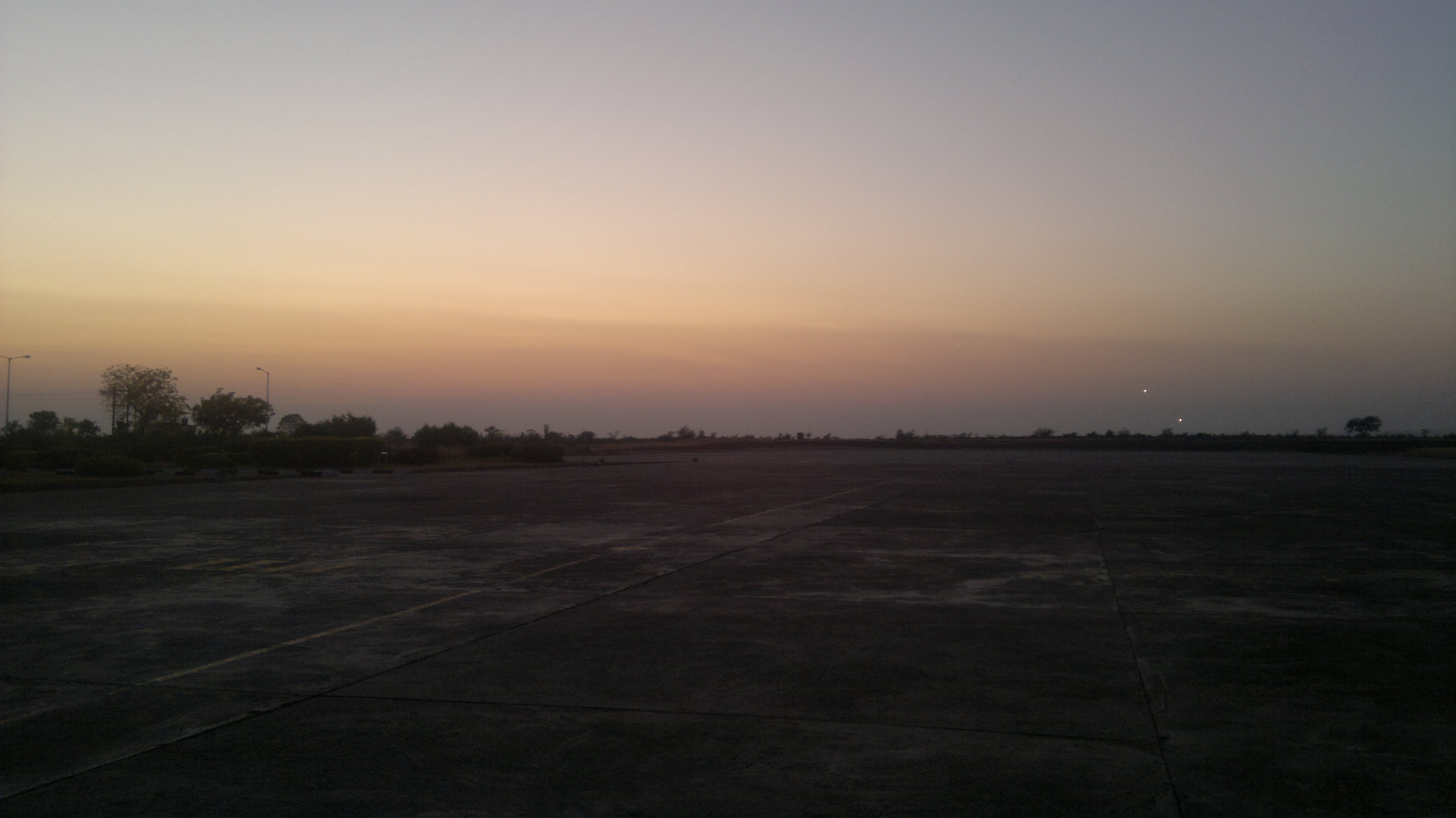
- IATA: none; ICAO: none

Summary
- Airport type: Public
- Owner: M.I.D.C.
- Operator: M.I.D.C.
- Serves: Baramati
- Location: Gojubavi, Baramati, Pune district, Maharashtra, India
- Elevation AMSL: 1,982 ft (604 m)
- Coordinates: 18°13′43″N 074°35′04″E

Map
- Location within Maharashtra

Runways
| Direction | Length | | Surface |
| Direction | ft | m | Surface |
|---|---|---|---|
| 11/29 | 5,807 | 1,770 | Paved |

Dadasaheb Ajit Anantrao Pawar Airport, Baramati is located in Baramati, Pune district of Maharashtra state in India. This airstrip was constructed by MIDC in 1996, at a distance of 12 km from Baramati city/ Baramati railway station. It is currently being used for general aviation and pilot training.

== Description ==
Elevation of the airfield is 604 metres MSL and is spread over an area of 182.5 hectares (451 acres). Runway 11/29 is 1770 metres long and 30 metres wide with turning pads at both ends. The Runway Strength is 16 LCN. Three taxiways connect the airstrip to two adjacent aprons measuring 180 by 100 metres and 100 by 75 metres. The airport has a 112 square metre terminal building and approach road.

== Facilities ==
The airport has an advisory tower (Freq.=129.25 MHz). The tower is managed by senior pilots from the adjacent Academy of Carver Aviation Pvt. Ltd. flight school. The senior pilots monitor traffic in the local airspace and give advisories over VHF frequency to the pilots flying in circuits and around the area.

The main apron parking capacity is 100 M x 75 M. There are currently no navigational or visual aids nor night landing facilities available on the airstrip other than the VHF communication and the windsock.

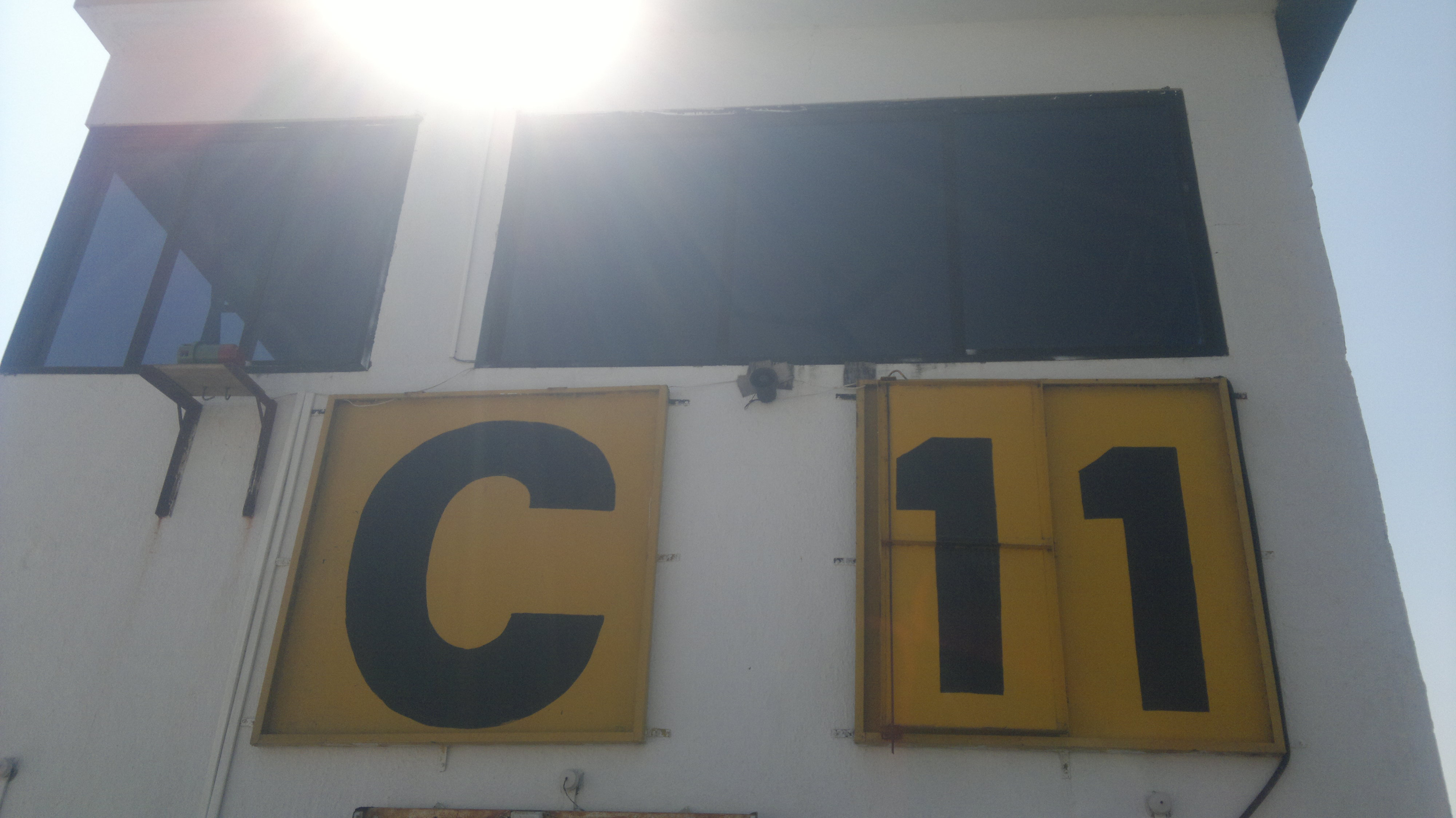
Advisory tower at Baramati Airport. Capital C indicates reporting place for pilots and other aviation personnel. 11 indicates that Runway 11 is in use.

== Future Plans ==
Reliance Airport Developers, an Anil Ambani group company, who had won a bid two years ago to run five airports, including Baramati in Maharashtra, on a 95-year lease, plans to develop Baramati as a hub for private jets, with airports in Mumbai and Pune facing acute shortage of parking bays. The apron at Baramati can safely accommodate 15 to 20 private jets.

== Accidents and incidents ==
On 14 March 2008, a Cessna 152, VT-ACC crashed into the Nira river south of the airport. The student pilot, carrying an unauthorized female passenger on a solo training sortie, had descended from the assigned altitude to do low flying over the river for fun. Having descended to around 50 ft above the river, the pilot failed to notice high tension electrical cables stretched across the river and as a result, the main landing gear got entangled in the cables and the aircraft crashed into the river. Both occupants sustained minor injuries. The aircraft sustained substantial damage.

On 5 February 2019, a Cessna 172, VT-RDX crashed near Indapur, Pune. The flight was a normal training session for a trainee pilot who took off at around 12:30 IST. The cause of the crash was a snag in the engine which lost him some altitude at around 3500 feet due to which the pilot tried to land on a road. However, the aircraft crash-landed off it, hitting some trees. No casualties were reported on the ground. The plane crash-landed around 100 feet from a village locality and more than 400 feet from a school. The pilot sustained a right hand fracture and minor injuries, to which he was later taken to the hospital. The aircraft sustained crucial damage and is more likely to be written off.

On 28 January 2026, at around 9:12 a.m., a business jet carrying the deputy CM Ajit Pawar, crashed and exploded on second landing attempt, killing him and four others. The aircraft involved was VT-SSK, a Learjet 45XR operated by VSR Aviation.

== See also ==
- Pune Airport
- New Pune International Airport
- Guru Gobind Singhji Airport - Nanded
- Latur Airport
- Osmanabad Airport
- Yavatmal airport
