= RJW =

RJW may refer to:

- RJW, the Indian Railways station code for Rajewadi railway station, Pune, Maharashtra, India
- RJW, the Kereta Api Indonesia station code for Rajawali railway station, Jakarta, Indonesia
