= Shreenagar (Thane) =

Locality in Thane, India

Shreenagar (Marathi: श्रीनगर) is a village in Thane, in the state of Maharashtra, India.

== Location ==
Shreenagar is located at the border of Thane and Mumbai. It is approximately 5 km from Thane railway station and 4 km from Mulund railway station. It is bordered by Sanjay Gandhi National Park to the west.

== Demographics and culture ==
Shreenagar has a predominantly Maharashtrian culture. In addition to Marathi speakers, there are sizable populations of South Indians, Gujaratis, and people from various other regions. Ganesh Chaturthi is celebrated for ten days at Shreenagar Ground. Navratri is also observed for nine days. Mahashivratri is celebrated at Shri Ayyappa Mandir for one day. Other festivals such as Holi, Diwali, Kojagiri, and Christmas are also celebrated in this area.

== Transport ==
The nearest bus stops are located in Kisan Nagar, Vaishali Nagar and Wagle Estate. Auto rickshaws are also easily available.
