= Butibori Power Plant =

Thermal power plant

Butibori Power Project
- Country: India
- Location: Butibori, Maharashtra
- Coordinates: 20.9284°N 78.9336°E
- Status: Closed
- Construction began: 2009
- Commission date: August 2013
- Decommission date: 2019
- Operator: R-Power

Thermal power station
- Primary fuel: Coal

Power generation
- Units operational: 2
- Units planned: 3
- Units cancelled: 1
- Units decommissioned: 2
- Nameplate capacity: 600 MW

Butibori Power Project is a coal-based thermal power plant located at Butibori near Nagpur in the Indian state of Maharashtra. The power plant is operated by the Reliance Power.

The Engineering, procurement and construction contract is given to Reliance Infrastructure and Shanghai Electric Corporation of People's Republic of China is supplying the boiler, turbine and generator (BTG) for the power plant. Along with Power generation units, there are two reservoirs of water, one of which has intake from the MIDC area and the other from the nearby Wadgaon dam. The premises of the power plant also include a Coal Handling Plant (CHP), an Ash Handling Plant (AHP) and a Water Treatment Plant.

The basis for generation of electricity in this plant is the reheat Rankine cycle.

== Working Process ==
The plant has two 72 m high tangentially fired, water tube boilers. The boilers have a capacity of 1024 m^{3}/hr each, with the output steam being supplied at 167 bar and 540 °C. The boilers are heated by coal. The coal is initially about 300 mm in size. It is crushed to 20 mm and then put into a coal mill, which pulverizes it into extremely fine powder of around 70 microns. The powdered coal is then supplied to the top of the boilers via tubes and primary air (PA) fans, where it is burnt to generate heat and convert the water in the boilers to steam.

The steam generated in the boilers is then supplied to the turbine, which is coupled to a generator. The steam is supplied via 2 out of 3 boiler feed pumps. Two pumps are always active, while one pump is on standby. The turbines run at a constant speed of 3000 rpm, so as to provide a steady output of 50 Hz. The turbines are divided into 3 parts : High Pressure (HP) turbine, Intermediate Pressure (IP) turbine and a Low Pressure (LP) turbine. The steam is supplied to the HP, which sends it back for reheating. This reheated steam then goes to the IP and the LP, which in turn run the generator to produce electricity.

The steam let out from the turbine goes to a condenser, which converts the steam into water to be reused in the boiler.

The burning of coal releases ash and flue gases. The flue gases are released out into the surroundings, 220 m above the ground level via two chimneys. Post combustion, the mixture of flue gases and ash passes over an Electrostatic Precipitator (ESP). This attracts the ash particles, which are usually positively or negatively charged, to its surface and lets the uncharged flue gases through to the chimneys. This ESP has 8 stages, to even out the accumulation of ash and prevent overloading. The ash is collected in a storage via a hopper. This ash is then carried away to the AHP until it is shipped if the need arises.

Before the water is supplied into the boilers, it is treated in the water treatment plant, which removes all dissolved minerals in the water, disinfects it and removes dissolved air and silica. The turbidity of water is also reduced to less than 1 NTU. Chemicals used in the Water treatment plant are Lime Dolomite, Poly electrolyte, Chlorine gas, SMBS (Sodium metabisulphate) and an antiscalant.

== Capacity ==
It has an installed capacity of 600 MW.

Unit No.	Generating Capacity	Commissioned on	Status
1	300 MW	2012 August	Stooped (non-functional)
2	300 MW	2013 December	Stooped (non-functional)

Although the plant has a capacity of 660 MW, it supplies only about 540 MW to the grid. 30% of the power generated is used to run the plant itself.

== Status updates ==
Vidarbha Industries Power Limited (VIPL), a subsidiary of Reliance Power Limited, has made 141 out of its 170 staffers at the 600 MW Butibori power plant tender their resignation. The plant was closed since January 2019 and the staffers were doing only maintenance and preservation work. The remaining 29 staffers will continue this work. Station director Rajendra Kale said the plant had closed down due to regulatory issues after Adani Power took over Reliance’s power distribution business in Mumbai. “We initially closed one 300 MW unit and then had to close the second one too,” he added.
