= Nanded Airport =

Airport serving Nanded, Maharashtra, India

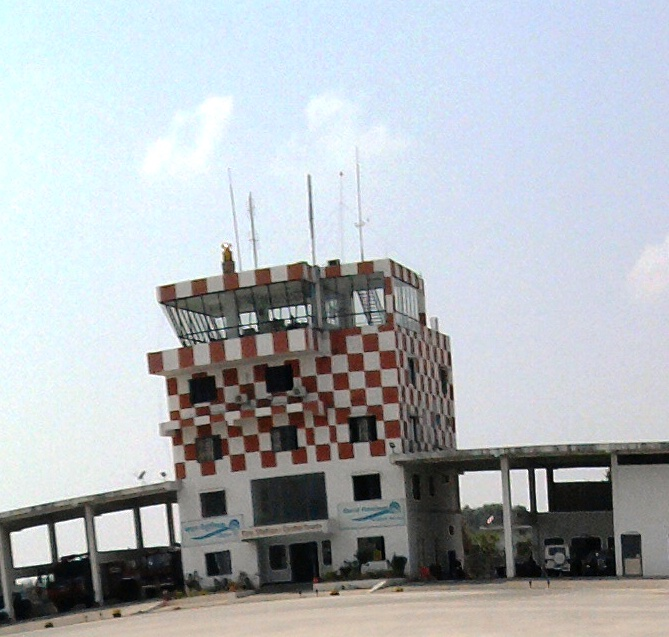
- IATA: NDC; ICAO: VAND

Summary
- Airport type: Public
- Owner: Maharashtra Industrial Development Corporation (MIDC)
- Operator: Nanded Airport Private Limited (NADL)
- Serves: Nanded
- Location: Nanded, Maharashtra, India
- Opened: 1958; 68 years ago
- Built: Reliance Airport Developers
- Elevation AMSL: 374 m (1,227 ft)
- Coordinates: 19°10′55″N 077°19′07″E
- Website: Nanded Airport

Map
- Location within Maharashtra Location within India

Runways
| Direction | Length | | Surface |
| Direction | ft | m | Surface |
|---|---|---|---|
| 10/28 | 7,546 | 2,300 | Concrete/Asphalt |

Statistics (April 2025 – March 2026)
- Passengers: 1,47,394 (▲13.3%)
- Aircraft movements: 2847 (▼ -4.6%)
- Cargo tonnage: 0.2 (▲ -%)
- Source: AAI

Nanded Airport (IATA: NDC, ICAO: VAND), officially known as Shri Guru Gobind Singh Ji Airport, is a domestic airport serving the city of Nanded, in the state of Maharashtra, India. It was inaugurated on 4 October 2008 by the former Minister of Civil Aviation, Praful Patel, and the then Chief Minister of Maharashtra, Vilasrao Deshmukh, with Kingfisher Airlines flying a special commemorative flight to the airport using its ATR-72 turboprop aircraft. It is named after Guru Gobind Singh, the tenth and the last Sikh Guru.

== History ==
The airport was built in 1958 by the Public Works Department. However, it remained underdeveloped for many years, being served only for a short while by regional carrier Vayudoot in the early 1990s. In April 2000, the Maharashtra Industrial Development Corporation (MIDC) took over the development and maintenance of the airport.

To push development and trade in the Marathwada region, the Maharashtra State Industries Ministry initiated the process of modernisation of airports operated by MIDC in 2006. Tenders were floated to invite private parties to draw out a plan for flight operations, as a result of which, the airport was leased to Reliance Airport Developers, a subsidiary of Reliance Infra that undertakes project management, implementation, and operation of airports, who currently operates the airport.

Air India and TruJet were the only two airlines that operated from the airport to four destinations–Amritsar, Delhi, Mumbai and Hyderabad in 2018, before both of them shutting down operations indefinitely in February 2020, due to the COVID-19 pandemic and TruJet's bankruptcy in February 2022. Since then, the airport remained inoperative for three years, when in July 2023, three airlines, Star Air, Fly91 and TruJet announced plans to connect the airport with new destinations, such as Jalandhar, Bangalore, Jalgaon, Sindhudurg, Pune, Goa and Hyderabad under the UDAN Scheme, by the end of 2023 and the flighs are resumed now .

== Structure ==
While the new terminal building, capable of handling 300 passengers at peak hours, featured six check-in counters, VIP lounges, departure and arrival lounges, transit suites & snooze cabins, visitors' waiting area, and cafeteria, the airside saw drastic improvements as well. The sole runway was extended from 1375 metres to 2300 metres. Runway width was also increased by 15 metres to 45 metres, making it capable of handling larger aircraft such as the Boeing 737 and the Airbus A320. A new night landing system and airfield lighting system were installed along with modern navigational aids.

The Directorate General of Civil Aviation awarded a provisional aerodrome licence to Nanded Airport in the public use category on 5 April 2010, and a permanent licence on 1 October 2010.

Passenger traffic at Nanded Airport in FY 2011 Q2 increased to almost 5,700 per month from 3,000 in the previous quarter.

== Airlines and destinations ==
Until January 2020, Air India and TruJet were the only airlines that operated regular flights to Amritsar, Delhi, Mumbai and Hyderabad under the UDAN Scheme, and then both airlines indefinitely suspended all operations from the airport due to the COVID-19 pandemic. Since February 2020, the airport has not been operational. In July 2023, three airlines, Star Air, FLY91 and TruJet have announced to connect the airport with new destinations, such as Jalandhar, Bangalore, Jalgaon, Sindhudurg, Pune, Goa and Hyderabad under the UDAN Scheme, by the end of 2023. On 31 March 2024, Star Air restarted commercial operations in the airport, by starting direct flights from the airport to five new destinations.

| Airlines | Destinations |
|---|---|
| Star Air | Ahmedabad, Bengaluru, Ghaziabad, Goa–Mopa, Hyderabad, Mumbai, Nagpur, Pune |

== See also ==
- Reliance Infrastructure
- Latur Airport
- Baramati Airport
- Osmanabad Airport
- Yavatmal airport
