= Reliance Natural Resources Limited =

Reliance Natural Resources
- Company type: Public company
- Traded as: BSE: 532709; NSE: RNRL
- Industry: Petrochemical
- Founded: 2000
- Headquarters: Mumbai, Maharashtra
- Area served: India
- Key people: Anil Ambani (Chairman)
- Revenue: ₹4.85 billion (US$51 million) (2011)
- Parent: Reliance Anil Dhirubhai Ambani Group
- Subsidiaries: Reliance Fuel Resources Limited, Reliance Natural Resources (Singapore) Pte Ltd, Reliance Cementation Private Limited.
- Website: www.rnrl.in

Reliance Natural Resources Limited is an Indian energy company involved in sourcing, supply and transportation of gas, coal and liquid fuels. The company was incorporated on 24 March 2000 and went public on 25 July 2005. It is a part of the Reliance Anil Dhirubhai Ambani Group. Reliance Natural Resources has merged with Reliance Power.
