= Sant Gadge Baba Yavatmal Airport =

Airport in Yavatmal, India

Sant Gadge Baba Yavatmal Airport (Historically Jawaharlal Darda Airstrip, Yavatmal)
- IATA: none; ICAO: VA78; LID: VA78

Summary
- Airport type: Public
- Owner: Maharashtra Industrial Development Corporation
- Operator: MIDC
- Serves: Yavatmal
- Location: Yavatmal
- Elevation AMSL: 1,403 ft / 429 m
- Coordinates: 20°23′47″N 078°12′30″E

Map

Runways
Direction	Length		Surface
Direction	ft	m	Surface
08/26	6,923	2,110	Asphalt

Sant Gadge Baba Yavatmal Airport is a public airport located 9 kilometres east of the city of Yavatmal, in the Vidarbha region of Maharashtra, India.

== History ==
Sant Gadge Baba Yavatmal Airport was constructed in 1998 by the Maharashtra Industrial Development Corporation. The airport was largely underused, being used only for government-operated aircraft. With the aim to facilitate increase in air traffic, which in turn, would help boost trade in the region, the Maharashtra State Industries Ministry began the process of modernisation of MIDC airports in 2006. It floated tenders inviting private parties to draw out a plan for airport operations. Reliance Airport Developers Ltd offered the highest bid (Rs. 27 crore) for Latur, Nanded, and Yavatmal. Yavatmal's 113.93 hectare airport premises were leased for 95 years to Reliance Airport Developers Ltd on 30 October 2009. Reliance is keen to set up a facility for recycling aero parts at Sant Gadge Baba Yavatmal Airport.

== Structure ==
Sant Gadge Baba Yavatmal Airport has one asphalt runway, oriented 08/26, 2100+ metres long, and 45 metres wide, an apron measuring 80 by 60 metres and a small terminal building.

== Purpose ==
To accelerate the industrial development in district, the airport was constructed. Apart from this, Sant Gadge Baba Yavatmal Airport was also developed as an alternative to park international aircraft in lieu of the Multi-modal International Cargo Hub and Airport at Nagpur (MIHAN).

== Airlines and destinations ==
One flight departed from Yavatmal City to Nagpur with some passengers.

Currently, there are no civilian operations handled. Only private and government flights can be landed for special purposes.

== See also ==
- Reliance Infrastructure
- Guru Gobind Singhji Airport
- Latur Airport
- Baramati Airport
- Osmanabad Airport
