= Gojubavi =

Village in Maharashtra

- Interactive map of Gojubavi
- Coordinates: 18°13′44.19″N 74°34′15.34″E
- Country: India
- State: Maharashtra
- District: Pune

Area
  - Total: 1,696.98 ha (4,193.3 acres)
- Elevation: 538 m (1,765 ft)

Gojubavi is a village in Pune district in the Indian state of Maharashtra.

== Demographics ==
Gojubavi has a population of 2,108 people. Some 447 houses are there.

== History ==
The village of Gojubavi was part of 'supa paragana' in the 16th century. According to legend, Gojubavi was named after the ancient village woman Gojai, who was from the distinguished family of Mokashi. Gojai gave up her life in the ancient practice of Sati. Sati (Sanskrit: satī, also spelled suttee) is an obsolete Indian funeral custom where a widow immolated herself on her husband's funeral pyre or commit suicide in another fashion shortly after her husband's death. The village was named in her honor.

== Geography and climate ==
Gojubavi is located 10 km from sub-district headquarter Baramati and 100 km from district headquarters Gojubabi is the gram panchayat of Gojubavi village.

It has an average elevation of 538 metres (1,765 ft). It is located in rain shadow and receives only around 400–500 mm of rainfall in the monsoon season. The village receives around 60 centimetres (24 in) of rainfall from June to August each year. The weather is dry and hot in summer, with day temperatures crossing 40 °C (104 °F). Typical winter day temperatures are about 25 °C (77 °F).

== Economy ==
Gojubavi and surrounding areas depend on agriculture. The town hosts a branch of the IDBI Bank.

== Transport ==
Gojubavi connects to major highways via the road network. The village has an airstrip near the Maharashtra Industrial Development Corporation development.

== Demographics ==
The town has a population of approximately 2500 people. Major ethnic groups include the Atolewasti, Kadamvasti, Sawantwadi, Humbevasti, and Jadhav Vasti.

== Education ==
Major schools include The New English School Gojubavi and Jadhav Private English Medium School.
