= Dahanu Thermal Power Station =

Thermal power plant in India

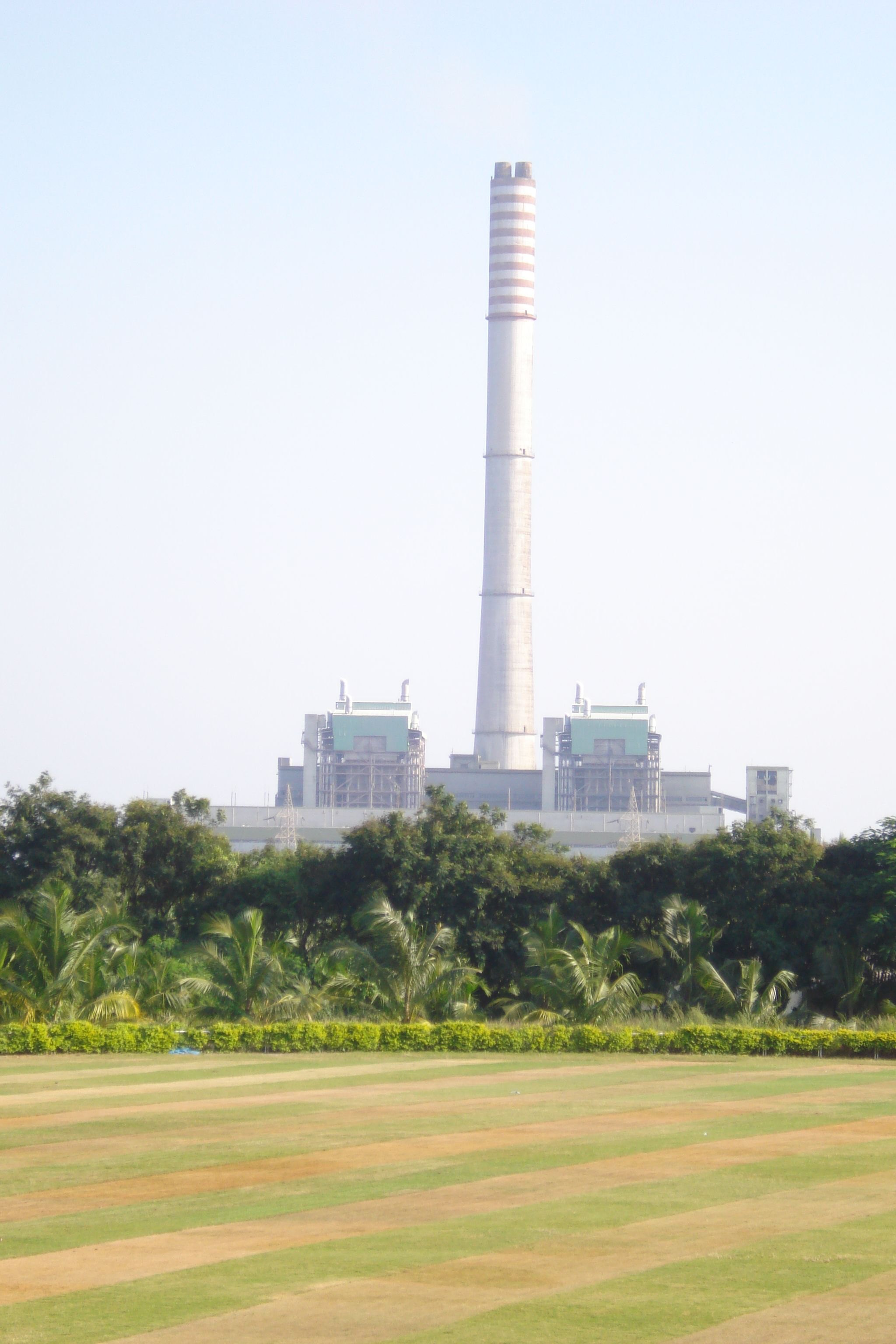
- Country: India
- Location: Dahanu, Palghar district, Maharashtra
- Coordinates: 19°57′17″N 72°44′55″E
- Status: Operational
- Commission date: 1995
- Owner: Adani Group
- Operator: Adani Electricity

Power generation
- Nameplate capacity: 500 MW

Adani Dahanu Thermal Power Station (ADTPS) is a coal based thermal power plant located at coastal Dahanu town in Palghar district in the Indian state of Maharashtra It was constructed by BSES Limited (now Reliance Infrastructure). The power plant operated by Adani Power is located on Mumbai-Ahmedabad rail line and is 120 km away from Mumbai and 20 km away from Mumbai-Ahmedabad-Delhi National Highway 8 (India).

Adani now owns the entire plant, because in August 2018, Reliance Infrastructure sold its Mumbai power business, including the Dahanu Thermal Power Station, to Adani Transmission for ₹18,800 crore to settle debts, Adani Transmission was later renamed to Adani Energy Solutions Limited (AESL), or in short Adani Electricity

== Capacity ==
It has an installed capacity of 500 MW (2x250 MW). The power plant was commissioned in 1995 and is commercially producing power since 1996.

September 2024, Adani Power announced a plan to spend approximately ₹450 crore over the next five years specifically on life extension capital expenditure (capex). on ADTPS (Adani Dahanu Thermal Power Station)

| Unit No. | Capacity | Commissioned on | Status |
|---|---|---|---|
| 1 | 250 MW | 1995 January | Running |
| 2 | 250 MW | 1995 March | Running |
