= Osmanabad Airport =

Airport in Maharashtra, India

Osmanabad Airport Dharashiv Airport
- IATA: none; ICAO: none

Summary
- Airport type: Public
- Owner: Maharashtra Industrial Development Corporation
- Operator: Osmanbad Airport Pvt. Ltd
- Serves: Osmanabad
- Location: Osmanabad, Maharashtra
- Built: Reliance Airport Developers
- Elevation AMSL: 2,260 ft / 689 m
- Coordinates: 18°16′43″N 076°03′12″E

Map

Runways
Direction	Length		Surface
Direction	ft	m	Surface
04/22	3,966	1,200	Asphalt

Osmanabad Airport, officially known as Dharashiv Airport, is a public airport located off NH 211, 10 km north of the town of Osmanabad, in the Marathwada region of Maharashtra, India.

The airfield was built in 1984 and managed by the Public Works Department of the State Government. In 2009, Reliance Airport Developers won a bid to run the airport on a 95-year lease along with four other airports— Nanded, Baramati, Yavatmal and Latur. The airport does not see any air traffic apart from visits from the odd state government aircraft and operations of the flying school based here.

== Structure ==
Osmanabad airport has one runway oriented 04/22, 1,200 metres in length with a 10 metre wide parallel taxiway running along its entire length on the north side. It has an apron measuring 60 metres by 80 metres connected to the southwest end of the runway by means of a taxiway. MIDC has constructed a terminal building next to the apron at a cost of Rs. 89 Lacs. The flying school has a separate apron and hangar on the northern edge of the airfield.

== See also ==
- Reliance Infrastructure
- Guru Gobind Singhji Airport – Nanded
- Latur Airport
- Baramati Airport
- Osmanabad Airport
- Yavatmal airport
