= Reliance Power =

Indian energy company

Reliance Power Limited
- Type: Public
- Traded as: BSE: 532939; NSE: RPOWER
- Industry: Electric utility
- Founded: 17 January 1995; 31 years ago
- Founder: Dhirubhai Ambani
- Headquarters: DAKC, Navi Mumbai, India
- Key people: Anil Ambani (chairman); Neeraj Parakh (CEO & Executive Director)
- Products: Electrical power Natural gas
- Services: Electricity generation and distribution natural gas exploration, production, transportation and distribution
- Revenue: ▲₹8,419.88 crore (US$870 million) (2021)
- Operating income: ▲₹2,977.62 crore (US$310 million) (2021)
- Net income: ▲₹228.63 crore (US$24 million) (2021)
- Total assets: ▼₹50,781.83 crore (US$5.3 billion) (2021)
- Total equity: ▲₹13,813.85 crore (US$1.4 billion) (2021)
- Number of employees: 1300+ (2021)
- Parent: Reliance Group
- Website: reliancepower.co.in

Reliance Power Limited (R-Power), formerly Reliance Energy Generation Limited (REGL) is a part of the Reliance Group. It was established to develop, construct, operate and maintain power projects in the Indian and international markets. Reliance Infrastructure, an Indian private sector power utility company and the Reliance ADA Group promote Reliance Power. The present CEO of Reliance Power is K. Raja Gopal since 2 May 2018.

The company was the sole distributor of electricity to consumers in the suburbs of Mumbai but in 2017 they sold Mumbai operation to Adani Power. It also runs power generation, transmission and distribution businesses in other parts of Maharashtra, Goa and Andhra Pradesh. With its subsidiaries, it is developing 13 medium and large-sized power projects with a combined planned installed capacity of 33,480 MW.

Reliance Natural Resources merged with Reliance Power in 2010, shortly after its initial public offering. As of March 2018, Reliance Power has 50 subsidiaries. In Fortune India 500 list of 2019, R-Power was ranked as the 176th largest corporation in India with 9th rank in 'Power sector' category.

== Overview ==
The company was incorporated on 17 January 1995 as Bawana Power Private Limited and changed its name to Reliance Delhi Power Private Limited in February 1995. Its name was changed to Reliance Energy Generation Limited in March 2004, and finally to Reliance Power Limited in July 2007.

The company website identifies project sites broadly to be located in western India (12,220 MW), northern India (9,080 MW) and northeastern India (4,220 MW) and southern India (4,000 MW). They include six coal-fired projects (14,620 MW) to be fuelled by reserves from captive mines and supplies from India and abroad, two gas-fired projects (10,280 MW) to be fuelled primarily by reserves from the Krishna Godavari basin (the "KG Basin") off the east coast of India, and four hydroelectric projects (3,300 MW), three of them in Arunachal Pradesh and one in Uttarakhand.

== Power generation projects ==
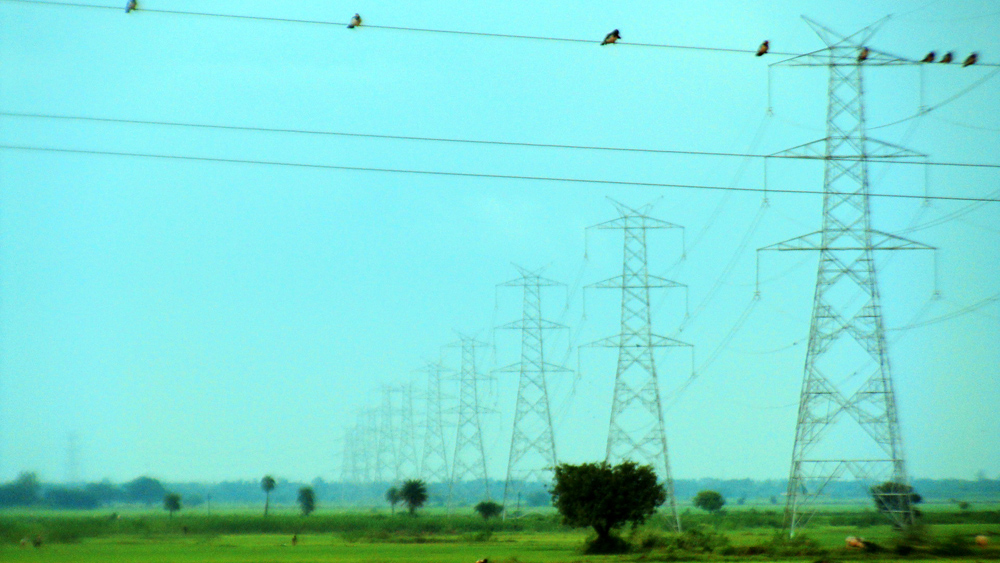
Electricity transmission grid in eastern India.

=== Coal based thermal power projects ===
- Sasan Ultra Mega Power Project, at Sasan village in Singrauli district, Madhya Pradesh – 3,960 MW (6×660 MW). Running with full capacity from March 2015. This is designated as an Ultra mega power projects (UMPP) by the government of India.
- Rosa Thermal Power Project: 1,200 MW (4×300 MW) coal-based thermal power plant in Rosa village, Shahjahanpur district, Uttar Pradesh. The plant is fully functional.
- Butibori Thermal Power Project: 600 MW (2×300 MW), at Butibori near Nagpur, Maharashtra. The plant is no longer in use.

=== Gas based thermal power projects ===
- Samalkot Power Project: 2,400 MW (3 x 800 MW) gas-fired thermal power project at Samalkot in East Godavari district of Andhra Pradesh. This partially implemented project is at a standstill for reasons of financial stress and lack of gas supply. Construction is not complete and whatever capacity has been installed is not being used. In 2018, Reliance power signed an agreement with the government of Bangladesh to "relocate" (or divert?) one unit from Samalkot to that country.

=== Shelved thermal power projects ===
- Tilaiya Ultra Mega Power Project – 4,000 MW at Tilaiya in Jharkhand – Shelved. Reliance Power exited this project in 2015, citing delays in land acquisition. Three years later, in May 2018, it sold all remaining interests in the project to Jharkhand State Power Development Corporation for a sum of ₹112 crores.
- Krishnapatnam Ultra Mega Power Project at Krishnapatnam in Nellore district, Andhra Pradesh – 3,960 MW (6×660 MW) – shelved. Shortly after the project was cleared in 2011, Indonesia changed its coal export policy and the project became unviable. Nevertheless, Reliance took possession of the land. In 2016, Reliance began the process of abandoning the project by seeking an exit deal with the Andhra Pradesh government. There were issues of money and bank guarantees, and the matter went into litigation. In January 2019, the Delhi High Court upheld the invocation of bank guarantees (300 crores) by the government. The project stands shelved.
- Chitrangi Power Project: 3,960 MW (6 x 660 MW) – This coal-based project in Chitrangi in Singhauli district of Madhya Pradesh was canceled and shelved even before the agreement was signed. In 2011, Reliance Power won the tendering process by bidding aggressively a price of only 3.70/unit of electricity. However, it made no movement for several years. Resultantly, environment clearance lapsed in 2016 and was not extended. In March 2018, the Uttar Pradesh Power Corporation, which was the customer for the project, canceled the contract and seized the bank guarantees.
- Dhirubhai Ambani Energy City (DAEC) Dadri Power Project in Uttar Pradesh: 7,480 MW (shelved)

=== Renewable energy ===
There is only one operational Renewable Energy (RE) project. All the rest are pending at various stages; some may have been shelved formally or informally. The projects are:

- Dhirubhai Ambani Solar Park – 40 MW. This is the only operational project.

== Power distribution ==
- BSES Delhi (BSES Rajdhani Power and BSES Yamuna Power)
- BSES Kerala
- BSES Odisha

== Order to Shanghai Electric ==
Anil Dhirubhai Ambani placed a single order for $8.3 billion with Shanghai Electric Group Company (SEC) for buying 36 coal-fired thermal power generation units, spare parts, and related services over a 10-year period.

== Loans from Exim bank ==
Reliance Power Ltd. signed an agreement with the US Export-Import Bank in 2010 for a $5 billion loan to finance power projects. The loan will finance 900 megawatts of renewable technologies such as solar and wind energy, as well as up to 8000 MW of gas-based power generation technology, the Indian company said in a statement. This $5 billion agreement is in addition to the $917 million already approved by the Ex-Im Bank for Reliance Power's coal-fired power plant at Sasan in central India.

The agreement will allow Reliance Power access products and services at competitive rates and help create manufacturing and services jobs in the US. The loan will also enable quicker access to the bank's long-term dollar loans. Reliance Power signed a pact with the US's General Electric Co. (GE) worth ₹100 billion ($2.2 billion) to implement a 2400 MW power plant. The plant will be located in the southern Indian town of Samalkot and the pact was signed during the visit of President Barack Obama.

== Initial public offering and controversies ==
In 2007, Reliance Power issued a red herring stating an intention to go public with an IPO. The proposed IPO was to fund the development of its six power projects across the country whose completion dates are scheduled from December 2009 to March 2014. The Securities and Exchange Board of India, the organisation which regulates activity in the Indian stock market, placed some restrictions based on a complaint about the formulation of the IPO. The complaint also resulted in a public interest litigation being filed against the company. However, the Supreme Court of India passed a ruling that the IPO would go ahead even if any order is passed by any Indian court against the venture.

The IPO opened on 15 January 2008 and attracted $27.5 billion of bids on the first day, equivalent to 10.5 times the stock on offer, thereby creating India's IPO record. The upper cut off price for the bid was ₹ 450 A media report pointed out that, if the company's stock price were to cross ₹650–700, Anil Ambani would go past L. N. Mittal to become the richest Indian. "It is a reflection of world community in the future of India... Investors seem to be confident in the future of Indian economy," Indian Finance Minister, P. Chidambaram told the media about the IPO.

Reliance Power debuted on the stock markets on 11 February 2008. However, the markets were still reeling after the January 2008 stock market volatility, and concerns over speculation that the issue was overpriced sent the stock plummeting soon after its listing. At the end of the first day, the stock traded at a value that was 17 percent lower than its issue price of ₹450. Investors who were betting on the stock reaching 1.5 or even twice its issue price lost a fortune in the process. On 25 February, in an effort to mitigate investor losses, Reliance Power decided to issue 3 bonus shares for every 5 shares held.

== Carbon credits ==
On 2 February 2011, United Nations registered Reliance Power's Sasan Power Plant to be eligible for earning carbon credits followed by Krishnapatanm Ultra Mega Power Project and Tilaiya Ultra Mega Power Projects.

United Nations issues carbon credits to companies that employ advanced technologies in reducing carbon emission.

These carbon credits can then be sold to those companies that are emitting more than their statutory emission.
