= Latur Airport =

Airport in Latur, India

- IATA: LTU; ICAO: VOLT

Summary
- Airport type: Public
- Owner: Maharashtra Industrial Development Corporation
- Operator: Reliance Infrastructure
- Serves: Latur
- Location: Latur, Marathwada, Maharashtra, India
- Elevation AMSL: 2,080 ft / 634 m
- Coordinates: 18°24′42″N 076°27′51″E
- Website: www.laturairport.co.in

Map
- Location of the airport in India LTU (India)

Runways
Direction	Length		Surface
Direction	ft	m	Surface
05/23	7,546	2,300	Asphalt

Latur Airport (IATA: LTU, ICAO: VOLT) is a public airport located near Chincholiraowadi, 12 kilometres (7.5 mi) west of the city of Latur, in the Marathwada region of the Maharashtra state in India.

== History ==
Latur Airport was constructed in 1991 by the Public Works Department (PWD) and then handed over to Maharashtra Industrial Development Corporation in April 2000, During 2006–2008, it was upgraded at a cost of nearly Rs. 140 million, including a longer runway, New terminal building and car park. To push trade in the region, the Maharashtra State Industries Ministry initiated the process of modernisation of airports operated by MIDC in 2006. Tenders were floated to invite private parties to draw out a plan for airport operations. as a result of which, the airport was leased to Reliance Airport Developers (RADPL), part of the Reliance Group that undertakes project management, implementation and operation of airports, who currently operate Latur airport along with Nanded, Baramati, Osmanabad and Yavatmal airports. Kingfisher Airlines commenced flights to Latur from Mumbai via Nanded in October 2008. The service extension to Latur turned seasonal and was stopped when Kingfisher faced financial problems. The Aerodrome is Licensed by the DGCA(Director General of Civil Aviation) in the Public use Category.

== Structure ==
Latur Airport has one asphalt runway, oriented 05/23, 2300 metres long and 30 metres wide. Its 100 by 70-metre apron provides parking space for 1 ATR and 1 Business Jet at a time, while its terminal building can handle 60 passengers during peak hours. Navigational aids at Latur include PAPI lights and an Aerodrome beacon

== See also ==
- Reliance Infrastructure
- Guru Gobind Singhji Airport - Nanded
- Baramati Airport
- Osmanabad Airport
- Yavatmal airport
