= Reliance Health =

Indian health care organisation

- Type: Private
- Industry: Hospitals & Healthcare
- Founded: 2006
- Headquarters: Andheri - West, Mumbai
- Key people: Tina Ambani, Dr. Vikram Chatwal
- Services: 15 'Centres of Excellence', 26 'Departments', 5 Support Groups ICU, NICU, PICU, CCU
- Number of employees: 500+
- Parent: Reliance Group
- Website: kokilabenhospital.com

Reliance Health is a subsidiary organisation of Reliance Group. The organisation looks after the health-care component of the conglomerate. The organisation is headed by the Indian businessman Anil Ambani. It runs two major hospitals and multiple medical centres throughout India.

== Kokilaben Dhirubhai Ambani Hospital, Mumbai ==
The 150 bed multi-speciality hospital underwent a 'soft' launch in early 2008 for employees and doctors who had accepted offers with KDAH, and became operational in the first week of 2009. The project was initiated in 1999 by Dr. Nitu Mandke as a large-scale heart hospital. It had the first 3-room intra-operative MRI suite (IMRIS) in South Asia.

The hospital is named after Kokilaben Ambani, the wife of Dhirubhai Ambani who founded the Reliance group of companies.

== Reliance Hospital, Navi Mumbai ==
Reliance Hospital was inaugurated on 8 July 2018 by the then-Maharashtra CM Devendra Fadnavis. This is the second hospital opened by Reliance ADAG. It is a 9-storey building with 225 beds offering super-speciality services in Oncology, and Pediatrics.
