= Sindhudurg Airport =

Domestic Airport in Maharashtra, India

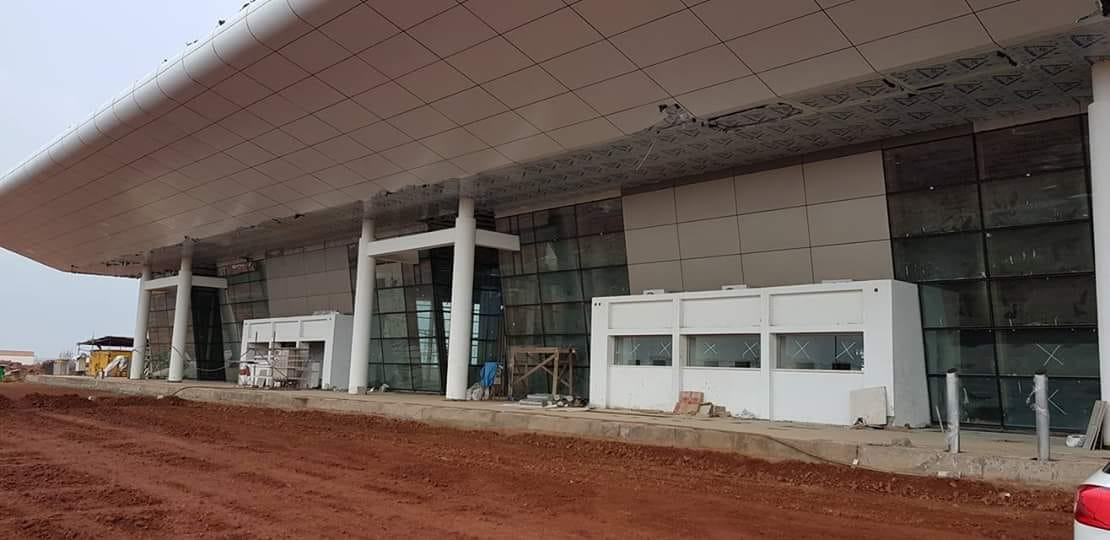
- Sindhudurg Airport entrance under construction
- IATA: SDW; ICAO: VOSR

Summary
- Airport type: Public
- Serves: Sindhudurg
- Location: Chipi-Parule, Vengurla taluka, Sindhudurg district, Maharashtra, India
- Opened: 5 March 2019; 7 years ago
- Elevation AMSL: 62 m (203 ft)
- Coordinates: 16°00′00″N 73°32′00″E

Map
- Location of the airport in Maharashtra SDW (India)

Runways
Direction	Length		Surface
Direction	m	ft	Surface
09/27	2,500	8,202	Asphalt

Statistics (April 2025 - March 2026)
- Passengers: 73,022 (▲398.48%)
- Aircraft movements: 1,566 (▲200%)
- Cargo tonnage: —
- Source: AAI

Sindhudurg Airport (IATA: SDW, ICAO: VOSR), also known as Chipi Airport, is a domestic airport serving the city of Sindhudurg, Maharastra, India. It is located at Chipi-Parule in Vengurla taluka, located 21 km (13 mi) from the nearest city of Malvan and 31 km (19 mi) from Sindhudurg. It has scheduled commercial flights to Mumbai, Bangalore and Hyderabad.

== History ==
IRB Infrastructure won the bid to develop the airport in 2009 for a concession period of 95 years. The project received environmental clearance in March 2012. Work on the airport was completed in the second half of 2013, and was expected to be completed by August 2014, but had been delayed for years because of issues in acquiring private land, among others.

Construction was completed by the second half of 2018 and a test flight from Mumbai landed on 12 September 2018 on the occasion of Ganesh Chaturthi. The airport received its aerodrome licence for commencing commercial operations from the DGCA in September 2021. The airport was subsequently inaugurated on 9 October 2021 and an Alliance Air ATR 72 operated the first flight to Mumbai. Alliance Air was awarded the Sindhudurg-Mumbai route under the UDAN 3.1 of the central government's regional connectivity scheme.

In July 2023, Fly91 was awarded routes to Hyderabad and Bengaluru under Round 5 of the UDAN scheme and commenced operations in March 2024.

== Structure ==
The airport was built by IRB Sindhudurg Airport Pvt. Ltd. on a build–operate–transfer (BOT) basis for the Maharashtra Industrial Development Corporation (MIDC). The airport was initially planned with a 3170 metre long runway at a cost of Rs. 175 crores. It is spread over 275 hectares and the 2500 metre runway can accommodate aircraft like the Airbus A320 and Boeing 737. The airport terminal building can handle 200 departing and 200 arriving passengers during peak hours.

== Airlines and destinations ==
Airlines	Destinations
Fly91	Bengaluru, Hyderabad, Navi Mumbai, Pune

== See also ==
- List of airports in India
- List of airports in Maharashtra
- List of airports in Goa
- Manohar International Airport
- UDAN Scheme
- Tourism in Maharashtra
