= Reliance Infrastructure =

Infrastructure development company based in Mumbai, India

Reliance Infrastructure Limited
- Formerly: Bombay Suburban Electric Supply Limited (1929–1992); BSES Limited (1992–2004); Reliance Energy Limited (2004–2008)
- Type: Public
- Traded as: BSE: 500390; NSE: RELINFRA
- Industry: Construction; Engineering; Utilities (energy)
- Predecessor: Bombay Suburban Electric Supply Limited
- Founded: 1 October 1929; 96 years ago as Bombay Suburban Electric Supply Limited
- Headquarters: DAKC, Navi Mumbai, India
- Key people: Anil Ambani (chairman); Sateesh Seth (Vice-chairman); Punit Narendra Garg (CEO); Pinkesh Rohit Shah (CFO); Paresh Rathod; (Company secretary)
- Products: Electrical power; natural gas; defence; infrastructure; transport
- Services: Electricity generation; natural gas exploration; production; transportation; defence
- Revenue: ▲₹23,999 crore (US$2.5 billion) (2025)
- Operating income: ▲₹8,483 crore (US$880 million) (2025)
- Net income: ▲₹8,490 crore (US$880 million) (2025)
- Total assets: ▲₹65,840 crore (US$6.8 billion) (2025)
- Total equity: ▲₹14,430 crore (US$1.5 billion) (2025)
- Number of employees: 5,400+ (2021)
- Parent: Reliance Group
- Website: www.rinfra.com

Reliance Infrastructure Limited (R-Infra), formerly Reliance Energy Limited (REL) and Bombay Suburban Electric Supply (BSES), is an Indian private sector enterprise involved in power generation, infrastructure, construction and defence. It is part of the Reliance Group. The company is headed by its chairman, Anil Ambani, and chief executive officer, Punit Narendra Garg (since 6 April 2019). The corporate headquarters is in Navi Mumbai. Reliance Infrastructure's interests are in the fields of power plants, metro rail, airports, bridges, toll roads, and defence. It is a major shareholder in the other group company, Reliance Power.

In Fortune India 500 list of 2019, Reliance Infrastructure was ranked as the 51st largest corporation in India with first rank in 'Infrastructure Development' category. As of March 2018, Reliance Infrastructure has 56 subsidiaries, 8 associate companies, and 2 joint-ventures. The EPC Business division of the company in 2018 has bagged various orders, including ₹7,000 crore Versova–Bandra Sea Link project, ₹3,647 crore Uppur Thermal Power Project, ₹1,881 crore National Highway projects from NHAI in Bihar & Jharkhand, ₹1,585 crore Mumbai Metro Line-4 project, ₹1,081 crore Kudankulam Nuclear Power Plant project and others.

== History ==
The predecessor company, Reliance Energy Limited, came into existence when it took over an 83-year-old government undertaking, the Bombay Suburban Electric Supply (BSES) in 2002. BSES was originally founded in October 1929.

In April 2008, Reliance Energy Limited changed its name to Reliance Infrastructure Limited. The company entered the road building industry in 2006 with two National Highway projects in Tamil Nadu (Namakkal-Karur and Dindigul-Samayanallur), both sections of National Highway 44 (formerly NH 7). In 2011, it was announced that the company was planning to buy out licences to build road projects from companies unable to do so.

In September 2018, at a time of financial stress, R-Infra sold its power transmission business in Mumbai to Adani Electricity Mumbai Limited for ₹18,800 crore (equivalent to ₹250 billion or US$2.6 billion in 2023).

In October 2024, Reliance Infrastructure board has approved raising of $350 million (Rs 2,930 crore) through ultra-low cost 10-year maturity unsecured foreign currency convertible bonds (FCCBs). The board also approved the employees stock option scheme (ESOPs), which will provide a grant of up to 26 million equity shares of value of over Rs 850 crore.

== BSES Delhi ==
Till 2002, the Delhi Vidyut Board (DVB) used to supply electricity to NCT of Delhi, except areas of Lutyens and Cantonment which were & are still catered by New Delhi Municipal Council (NDMC) and Military Engineer Services (MES) respectively. The same year in July, DVB was unbundled and was split into 3 distribution companies namely, BSES Rajdhani Power Limited (BRPL), BSES Yamuna Power Limited (BYPL) & Tata Power Delhi Distribution Limited (TPDDL). Both BRPL and BYPL are 51:49% joint venture between Reliance Infrastructure and Government of Delhi. Since then, BRPL supplies electricity to South & West Delhi covering an area of 750 sq. km. Similarly, BYPL supplies electricity to Central & East Delhi covering an area of around 200 km^{2}.

== Transportation ==
=== Airports ===
Reliance Infrastructure with its subsidiary company, Reliance Airport Developers Limited (RADL) operated five minor brownfield airports in various small towns of Maharashtra, viz. Nanded Airport, Latur Airport, Baramati Airport, Yavatmal Airport, and Osmanabad Airport. In March 2015, the Government of Maharashtra was looking at cancelling the agreements and taking back control of the airports due to slow progress.

In March 2019, the company received a contract from the Airports Authority of India (AAI) worth ₹ 648 crores (USD 92 million) for the construction of Rajkot Greenfield Airport at Hirasar in Rajkot district of Gujarat state.

=== Metro projects ===
- Line-1 of Phase-1 of Mumbai Metro: One of the three metro lines in this phase was awarded to a consortium led by R-Infra. The other two lines were awarded to other parties. Mumbai Metro One Pvt Ltd, which is a consortium of R-Infra, Veolia Transport, and Mumbai Metropolitan Region Development Authority (MMRDA) secured the contract for the ₹23.56 billion (US$240 million) Versova-Andheri-Ghatkopar section. Mumbai Metro I is operational. The project will be implemented on a Build-Operate-Transfer basis, where the consortium will collect revenue for 35 years and then hand over the infrastructure to the government.
- Line 4 of Phase 2 of Mumbai Metro: The contracts for three "packages" (18 stations) have been awarded to a consortium led by R-Infra, but apparently, the contract does not include the laying of any tracks. The total length of Line-4 is 32.32 km (20.08 mi) with 32 stations, and the line will connect Wadala to Kasarvadavali via Ghatkopar and Mulund. Out of this, the contract for constructing three "packages" (18 stations) has been awarded to the "Reliance-Astaldi Joint Venture." Construction began in June 2018 and is expected to be completed by 2021.
- Airport Express (Orange Line): The Airport Express line of Delhi Metro connecting New Delhi railway station to Dwarka Sector-21 metro station, through the Indira Gandhi International Airport. It was opened to the public on 23 February 2011. It has 6 stations covering a length of 22.7 km. All six metro stations on the Orange line are called City Airport Terminals (CATs).

=== Toll roads ===
Reliance Infrastructure is the largest concessionaire of the National Highways Authority of India (NHAI), having received as many as eleven contracts to build roads under the NHDP Phase-V. These eleven contracts involve constructing about 1,000 km of highway and expressway projects worth ₹120 billion (US$1.2 billion). All the projects are on Build–Operate–Transfer scheme of funding, where R-Infra is required to raise all its own funds and gets to collect tolls on the road for a period of thirty years. Three of the projects (all in Tamil Nadu) are already operational. The eleven projects are:

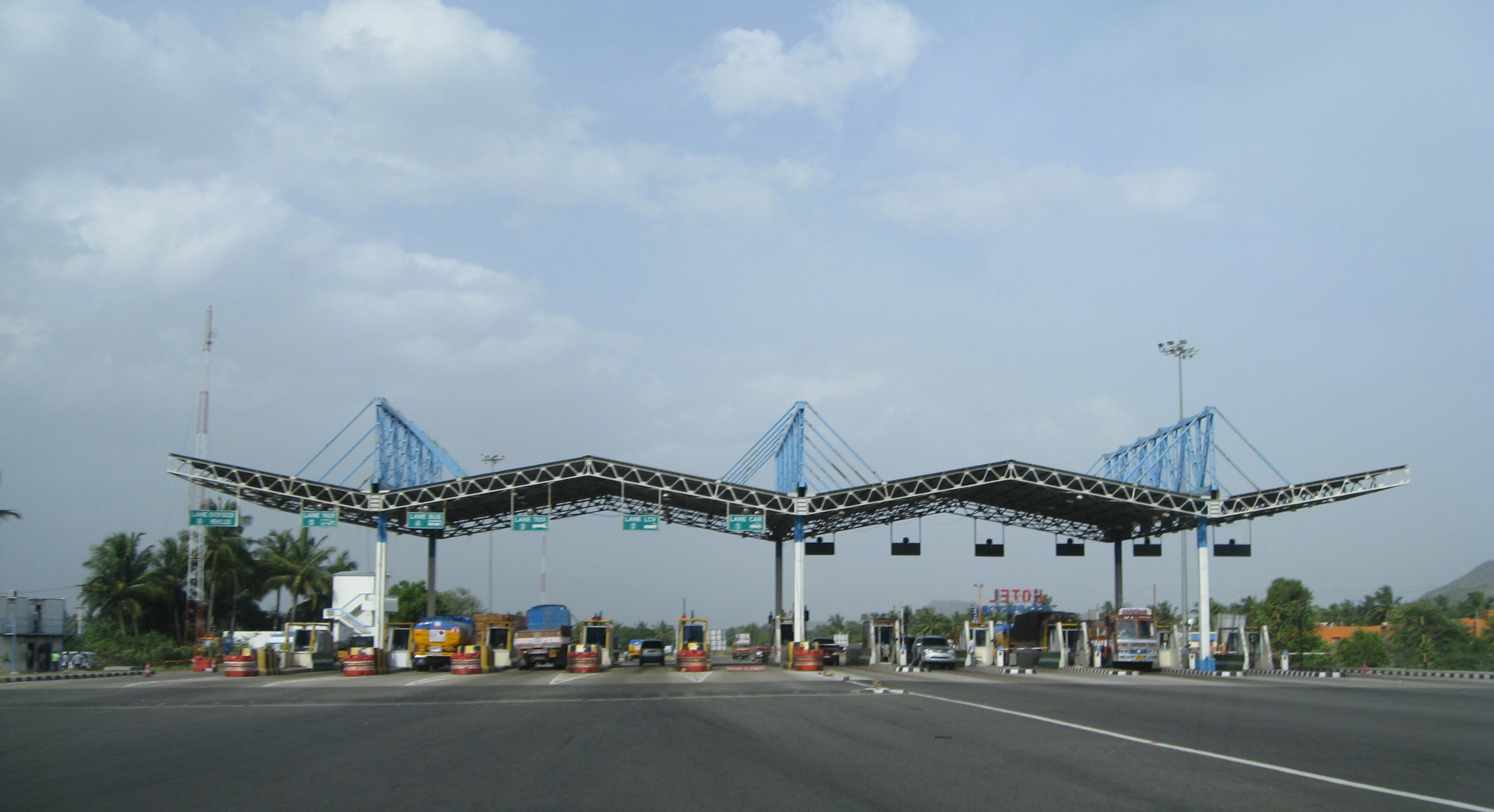
Toll Plaza on NK Toll Road

- DA Toll Road (180 km six-lane between Delhi and Agra on NH-2 in the state of Haryana and Uttar Pradesh)
- PS Toll Road (140 km six-lane road connecting Pune and Satara in Maharashtra on NH-4)
- HK Toll Road (60 km six-lane connecting Hosur and Krishnagiri in Tamil Nadu on NH-7)
- DS Toll Road (53 km four-lane connecting Dindigul with Samayanallur in Tamil Nadu on NH-7)
- NK Toll Road (43 km four-lane connecting Namakkal and Karur in Tamil Nadu on NH-7)
- KM Toll Road (71 km four/ six-lane connecting Kandla and Mundra ports in Gujarat on NH-8A)
- JR Toll Road (52 km four/ six-lane connecting Jaipur and Reengus in Rajasthan on NH-11)
- TD Toll Road (87 km four-lane connecting Trichy and Dindigul in Tamil Nadu on NH-45)
- TK Toll Road (82 km four-lane connecting Trichy and Karur in Tamil Nadu on NH-67)
- SU Toll Road (136 km four-lane road connecting Salem with Ulundurpet in Tamil Nadu on NH-68)
- GF Toll Road (four-lane connecting Gurgaon–Faridabad (33.1 km) and Ballabgarh–Sohna (33.9 km) for State Highway in Haryana)

=== Bridges ===
Reliance Infrastructure and Hyundai Engineering formed a joint venture to build the Worli-Haji Ali Sea Link, part of the Western Freeway. The consortium was also to toll the Bandra Worli Sea Link for 40 years. In early 2012, the Municipal Corporation of Greater Mumbai proposed constructing a 35 km coastal road between Nariman Point and Kandivali.

Reliance protested against this project as it claimed it would incur losses. Subsequently, the Government of Maharashtra appointed a committee to look into the matter. Later, it was reported that the MSRDC was likely to cancel the deal with Reliance due to the latter not having started construction two years after signing the agreement. Afterwards, it was announced that the deal was canceled as the mediation report stated that it was impossible to build.

== Power projects ==
=== EPC contracts ===
Projects where the Engineering-Procurement-Construction (EPC) contract was awarded to Reliance Infrastructure Limited:

- 3,960 MW Sasan Ultra Mega Power Project: (6×660 MW) at Sasan village in Singrauli district, Madhya Pradesh. This is designated as an UMPP by the Government of India.
- 2,400 MW Samalkot Thermal Power Project: (3×800 MW) gas-fired thermal power project at Samalkot in East Godavari district of Andhra Pradesh.
- 1,200 MW Rosa Thermal Power Project: (4×300 MW) coal-based thermal power plant in Rosa village, Shahjahanpur district, Uttar Pradesh. The plant is fully functional.
- 1,200 MW Raghunathpur Thermal Power Project: (2×600 MW) power project in West Bengal. The plant is owned by Damodar Valley Corporation.
- 1,200 MW Rajiv Gandhi Thermal Power Project: (2×600 MW) located near Barwala in Hisar district, Haryana. The plant is owned by Haryana Power Generation Corporation.
- 600 MW Deenbandhu Chhotu Ram Thermal Power Project: (2×300 MW) in Yamunanagar district of Haryana. The plant is owned by Haryana Power Generation Corporation.
- 600 MW Butibori Thermal Power Project: (2×300 MW), at Butibori near Nagpur, Maharashtra. The plant is not functional.
- 500 MW Dahanu Thermal Power Project: (2×250 MW) coal based power plant located at coastal Dahanu town in Palghar district in Maharashtra.

=== BoP contracts ===
Projects where the Balance of Plant (BoP) contract was awarded to Reliance Infrastructure Limited:

- Unit (5 & 6) of Parichha Thermal Power Project: located at Parichha near Jhansi in Uttar Pradesh, the plant is owned by Uttar Pradesh Rajya Vidyut Utpadan Nigam.
- Unit (7 & 8) of Panipat Thermal Power Project – II: (2×250 MW) located at Panipat. The plant is owned by Haryana Power Generation Corporation Limited (HPGCL).

== Defence ==
- Reliance Defence Limited (RDL), established on 28 March 2015 as a subsidiary of Reliance Infrastructure has 11 subsidiaries in niche segments of the defence sector. RDL has organized the structure into defence, marine, and land systems with a focused approach towards aiming capabilities and developing in-house expertise in Land-based weapon platforms and systems, Air Combat vehicles, aircraft and avionics, Missiles, Unmanned systems, and C4ISR systems, Surface & sub-surface shipbuilding and development. R-Infra acquired Pipavav Defence and Offshore Engineering Company Limited in Gujarat.

=== Aerospace ===
- Dhirubhai Ambani Aerospace Park spread over 400 acres land at MIHAN in Nagpur, planned with an aim to create a comprehensive eco-structure through backward integration under the Government of India's Make in India program for indigenous manufacturing of aerospace components. This aerospace park, first of its kind in India, comprising a cluster of manufacturers will indigenously deliver major aircraft components, spares and avionics requirements of the aerospace industry.
- 18 June 2025: It was announced during the Paris Air Show that Dassault Aviation of France will manufacture Dassault Falcon 2000LXS business jet in Indian in partnership with Reliance Infrastructure Ltd subsidiary, Reliance Aerostructure Limited (RAL). The joint venture, Dassault Reliance Aerospace Ltd (DRAL) would become the first Center of Excellence (CoE) for Falcon series, including Falcon 6X and Falcon 8X programs out of France. The agreement will be followed by transferring the full fuselage and wing assembly operations and major facility upgrades of the DRAL facility at MIHAN at Nagpur airport, Maharashtra. The first flight of first Indian Falcon 2000 is expected by 2028. The facility was established in 2017, operations began later that year with the setting up of a state-of-the-art manufacturing facility at MIHAN, the first Falcon 2000 front section was delivered in 2019. By 2025, 100 major components are sourced from the facility.
- 30 June 2025: Reliance Defence announced a strategic partnership with United States Department of Defense-authorised firm, Coastal Mechanics Inc. (CMI) to jointly tap into India's defence aircraft maintenance sector. The collaboration will include MRO, upgrades and lifecycle support services to multiple platforms of the Indian Armed Forces including SEPECAT Jaguar, Mikoyan MiG-29, Boeing AH-64 Apache, Bofors 40 mm L/70 among other legacy systems. The companies would also set up a joint venture at MIHAN at Nagpur airport.
- 5 September 2025: Reuters reported that the company will sell 2% of its share in Dassault Reliance Aerospace Ltd (DRAL) to Dassault Aviation. The transaction, worth ₹1.76 billion (US$18 million), will give up the majority stake of the joint venture to the latter. The deal is expected to be closed by 1 November.

=== Large-calibre ammunition ===
- 22 May 2025: Reliance Defence announced a strategic partnership with Germany's Rheinmetall in the field of ammunition, where Reliance would supply explosives and propellants for medium- and heavy-calibre ammunition from a new greenfield manufacturing facility in Watad Industrial Area of Ratnagiri, Maharashtra, which is a part of Dhirubhai Ambani Defence City. The companies would also engaged in joint marketing activities for selected products. The partnership could also expand in future as per requirement. The new Reliance facility, meant to be one of the largest of its kind in South Asia, will produce 2,00,000 artillery shells, 10,000 tons of explosives and 2,000 tons of propellants.
- 9 June 2025: Reliance Infrastructure became India's first private sector company to design and develop four categories of a next generation 155 mm artillery ammunition, under Development cum Production Partner (DcPP) model with Armament Research and Development Establishment (ARDE) of the Defence Research and Development Organisation (DRDO). With the four projects being completed, ten companies had been integrated into the supply chain and production could be initiated immediately.
- 10 June 2025: Reliance Defence announced another strategic cooperation agreement with Germany’s Diehl Defence. The agreement, worth ₹10,000 crore (US$1.0 billion), for the local production of Vulcano 155 mm precision-guided artillery shell. The Vulcano offers longer range and higher precision than standard artillery shells with GPS and laser guidance. Reliance Defence will serve as the prime contractor, leading the manufacturing efforts, while Diehl Defence will supply the core technology and provide system-level expertise. The shells are to be produced at a new greenfield manufacturing facility in Watad Industrial Area of Ratnagiri, Maharashtra.
- 26 June 2025: The company received an export order worth ₹600 crore (US$62 million) from Rheinmetall Waffe Munition GmbH. The contract is a part of the larger strategic partnership with the German defence major Rheinmetall.

== Subsidiaries ==
As of March 2020, Reliance Infrastructure Limited has 58 subsidiaries including Reliance Defence, Dassault Reliance Aerospace, BSES Rajdhani Power, BSES Yamuna Power, BSES Kerala Power, Reliance Airport Developers, Mumbai Metro One, Reliance Sealink One, Delhi Airport Metro Express, Reliance Smart Cities, Thales Reliance Defence Systems, Reliance Power Transmission, Reliance Aerostructure and Reliance Helicopters.

== See also ==
- Solar power in India
