= Rosa Thermal Power Plant =

Power plant in India

- Country: India
- Location: Rosa village, Shahjahanpur, Uttar Pradesh
- Coordinates: 27.8186°N 79.9374°E
- Status: Operational
- Construction began: 2007
- Commission date: 2009
- Owner: Reliance Power
- Operator: Rosa Power Supply Company Limited

Thermal power station
- Primary fuel: Coal

Power generation
- Units operational: 4 × 300 MW
- Nameplate capacity: 1,200 MW

Rosa Power Plant is a 1,200 MW capacity, coal based Thermal power plant at Rosa village near Shahjahanpur in Uttar Pradesh, India. Yes Bank Limited acquired 29.97% stake in 2020 because of dues on Reliance Power. Reliance Power Limited have now 70.03% of stake in Rosa Power Supply Company Limited.

== Description ==
The power plant is being developed in two stages, with the first stage (Rosa Phase I) already having become commercially operational on 12 March 2010. It is also the first project of the company to become operational.

Rosa Power Supply Company Limited (RPSCL), the holding company of Rosa Power Plant, was incorporated on 1 September 1994 as a subsidiary of Aditya Birla Power Company. It was later transferred to Reliance Power on 1 November 2006 and is now a fully owned subsidiary of Reliance Power. It is a project that has received a considerable support from the Uttar Pradesh government with it being designated a 'priority project'. The entire power generated will be sold to the Uttar Pradesh Power Corporation Limited (UPPCL). The tariff for the power generated by the plant will be determined in accordance with the guidelines for tariff as set by Uttar Pradesh Electricity Regulatory Commission.

The construction for the Phase I of the project began in June 2007 and by December 2009 the first unit of the project had started generating power. The Boiler, Turbine and Generator (BTG) which are the main equipments for the plant were supplied by Shanghai Electric Corporation, China.

The project uses coal as the primary fuel. The coal for the project would be supplied from the Ashoka Coal mines of Central Coalfields Limited, a subsidiary of Coal India Limited. The coal mines are located in Jharkhand and the coal will be transported by Railways over a distance of 870 km.

The power generated from the plant will be evacuated using the UP state's transmission network.

The water required for the power plant is sourced from Garrah river located a kilometer from the project

The Phase I of the project entailed an investment of almost Rs. 3,000 Crore which was funded with a debt equity ratio of 70:30.

The entire 600 MW plant is being run and managed by employee strength of 100 led by management.

== Operations ==
There are four functioning units, all of which are coal-fired thermal power stations. The machinery for all the units are from Shanghai Electric Corporation. The last unit of 300 MW was commissioned in April 2012.

== Capacity ==
Rosa Thermal Power Station has a capacity of 1,200 MW (4x300 MW).

Stage	Capacity (MW)	Date of Commissioning	Status
1	300	2009, December	Running
1	300	2010 March	Running
2	300	2011 December	Running
2	300	2012 March	Running
