= Shiroli, Kolhapur =

Village in Maharashtra

Shiroli
- Village, Industrial Estate
- Interactive map of Shiroli
- Country: India
- State: Maharashtra
- District: kolhapur

Government
  - Type: Panchayati raj (India)
  - Body: Gram panchayat

Languages
  - Official: Marathi
- Time zone: UTC+5:30 (IST)
- Telephone code: 91 230
- ISO 3166 code: IN-MH
- Nearest city: Kolhapur

Shiroli is a village and industrial estate in Kolhapur district in the state of Maharashtra, India.
