= Trans Thane Creek =

Trans Thane Creek, also popularly called TTC, is a creek running between Thane and Navi Mumbai. It is popularly known as Thane- Belapur Road. It is a huge industrial area near Mumbai. The nearest hill stations are Matheran and Karjat.

About 2500 hectares of the TTC-MIDC industrial zone, known as Thane-Belapur industrial belt, are likely to be affected due to the government policy to convert industrial units to residential plots.
