= Reliance Group =

Indian conglomerate company

- Type: Private
- Industry: Conglomerate
- Predecessor: Carved out from Reliance Industries
- Founded: 10 July 2006; 20 years ago
- Founder: Anil Ambani
- Headquarters: Reliance Centre, Santacruz (East), Mumbai, India
- Key people: Anil Ambani (chair, MD) & Tina Munim Ambani (non executive director)
- Products: Financial services, construction, entertainment, power, health care, aviation, defense
- Owner: Anil Ambani (55.54%)
- Subsidiaries: Reliance Entertainment; Reliance Infrastructure; Reliance Power; Reliance Health; Reliance MediaWorks
- Website: www.reliancegroupindia.com

Reliance Group is an Indian conglomerate, headquartered in Mumbai, India. The company, which was formed after Dhirubhai Ambani's business was divided up, is headed by his younger son Anil Ambani. Reliance Group has four listed companies, Reliance Power, Reliance Infrastructure, Reliance Home Finance and Reliance Communications. The group provides financial services, construction, entertainment, power, health care, manufacturing, defence, aviation, and transportation services.

== History ==
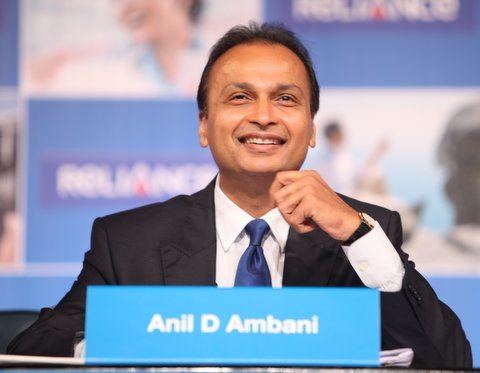
Founder and Chairman: Anil Ambani

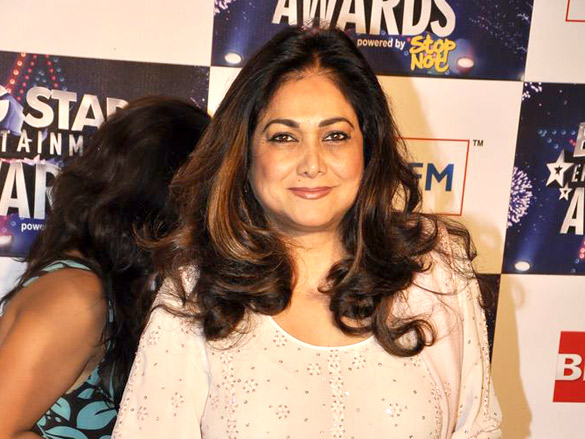
Chairperson: Tina Ambani

Reliance Commercial Corporation was founded by Dhirubhai Ambani in 1966 as a polyester firm. It was renamed to Reliance Industries on 8 May 1973. Reliance later entered into financial services, petroleum refining, and power sector. By 2002, Reliance had grown into a U$15 billion conglomerate. After the death of Dhirubhai Ambani on 6 July 2002, Reliance was headed by his two sons. The Reliance ADA Group was formed in 2006 after the two brothers Mukesh Ambani and Anil Ambani, split Reliance Industries in December 2005. Anil Ambani got the responsibility of Reliance Infocomm, Reliance Energy, and Reliance Capital. Reliance Group entered the power sector through Reliance Power, and the entertainment sector by acquiring Adlabs. In October 2010, Reliance power placed the world's largest order worth $8.29 billion to Shanghai Electric Group to supply power equipment based on Supercritical steam generator technology. On 28 October 2017, the group launched construction of a defense production unit in Mihan-SEZ region. The unit will be part of a joint venture between Reliance Group, led by Anil Ambani, and its JV partner French major Dassault Aviation. The production at Mihan-SEZ will begin with components for the Rafale warplanes and Falcon business jet produced by Dassault. It is expected to fully assemble both the aircraft in the Nagpur unit in the coming years.

In March 2022, Anil Ambani stepped down from the boards of Reliance Infrastructure and Reliance Power.

In August 2024, SEBI banned Anil Ambani from the securities market for five years on charges of diversion of funds.

== Major acquisitions ==
Date	Firm (24July2025) acquired	Renamed firm
May 2000	BSES	Reliance Infrastructure
Oct 2003	FLAG Telecom, 207Mn$	Reliance Globalcom
July 2005	Metro Adlabs (51% stake), 74Mn$	Reliance Entertainment
Apr 2008	Lowry Digital USA, 7.5Mn$	Reliance Big Entertainment
May 2008	Vanco	Reliance Globalcom
Apr 2010	Codemasters UK (50% stake)	Zapak
Sept 2011	Bloomberg UTV (66% stake)	Reliance Capital
Mar 2015	Pipavav Shipyard	Reliance Infrastructure
Oct 2015	MTS India	Reliance Communication

== See also ==
- List of companies of India
- List of largest companies by revenue
- List of public corporations by market capitalization
- Make in India
