= List of airports in Goa =

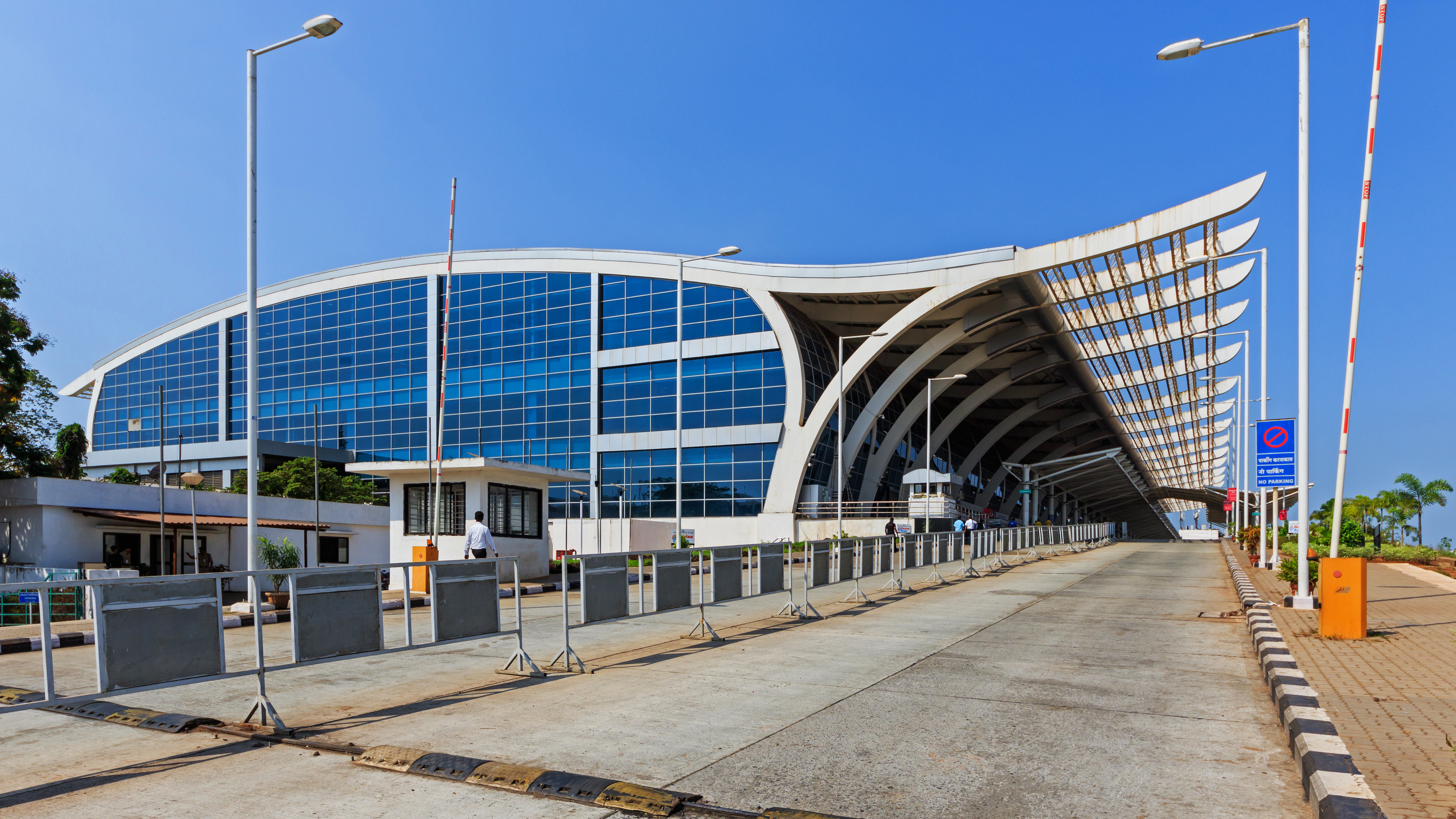
Dabolim Airport

Goa is a small Indian state in western India bordering Karnataka and Maharashtra. Goa has 2 operational airports. Dabolim Airport at Dabolim, and Manohar International Airport at Mopa.

The Dabolim Airport is an international airport which was built in 1955 and is currently owned by the Government of Goa and Indian Navy and operated by Airports Authority of India. A new terminal at Dabolim Airport was inaugurated on 3 December 2013. The current airport has regular and charter flights to a few Middle Eastern countries, Russia, and the United Kingdom. However, due to the Dabolim Airport being a civilian as well as a military airport, airside congestion was a significant problem as the airport has only one runway.

Therefore, a new airport at Mopa was proposed. The foundation stone for the Mopa Airport was laid by Prime Minister Narendra Modi in November 2016. Mopa Airport, owned and operated by the GMR Group is being built in an area of 2,133 acres (863 ha) at a cost of approximately ₹2,650 crores (US$330 million).

On 11 December 2022, Mopa Airport was inaugurated by Prime Minister Narendra Modi and Mopa Airport was christened as Manohar International Airport named after late Chief Minister of Goa Manohar Parrikar. Flight operations from Manohar International Airport, Mopa have commenced from 5 January 2023.

== List ==
The list includes the airports in the Indian state of Goa with their respective ICAO and IATA codes.

List of airports in Goa
| Sl. no. | Location in Goa | Airport name | ICAO | IATA | Operator | Category | Role |
|---|---|---|---|---|---|---|---|
| 1 | Dabolim | Dabolim Airport | VOGO | GOI | Airports Authority of India and Indian Navy | International airport | Commercial/Military |
| 2 | Mopa | Manohar International Airport | VOGA | GOX | GMR Group | International airport | Commercial |
