= Wagle Estate =

Industrial area of the city of Thane

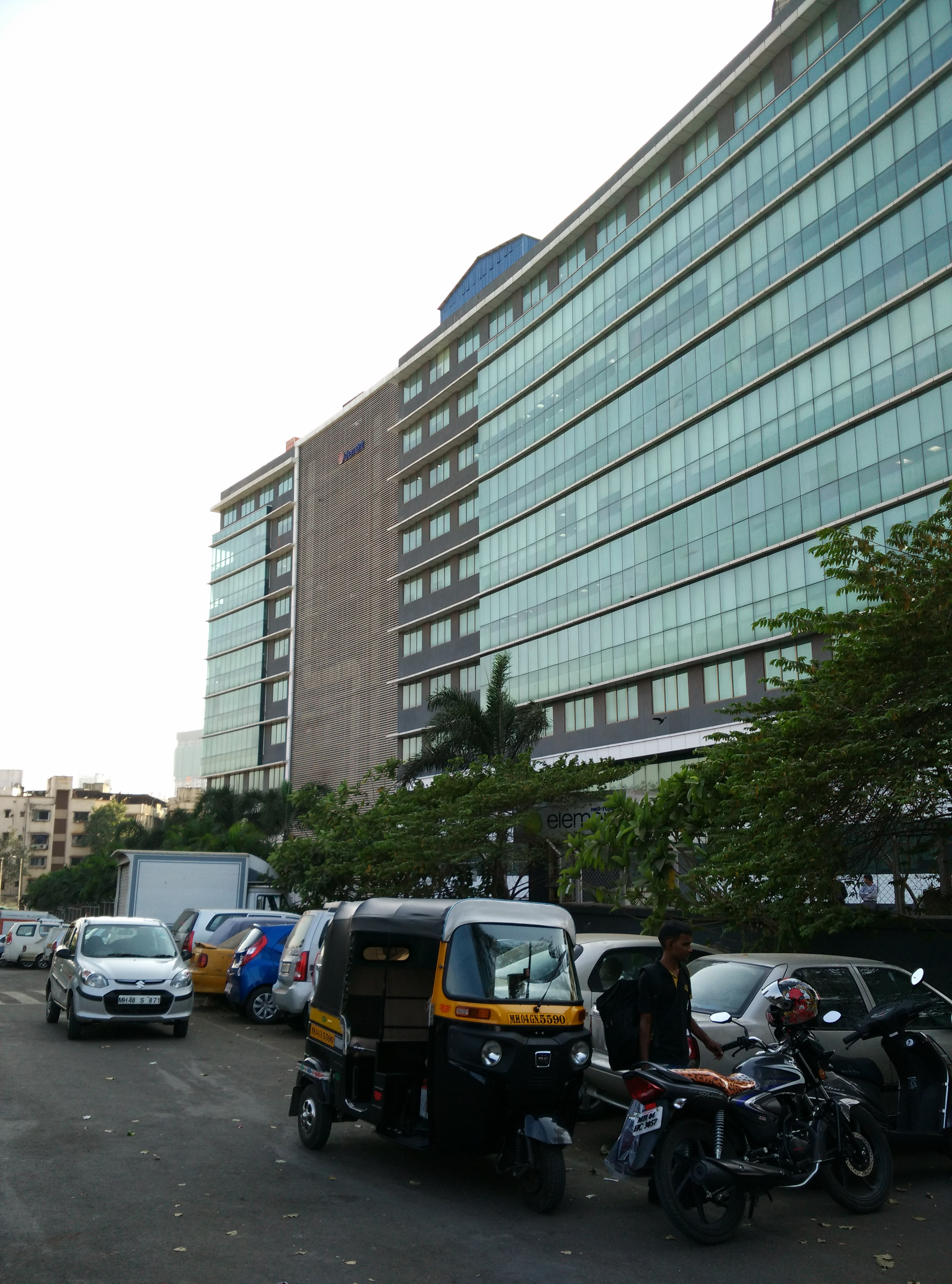
"Neptune Element", a commercial complex in Wagle Estate

The Wagle Estate is the industrial area of Thane city established in 1962. Additionally, it's Maharashtra first MIDC.

== History ==
After the formation of Maharashtra state, the government of Maharashtra constituted a "Board of Industrial Development" (BID) on 1 October 1960, under the chairmanship of Shri. S. G. Barve. The committees recommendations received in the industries department were taken up for implementation. As per the Borkar Committee's recommendations, development of Ulhas Valley Water Supply was entrusted to the Board of Industrial Development (BID). The BID framed the legislation; it was introduced before the state legislation and passed in the form of "Maharashtra Industrial Act" which gave birth to Maharashtra Industrial Development Corporation (MIDC), as a separate corporation on 1 August 1962.

== Government offices ==
- Mahanagar Telephone Nigam Limited (MTNL)
- Passport Office catering to districts like Nasik district, Nandurbar district, Jalgaon district, Dhule district, Thane district and Raigad district.
- Passport Office catering to city like Navi Mumbai.
- Passport Seva Kendra Thane.
- Thane Municipal Transport (TMT).
- Election Commission of India Office
