= Rajewadi railway station =

Railway station in India

General information
- Location: Malshiras Road, Rajewadi, Pune; India
- Coordinates: 18.2872°N 74.1717°E
- Elevation: 727 metres (2,385 ft)
- System: Indian Railways station
- Owner: Indian Railways
- Line: Pune–Miraj–Londa line
- Platforms: 2
- Tracks: 4
- Connections: Auto stand

Construction
- Parking: No
- Cycle facilities: No

Other information
- Station code: RJW
- Fare zone: Central Railway
Location
- Location within India Location within Maharashtra

Rajewadi railway station is a small station in the Pune district of Maharashtra, India. Its code is RJW. It serves Rajewadi, on the Pune–Bangalore railway line which can serve as connection to proposed Chhatrapati Sambhaji Raje International Airport. An approach road will be constructed to the airport from the city but the decision for connection with rapid transit systems is yet to be finalized.

The station has a single platform and lacks basic facilities such as water and sanitation.

== Trains serving the station ==
- Pune Satara Passenger
- Kolhapur–Pune Passenger
