= New Pune Airport =

Airport to serve Pune, Maharashtra, India

Chhatrapati Sambhaji Raje International Airport
- IATA: none; ICAO: none

Summary
- Airport type: Public
- Owner: City and Industrial Development Corporation
- Operator: Maharashtra Airport Development Company
- Serves: Pune Metropolitan Region
- Location: Purandar, Pune district, Maharashtra, India
- Elevation AMSL: 2,277 ft (694 m)
- Coordinates: 18°20′56″N 074°08′02″E

Map
- Location of airport in India Chhatrapati Sambhaji Raje International Airport (India)

Runways
Direction	Length		Surface
Direction	m	ft	Surface
Runway 1 (North)	4,000	13,123	Asphalt
Runway 2 (South)	4,000	13,123	Asphalt

Pune International Airport (or Chhatrapati Sambhaji Raje International Airport) is a proposed greenfield airport project to serve the city of Pune, India. It will be built near Pune city in Pune District in the Indian state of Maharashtra. In 2016, it was announced that the proposed airport would be spread over 2,832 hectares. The airport would be named after Sambhaji Maharaj, a king of the Maratha Empire, who was born at Purandar fort.

The CIDCO will hold a 51 percent stake in the SPV, while MADC's stake will be around 19 percent. The remaining 30 percent will be divided between the Maharashtra Industrial Development Corporation (MIDC) and Pune Metropolitan Region Development Authority (PMRDA). The Airports Authority of India conducted surveys on various areas near Pune for a new airport for the city. Initially, a site near Chakan was chosen for the airport but due to opposition from local farmers and the mountainous terrain, the government decided to build the new airport in Purandar taluka, which has comparatively flatter terrain. The airport is planned to include a dedicated cargo terminal.

== Background ==
Lohagaon Air Force Station serves as the main passenger airport for the city of Pune. Due to its status as a "restricted international airport," only two to four international flights may operate from there. As an air force base it has only a single civil terminal that operates both international and domestic traffic.

Almost 65 to 70 flights currently operate, connecting the area major domestic destinations. This has caused crowding at the existing airport and has led to flight delays as the airport has only eight parking bays. Of those, one is used for VIP traffic and another is used for charter operations. The remaining parking bays are used for international as well as domestic flights. This has led to the need for a dedicated international airport for the city, as Pune is one of the fastest-growing cities in India and is included in the Smart City program of the Indian government. The existing airport will be expanded with a second terminal while the new airport is being constructed.

== Connection ==
The project site is located near the villages of Ambodi, Sonori, Kumbharvalan, Ekhatpur-Munjawadi, Khanwadi, Pargaon Memane, Rajewadi, Aamble, Tekwadi, Vanpuri, Udachiwadi, and Singapur. Rajewadi railway station on the Pune–Miraj–Lonand line is also located near the site. The proposed airport will be connected by six different routes including national highways 48 and 65. There will also be a special ring-road connecting major industrial establishments from Hadapsar with the proposed airport. The Pune Metro also plans to connect to the airport, along with the old Lohagaon airport. A 10km twin-tunnel for cars and trains is also proposed to connect the airport.

== Proposed Airport Structure ==
The new Pune International Airport will serve as a cargo hub for the state. Many nearby farmers cultivate fruits such as grapes and pomegranates, among other crops. With the new airport, their crops can be transported to other states and countries globally. This cargo hub is expected to increase state revenue as exports can be easily processed as well as create new job opportunities.

== Project timeline ==
- July 2002: The central government approved the building of an international airport near Chakan.
- February 2009: The Maharashtra government approved a seed capital of Rs.200 crore for the airport near Chakan. The proposed airport was to be developed on 3,300 ha of which the airport was to use 1,500 ha with two airstrips. The project was set to involve seven villages in the region: Chandoos, Shirol, Waki, Budruk, Koregaon Budruk, Kiwle, Pimpri Thakur and Wadgaon. The Maharashtra Airport Development Company (MADC) was tasked with executing the project.
- December 2015: After opposition from land owners and farmers, the government decided to change the airport location.
- September 2016: The government proposed Purandar in the Pune district as the new site for the airport. The team comprising 15 officials visited the villages of Pargaon Memane, Rajewadi, Waghapur, Ambodi, Pisarve, Rajodi, Jejuri, and Saswad for a technical feasibility survey of the location. The airport was expected to be fully functional by 2021.
- September 2020: The government considered a proposal for site change from the selected area in Purandar after land owners and farmers opposition.
- March 2025: Land Acquisition started by MIDC under 'pass through method' approved by state industrial minister Uday Samant after a high-power committee meeting.
- October 2026: Land acquisition for the airport has reached 76% completion with 96% of farmers consenting to selling land.
- December 2026: The airport is expected to start construction.

== See also ==
- Navi Mumbai International Airport
