= Maharashtra Industrial Development Corporation =

State government agency in Maharashtra, India

Agency overview
- Formed: 1 August 1962
- Preceding agency: Board of Industrial Development (BID)
- Jurisdiction: Government of Maharashtra
- Headquarters: Udyog Sarathi, Andheri East, Mumbai, Maharashtra, India
- Minister responsible: Uday Samant, Minister for Industries
- Agency executive: Shri Deependra Singh Kushwah, IAS, CEO
- Website: https://midc.maharashtra.gov.in/en/

Maharashtra Industrial Development Corporation (MIDC) is a project of the government of Maharashtra state in India and is the leading corporation of Maharashtra. It provides businesses with infrastructure such as land (open plot or built-up spaces), roads, water supply, drainage facilities and street lights. Shri. Deependra Singh Kushwah, IAS, is the CEO of MIDC Maharashtra Industrial Development Corporation.

== History ==
After the formation of Maharashtra state on 1 May 1960, the government of Maharashtra constituted a "Board of Industrial Development" (BID) on 1 October 1960, under the chairmanship of Shri. S. G. Barve, I.C.S. The committees recommendations received in the industries department were taken up for implementation. As per the Borkar Committee's recommendations, development of Ulhas Valley Water Supply was entrusted to the Board of Industrial Development (BID). The BID framed the legislation; it was introduced before the state legislation and passed in the form of "Maharashtra Industrial Development Act" which gave birth to MIDC, as a separate corporation on 1 August 1962. A small ceremony at Wagle estate, Thane, under the chairmanship of the Chief Minister Yashwantrao Balwantrao Chavan.

The key historical policy decisions taken by MIDC changed the socioeconomic scenario of the state as its activities spread in the interior. The important policy decision of setting up "independent filtered, potable water supply system of adequate capacity" as essential infrastructure for industrial development was the most intelligent step taken by MIDC in the beginning. It stabilised the population base near the industrial areas. The simultaneously strategic decision taken to provide water supply to nearby population from the capabilities created by MIDC of their own water supply system resulted in phenomenal urban growth in the nearby small towns and villages. The growth of Kalyan complex and Pimpri-Chinchwad are results of this key policy decision taken by MIDC.

Up to date 233 industrial areas are developed by MIDC in Maharashtra on 53120 hectors. With the experience of 45 years, MIDC observed that certain industries are required to be provided some specialized facilities. For the growth of industries and specialized parks/industrial clusters are developed with specialized infrastructure facilities. In this way IT & BT Parks, Wine Parks, Textile Parks, Chemical Zones, Food Parks, Leather Park, Floriculture Park and Electronic Zone etc. are developed by the MIDC.

Considering the international standard facilities required to attract multinational companies, five-star industrial areas are developed by MIDC at nine locations in Maharashtra. Considering the export potential of the products delineated duty-free, which is to be deemed to be foreign territory for the purpose of trade operations and duties and traffics, special economic zones are being developed by MIDC to provide hassle free environment for exporters. Maharashtra got overwhelming 74 Special Economic Zone approvals from the government of India which is in first position compare to other states in India.

The planned and systematic industrial development in the State of Maharashtra has continuously placed Maharashtra in first position in India for the highest productivity, economics performance, business efficiency, government efficiency, infrastructures and overall competitiveness. As per the World Competitiveness Report 2006, Maharashtra ranked 37, ahead of South Korea, South Africa, Philippines, Greece, Brazil, Italy, Russia and Indonesia.

In the state, MIDC has demarcated 57,650 plots and allotted 48,701 plots to entrepreneurs. There are 28918 industries in production. MIDC has provided the water supply scheme 2240.83 MLD capacity and water consumption is 1314.73 MLD in the MIDC areas in the state. MIDC has provided water supply pipelines of 3238.60 km to cater the demand of the industries in Maharashtra. The annual revenue generated from the water supply is Rs.432.00 crores. 2422.82 km of roads are constructed by MIDC for providing good quality approach to the industries. The development expenditure of Rs.3096.75 crores is incurred for the infrastructure works by MIDC.

== List of MIDC's in Maharashtra ==
Region	Industrial Area
Mumbai	Andheri MIDC
Mumbai	Marol MIDC
Mumbai	Mahape MIDC
Pune	Chakan MIDC
Pune	Talegaon MIDC
Pune	Bhosari MIDC
Pune	Pimpri MIDC
Pune	Chinchwad MIDC
Pune	Hinjawadi MIDC
Pune	Ranjangaon MIDC
Pune	Baramati MIDC
Thane	TTC Industrial Area
Thane	MIDC Taloja Panvel Area
Thane	Wagle Industrial Estate
Chhatrapati Sambhajinagar	Waluj MIDC
Chatrapati Sambhaji Nagar	Chikalthana MIDC
Chatrapati Sambhaji Nagar	Ambad MIDC
Nashik	Satpur MIDC
Nagpur	Butibori MIDC
Nagpur	Hingna MIDC
Kolhapur	Gokul Shirgaon MIDC
Kolhapur	Shiroli MIDC
Solapur	Chincholi MIDC
Sangli	Miraj MIDC
Sangli	Sangli-Kupwad MIDC
Jalgaon	Jalgaon MIDC
Akola	Akola MIDC
Yavatmal	Yavatmal MIDC

== Achievements ==
- Built 225 industrial complexes with 1,300,000 acres (5,300 km^{2}) of land
- Developed specialized parks for different industrial sectors, including IT, BT, wine (grape processing) Park, Silver Zone, gems and jewellery, textiles, leather, chemical industry, electronics, food processing, foundry, steel, automobile, Manufacturers, floriculture etc.
- Elaborate network of industrial & domestic water supply, total quantity supplied 1285 MLD.

== See also ==
- Make In Maharashtra
- Bihar Industrial Area Development Authority
