= Suresh Kumar Neotia =

Indian industrialist

- Born: 8 September 1936; Calcutta, Bengal Presidency, British India
- Died: 7 May 2015 (aged 78); Kolkata, West Bengal, India
- Occupations: Industrialist; Entrepreneur; Art collector; Philanthropist
- Known for: Ambuja Cements
- Spouse: Gayatri
- Awards: Padma Bhushan; Harvard Business School-Economic Times Award

Suresh Kumar Neotia (8 September 1936 – 7 May 2015) was an Indian industrialist, entrepreneur, art collector, philanthropist and the co-founder of Ambuja Cements and associated companies. He was the chairman of the Group till 2009 when he relinquished the position in favor of his co-founder, Narotam Sekhsaria, and was chairman emeritus until his death.

The Government of India awarded him the third highest civilian honour of the Padma Bhushan, in 2008, for his contributions to trade and industry.

== Early life and education ==
Neotia, who was born on 8 September 1936 in a century-old business family in Kolkata and graduated in commerce from St. Xavier's College of Calcutta University,

== Career ==
He started his career attending to the family business along with his younger brother, Vinod Neotia, in the 1950s. Subsequently, he teamed with Narotam Sekhsaria, who was related to his sister-in-law, Bimla Poddar (wife of his eldest brother, Bimal Kumar Poddar, who had been adopted by their maternal grandfather), and started Gujarat Ambuja Cements Limited (GACL) in 1983.

A decade and a half later, he took over ACC Limited (then known as Associated Cement Companies), adding the company to Ambuja Neotia Group and reportedly led the Group to make it one of the market leaders in Indian cement industry, with a production capacity of over 22 million tonnes and a market capitalization of over ₹152 billion. He served as the chairman of the Group till his retirement from the post in 2009 but continued as one of the executive directors for two more years when he relinquished all executive posts, only to retain the position as the Chairman Emeritus of the Group. A 2005 listing by Business Standard daily placed him at 35 among the richest Indians.

== Other interests and recognition ==
Neotia was the chairman of Balrampur Chini Mills Limited and sat on the boards of several companies, including the India International Centre, IIT Gandhinagar, NDIMAmbuja Educational Institute, Dwarikesh Sugar Industries, RKBK Limited, Ganpati Medical Institute, Heritage Palaces and Sarais and Boutique Hotels India Limited. He was involved with many educational institutions such as IIM Ahmedabad, IIT Gandhinagar, Banaras Hindu University, Jawaharlal Nehru University and New Delhi Institute of Management as a trustee or board member. He was a member of the Board of the Reserve Bank of India, Ananta Aspen Centre, Asiatic Society and Victoria Memorial Trust.

He was one of the promoters of Jnana-Pravaha, a cultural institution founded by Bimla Poddar, and served as its chairman. It is at Jnana Pravaha campus where his art collections are housed, which have since been compiled into a book, under the title, Indian Art Treasures - Suresh Neotia Collection. His philanthropic activities were channeled via two trusts, Neotia Foundation and Sri Govind Deo Ji Trust, through which he maintained his association with institutions such as CII-Suresh Neotia Centre for Excellence, Institute of Technology and Marine Engineering (NITMAS), Bhagirathi Neotia Women and Child Care Centre, Udayan Care, Apne Aap World Wide, Bharatiya Yuva Shakti Trust and the Indian Institute of Crafts and Design, Jaipur. He was a recipient of the Harvard Business School - Economic Times Award and the Government of India awarded him the civilian honor of the Padma Bhushan in 2008.

== Death ==
He suffered from renal problems and cancer in his latter years and died in Kolkata on 7 May 2015, at the age of 78, survived by his wife Gayatri (they had no children) and by his younger brother, Vinod Kumar Neotia, father of Harshvardhan Neotia.

== See also ==
- Narotam Sekhsaria
- Ambuja Cements
- Harshavardhan Neotia
- Bimla Poddar
- Institute of Technology and Marine Engineering
- Indian Institute of Crafts and Design
