= Sankarparulia =

- Village
- Location in West Bengal Location in India
- Coordinates: 22.2841°N 88.1261°E
- Country: India
- State: West Bengal
- District: South 24 Parganas
- CD Block: Diamond Harbour II

Area
  - Total: 0.43 km^{2} (0.17 sq mi)
- Elevation: 8 m (26 ft)

Population (2011)
  - Total: 1,221
  - Density: 2,800/km^{2} (7,400/sq mi)

Languages
  - Official: Bengali
  - Additional official: English
- Time zone: UTC+5:30 (IST)
- PIN: 743504
- Telephone code: +91 3174
- Vehicle registration: WB-19 to WB-22, WB-95 to WB-99
- Lok Sabha constituency: Diamond Harbour
- Vidhan Sabha constituency: Falta
- Website: www.s24pgs.gov.in

Sankarparulia is a village within the jurisdiction of the Diamond Harbour police station in the Diamond Harbour II CD block in the Diamond Harbour subdivision of the South 24 Parganas district in the Indian state of West Bengal.

== Geography ==
Sankarparulia is located at 22°17′03″N 88°07′34″E. It has an average elevation of 8 metres (26 ft).

== Demographics ==
As per 2011 Census of India, Sankarparulia had a total population of 1,221.

== Transport ==
A short stretch of local roads link Sankarparulia to the National Highway 12.

== Healthcare ==
Sarisha Block Primary Health Centre at Sarisha, with 15 beds, is the major government medical facility in the Diamond Harbour II CD block.
