= Rajghat Power Station =

- Country: India
- Location: NCT Delhi
- Coordinates: 28°38′13″N 77°15′15″E
- Status: Operational
- Commission date: 1989
- Decommission date: December 2015
- Operator: IPGCL

Thermal power station
- Primary fuel: Coal

Power generation
- Units operational: 2
- Nameplate capacity: 135.00 MW

Rajghat Power Station is located at NCT Delhi. The power plant is one of the coal based power plants of IPGCL.

== Power plant ==
Rajghat Thermal Power Station has an installed capacity of 135 MW. The First unit was commissioned during 1989–90. Later the second unit was added. This power plant is one of two coal-fired power plants of IPGCL, the other being Indraprastha power station which was closed due to ageing. The water source for the plant is from Yamuna river. The coal source for the plant is from NCL and BINA mines.

== Installed capacity ==
Stage	Unit Number	Installed Capacity (MW)	Date of Commissioning	Status
Stage I	1	67.5	1989-90	Shut down in Dec 2015
Stage I	2	67.5	1989-90	Shut down in Dec 2015

== See also ==
- Pragati Power Station
- IPGCL Gas Turbine Power Station
