= Govindram Seksaria =

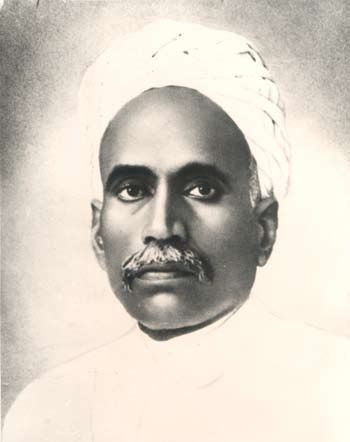
- Born: 19 October 1888; Nawalgarh, British India
- Died: 22 May 1946
- Occupation: Businessman
- Known for: Commodities Business, Real Estate, Educational Institutes
- Family: Seksaria

Govindram Seksaria was an Indian industrialist of the Seksaria family. He is known as the Cotton King of India. He was among the most successful industrialist of pre-independence India.

== Birth and early life ==
Govindram Seksaria was born on 19 October 1888. In Nawalgarh in present-day Rajasthan in a marwari family. He lost both his parents at an early age and took responsibility of his wife, brothers Bholaram, Ramnath, Makhanlal & two sisters. He moved from Nawalgarh to Mumbai (formerly Bombay) in the early 1900s and started operating under the name of Messrs. Govindram Seksaria. India was under the British Raj at that time, and every major industry was owned or managed by foreign firms that had the full support of the government. For Indian firms and businessmen, survival and growth was difficult and risky under a government that was both unsupportive and bleak. It was in such a hostile environment that Govindram Seksaria started his career as an operator on the Bombay Cotton Exchange. Within a few years, the Cotton Contract Board accepted his membership. Later, he became one of the original members of the East India Cotton Association. He went on to become a very famous name in the cotton market.

== Entry into other businesses ==
After his success in the cotton market, Seksaria soon entered into bullion and other commodity markets. He also delved in various stock exchanges in India including the Bombay Stock Exchange. He also became a founding member of the Indian Stock Exchange. Seksaria was a member of the following boards and chambers:

- Marwari Chambers of Commerce
- The Bombay Bullion Exchange
- The Bombay Seeds Brokers' Association
- The Indian Merchants' Chamber

== Entry in International Market ==
Though Seksaria was very successful in Indian markets, there was not much growth potential in the country at the time. So, in 1934, Seksaria became a member of the New York Cotton Exchange, a rare thing for an Indian in those days. Seksaria retained his membership till his death. He was also a member of the Liverpool Cotton Exchange and, later, the copper, sugar and wheat exchanges of various British and American cities.

== Establishment of Industries ==
Seksaria ventured into industry in 1937 by establishing Govindram Brothers Pvt. Ltd. Under this company he started a vegetable oil business and soon diversified into sugar, textile, minerals, mining, banking, printing and motion pictures. He also entered into real estate by establishing Estate Investment Co. Ltd. to manage his vast real estate holdings. In banking, he founded the Bank of Rajasthan. He also helped in Indian motion picture development through his close association with the Bombay Talkies studio. Seksaria was also a principal donor in the establishment of Bombay Hospital.

== His Family ==
His successors were his grandsons, Rajkumar Seksaria and Nandkumar Seksaria. Today, they manage his business. Family member Narotam Sekhsaria went onto found Ambuja Cements.

== Death and legacy ==
Govindram Seksaria died in 1946 at the age of 58. All the major markets in Mumbai, including the bullion exchange, cotton exchange and stock exchange remained closed that day as a tribute to this leader of industry. He established many schools and colleges. This trend continued with his son, the late Kudilalji Seksaria, who donated toward the Shri Govindram Seksaria Institute of Technology and Science. His sons, Rajkumar Seksaria and Nandkumar Seksaria, in turn, went on to establish the Govindram Seksaria Institute of Management and Research. He was a great person till date.

== Sources ==
- http://seksaria.org/
