= Jalan =

Jalan may refer to:

== Arts and entertainment ==
- Jalan (TV series), a 2020 Pakistani television series

== Companies ==
- Jalan.net, a Japanese online travel agency

== People ==
Surname

- Bimal Jalan (born 1941), Indian businesspeople
- Lalit Jalan (born 1956), Indian politician

Given name

- Jalan West (born 1993), American basketball player
- Jalan McClendon (born 1995), American football player

== See also ==
- , the Indonesian or Malay word for road
- JLN (disambiguation)
