= Delhi Vidyut Board =

State electricity agency in Delhi, India

The Delhi Vidyut Board (DVB) was formed by the Government of Delhi in 1997 for the purpose of generation and distribution of power to the entire area of NCT of Delhi except the areas falling within the jurisdiction of New Delhi Municipal Council and Delhi Cantonment Board. On 1 July 2002, The Delhi Vidyut Board was unbundled into six successor companies:

- Delhi Power Company Limited (DPCL) - Holding Company
- Indraprastha Power Generation Company Limited (IPGCL) - GENCO
- Delhi Transco Limited (DTL) - TRANSCO
- BSES Rajdhani Power Limited (BRPL) - DISCOM for South & West Delhi
- BSES Yamuna Power Limited (BYPL) - DISCOM for Central & East Delhi
- North Delhi Power Limited (NDPL) - DISCOM for North Delhi

== History of Electricity in Delhi ==
Ch. Balbir Singh Yadav. Jwala Heri Village Was Very First Chairman Of DESU. The position is that as per available records, the first diesel Power Station was established in Delhi in the year 1905 when a private English Company by name M/s. John Fleming was given permission to generate electricity under the provisions of the Indian Electricity Act 1903. The above-mentioned Company was given the responsibility both of generation and distribution of power in a limited manner. That Company after obtaining license under the provisions of Electricity Act 1903 had set up a small 2 MW Diesel set at Lahori Gate in Old Delhi. Later on, this very Company was converted as Delhi Electricity Supply and Traction Company. In the Year 1911, the power generation was augmented by Steam Generation Station. In the year 1932, the management of Central Power House was handed over to New Delhi Municipal Committee (NDMC). In the field of power generation and distribution, a major break through was achieved in 1939 when Delhi Central Electricity Power Authority (DCEPA) was established. This company was responsible for the supply of power to the areas covered by Local Bodies, namely, the Municipal Committees of Delhi, West Delhi and South Delhi, the Notified Area Committees of Red fort, Civil Lines, Mehrauli, Najaf Garh, and the District Board of Delhi. The supply of electricity to the Municipal Committees of Delhi-Shahdara and the Notified Area of Narela was done by different private agencies. In 1947 DCEPA took over a Private Limited Company by name Delhi electric Supply & traction Company Limited.

== Formation of Delhi State Electricity Board (DSEB) ==
In the year 1951 the Delhi State Electricity Board (DSEB) came into existence and the responsibility of generation and distribution of electricity was taken over by DSEB from DCEPA.

== Formation of Delhi Electric Supply Undertaking (DESU) ==
After the promulgation of the Delhi Municipal Corporation Act 1957, the DSEB was dissolved and the functions of DSEB were taken over by Delhi Electric Supply Undertaking (DESU), which came into existence in 1958. After the formation DESU, the generation and distribution of electricity to all the areas of Delhi came under DESU.

== Formation of Delhi Vidyut Board (DVB) ==
The Government of the National Capital Territory of Delhi vide notification No. F.11 (10)/92-LSG /PF (II) dated 24.02.1997, issued under the Electricity (Supply) Act, 1948, constituted a separate Electricity Board, i.e. the Delhi Vidyut Board (DVB) for the NCT of Delhi w.e.f. 24.02.1997 for the purpose of generation and distribution of power to the entire area of NCT of Delhi except the areas falling within the jurisdiction of NDMC and Delhi Cantonment Board.

== Unbundling of Delhi Vidyut Board (DVB) ==
The Delhi Vidyut Board (DVB) was a State Electricity Board set up in 1997 under the Electricity (Supply) Act, 1948, succeeding the Delhi Electricity Supply Undertaking (DESU) which has existed since 1957 as a wing of the Municipal Corporation of Delhi. It was an integrated utility with generation, transmission and distribution functions serving all of Delhi except the NDMC and MES (Cantoment) areas to which it supplied power in bulk.

Delhi Electricity Board Regulatory Commission (DERC) was constituted in May 1999 whose prime responsibility was to look into the entire gamut of existing activity and search for various ways of power sector reforms. The DERC is even today a fully functional body which has since issued tariff orders for annual revenue requirement. Delhi Electricity Reform Ordinance, 2000 was a body which was promulgated in October 2000 and notified in the form of an Act in March 2001. It mainly provides for the constitution of an Electricity Regulatory Commission, unbundling of DVB into separate generation, transmission and distribution companies and increasing avenues for participation of private sector.

This was followed with a Tripartite Agreement which was signed by the government of Delhi, DVB employees to ensure the cooperation of stakeholders in this reform process.

Next, a two-stage competitive bidding process of Request for Qualification (RFQ) and Request for Proposal (RFP) was set into motion for privatization of the distribution companies.

The bidders were selected on the basis of reduction of total Aggregate Technical and Commercial of losses (AT & C) a unique feature of the power sector reforms in Delhi. The bidders were required to bid on the basis of efficiency improvement like reduction of AT & C losses that they achieve year wise over a period of five years.
