= Tata Power Delhi Distribution Limited =

Indian public-private utility company

Tata Power Delhi Distribution Limited (TPDDL)
- Type: Joint venture
- Industry: Electric utility
- Founded: 4 July 2002; 24 years ago
- Headquarters: TPDDL House, GTB Nagar, Delhi, India
- Key people: Dwijadas Basak (CEO); Suranjit Mishra (CFO)
- Services: Electricity distribution
- Owners: Tata Power (51%); Government of Delhi (49%)
- Website: www.tatapower-ddl.com

Tata Power Delhi Distribution Limited (TPDDL), formerly North Delhi Power Limited (NDPL), is an Indian electric utility serving the northern and western parts of Delhi. It is a joint venture between the Government of NCT of Delhi and Tata Power Company Limited, which holds a 51% majority stake in the venture.

It started operations on 1 July 2002 and currently serves 7 million people in the North and North West parts of Delhi. It has a registered consumer base of 1.90 million. The company's operations span an area of 510 sq. km. with a recorded peak load of around 2115 MW as of June 2022.

The company was the first in the country to initiate an Automated Metering Infrastructure based Auto Demand Response programme to help manage grid stress and peak demand.

== Origins ==
Tata Power Delhi Distribution Limited was initially known as the North Northwest Delhi Distribution Company and subsequently renamed North Delhi Power Limited. In 2011, nine years after it first started operations, its name was changed once again to Tata Power Delhi Distribution Limited

In June 2002, the distribution network of the erstwhile Delhi Vidyut Board was privatised as per the provisions of the Delhi Electricity Reform Act, 2000 and the Delhi Electricity Reform (Transfer Scheme) Rules, 2001. The Delhi Vidyut Board was unbundled and split into six entities managed by BSES Limited (now Reliance Infrastructure) and Tata Power. These six companies were BSES Rajdhani Power Limited, BSES Yamuna Power Limited, Delhi Transco Limited, Indraprastha Power Generation Company Limited, Delhi Power Company Limited, and North Delhi Power Limited (known today as Tata Power Delhi Distribution Limited).

Under the agreement, Tata Power gained a 51% stake in the North and Northwest Delhi firm with a payment of Rs. 187 crores. It also agreed to reduce the Aggregate Technical and Commercial (AT&C) losses of the firm by 17% in the next five years

On 1 July 2002, Tata Power Delhi Distribution Limited began its operations as the North Northwest Delhi Distribution Company

== Challenges ==
After it began its operations in 2002, Tata Power Delhi Distribution Limited was faced with four key problems:

- More than 50% Aggregate Technical and Commercial (AT&C) losses were being recorded, made considerably worse by rampant power theft, faulty meters and open(bare conductor) overhead networks.
- The electricity supply system in the North and Northwest Delhi distribution area was extremely unreliable due to inadequate network planning and infrastructure.
- No IT interface or consumer services existed. Inherited only 2 computers that too in non-functional conditions.
- There was no system of consumer services, a backlog of 1,00,000 complaints when it took over
- The 5400 employees of the erstwhile Delhi Vidyut Board who were absorbed into Tata Power Delhi Distribution Limited exhibited attitudinal and cultural issues. Their working conditions were far below Tata standards.
- Energy companies have a new weapon to tackle electricity theft.

== Shareholding ==
Tata Power Delhi Distribution Limited is owned by the Government of Delhi and Tata Power. A majority stake of 51% was acquired by Tata Power in 2002–03 post the unbundling of the Delhi Government owned Delhi Vidyut Board in the form of equity and preference shares. Since then it has paid a total dividend of Rs.367.41 crores on five occasions to its stakeholders – Tata Power and the Delhi Government. In mid-2008, the company issued bonus shares. In 2014, the Tata Power Delhi Distribution Limited paid a total of Rs.1285 crores as dividend to its shareholders.

== Smart technology ==
In 2003, Tata Power Delhi Distribution Limited made its first ten-year technology roadmap. Different technologies such as SCADA, GIS, Distribution Management System (DMS), Distribution Automation (DA) and SAP components including Outage Management System (OMS) were implemented in the following years

By 2008, TPDDL had achieved 100% consumer indexing using GIS in its area of business, the first step towards implementing its smart grid project. The second phase of the smart grid project was launched in October, 2013

In 2014, the company became the first Indian power utility to launch an Automated Demand Response (ADR) Project with smart meters in the capital. This Rs. 12.5 crore pilot project was implemented in partnership with IBM, Honeywell, Landis+Gyr and with the participation of select Industrial and Commercial Consumers of Tata Power Delhi Distribution. It is one of the first projects in the world where ADR and AMI (Advanced Metering Infrastructure for Smart Meters) were conceptualised together. The project was rolled out with approval from the Delhi Electricity Regulatory Commission (DERC)

Apart from ADR infrastructure, the projects components include Smart Meters, Radio Frequency (RF) Mesh Based Communication, Meter Data Management System (MDMS) and integration with other previously existing operational technology and IT systems like OMS and SAP. It covers over 100 km^{2}. of Industrial & Commercial Belt in North and North-West Delhi and will help to analyse consumption patterns and optimise equipment performance. Up to 250 consumers are participating in the project, leading to a collective shed potential of 20 MW. Future plans include extending the project to include 800 additional consumers which would lead to a shed potential of another 20 MW

Tata Power Delhi Distribution Limited was hailed for its initiatives in smart grid technologies at the International Conference & Exhibition on Smart Grids and Smart Cities organised by India Smart Grid Forum 2015 (ISGF) in March, 2015

TPDDL launches GPS and RFID technology for quick resolution of faults

Tata Power-DDL has organised a Capacity Building and Training Programme on the best practices in power distribution for employees of Kano Electricity Distribution Company (KEDCO) and Kaduna Electric Plc.

== Projects ==
Tata Power Delhi Distribution Limited provides consultancy services in the power sector to companies in the country and abroad. The company offers project management, technical advisory, IT enablement and managed services amongst a host of other services.

- Project Management: Business Process Reengineering, IT Solutions, Smart Metering Solutions, GIS, OMS, AMI, SAP Implementation, Demand Side Management, Energy Efficiency.
- Technical Advisory: SCADA & Automation, Smart Grid, Network Planning, System Improvement, O&M services, Loss Reduction Services, Distributed Power Generation (Renewable and Non-Renewable)
- IT Services: Consumer Relationship Management, Revenue Management, Automated Meter Reading & Data Analysis, Energy Audit Application and Performance Management.
- Managed Services: Technical and Management Strategy Services, Open Access, Capacity Building and Change Management, strategic business unit, Commercial Process Outsourcing, Business Process Outsourcing.

The company has provided consultancy services to various companies in India, Bhutan, Mauritius, Nigeria, Uganda and Yemen. Recently, the company has also entered into providing System Integrator services for IT and OT Implementation.
