= Raychak =

- Village
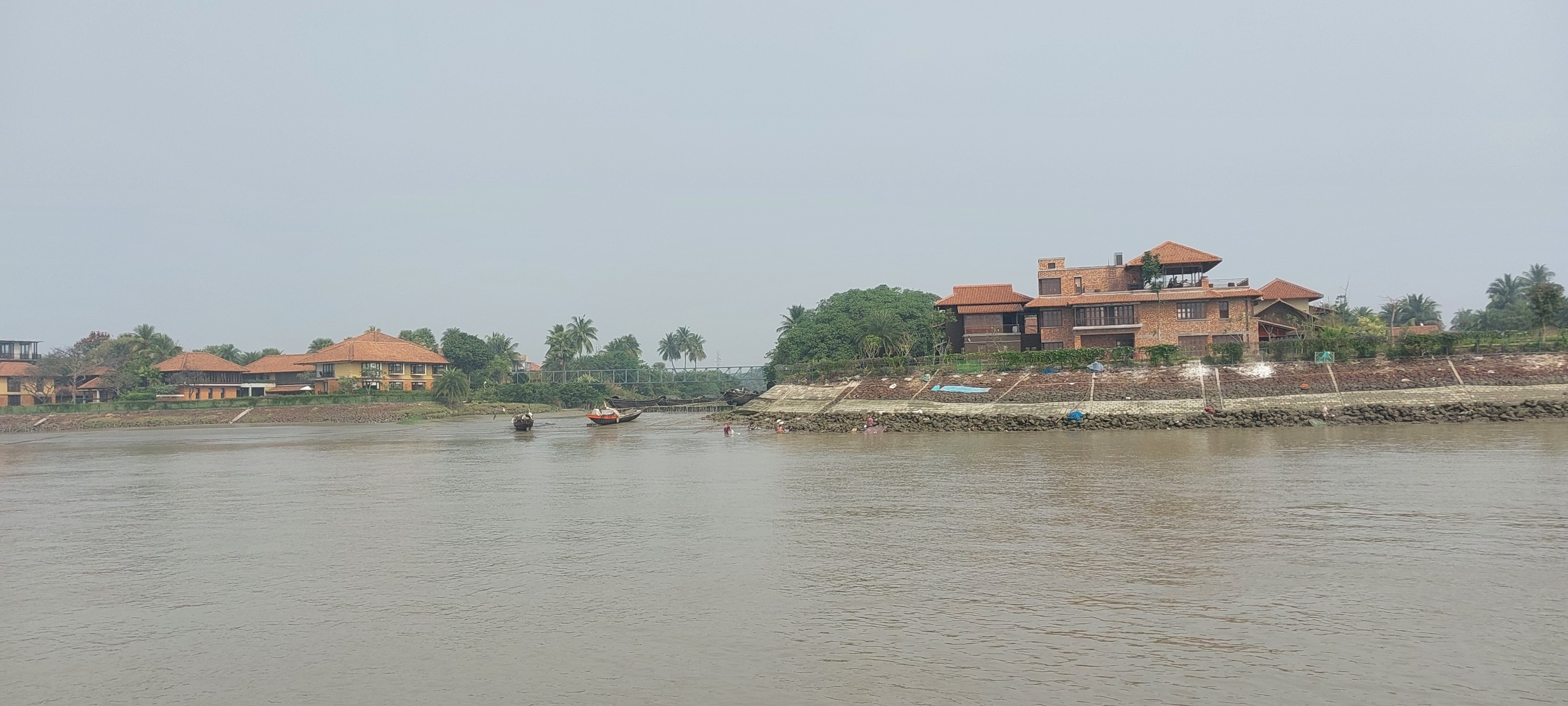
- Raichak, riverside

- Location in West Bengal Location in India
- Coordinates: 22.2187°N 88.1218°E
- Country: India
- State: West Bengal
- District: South 24 Parganas
- CD Block: Diamond Harbour II

Area
  - Total: 0.58 km^{2} (0.22 sq mi)
- Elevation: 8 m (26 ft)

Population (2011)
  - Total: 1,243
  - Density: 2,100/km^{2} (5,600/sq mi)

Languages
  - Official: Bengali
  - Additional official: English
- Time zone: UTC+5:30 (IST)
- PIN: 743368
- Telephone code: +91 3174
- Vehicle registration: WB-19 to WB-22, WB-95 to WB-99
- Lok Sabha constituency: Diamond Harbour
- Vidhan Sabha constituency: Diamond Harbour
- Website: www.s24pgs.gov.in

Raychak is a village within the jurisdiction of the Diamond Harbour police station in the Diamond Harbour II CD block in the Diamond Harbour subdivision of the South 24 Parganas district in the Indian state of West Bengal.

== Geography ==
Cities and towns in the western part of Diamond Harbour subdivision (including Falta, Diamond Harbour I & II, Kulpi CD blocks) in South 24 Parganas district
M: municipal city/ town, CT: census town, R: rural/ urban centre, N: neighbourhood, H: historical place/ religious centre
Owing to space constraints in the small map, the actual locations in a larger map may vary slightly

=== Area overview ===
Diamond Harbour subdivision is a rural subdivision with patches of urbanization. Only 14.61% of the population lives in the urban areas and an overwhelming 85.39% lives in the rural areas. In the western portion of the subdivision (shown in the map alongside) there are 11 census towns. The entire district is situated in the Ganges Delta and the western part, located on the east bank of the Hooghly River, is covered by the Kulpi Diamond Harbour Plain, which is 5–6 metres above sea level. Archaeological excavations at Deulpota and Harinarayanpur, on the bank of the Hooghly River indicate the existence of human habitation more than 2,000 years ago.

Note: The map alongside presents some of the notable locations in the subdivision. All places marked in the map are linked in the larger full screen map.

=== Location ===
Raychak is located at 22°13′07″N 88°07′18″E. It has an average elevation of 8 metres (26 ft).

== Demographics ==
According to the 2011 Indian Census, Raychak had a total population of 1,243, of which 630 were males and 613 were females. There were 125 persons in the age range of 0 to 6 years. The total number of literate persons in Raychak was 823, which constituted 66.2% of the population with male literacy of 72.2% and female literacy of 60.0%. The effective literacy rate of 7+ population of Raychak was 73.6%, of which male literacy rate was 80.4% and female literacy rate was 66.7%. The Scheduled Castes and Scheduled Tribes population was 1,133 and 3 respectively. Raychak had 282 households in 2011.

== Economy ==
=== Tourism ===
The fort at Raychak gradually fell into ruins and was converted to a lively 5-star hotel, Raichak on Ganges, formerly Radisson Fort.

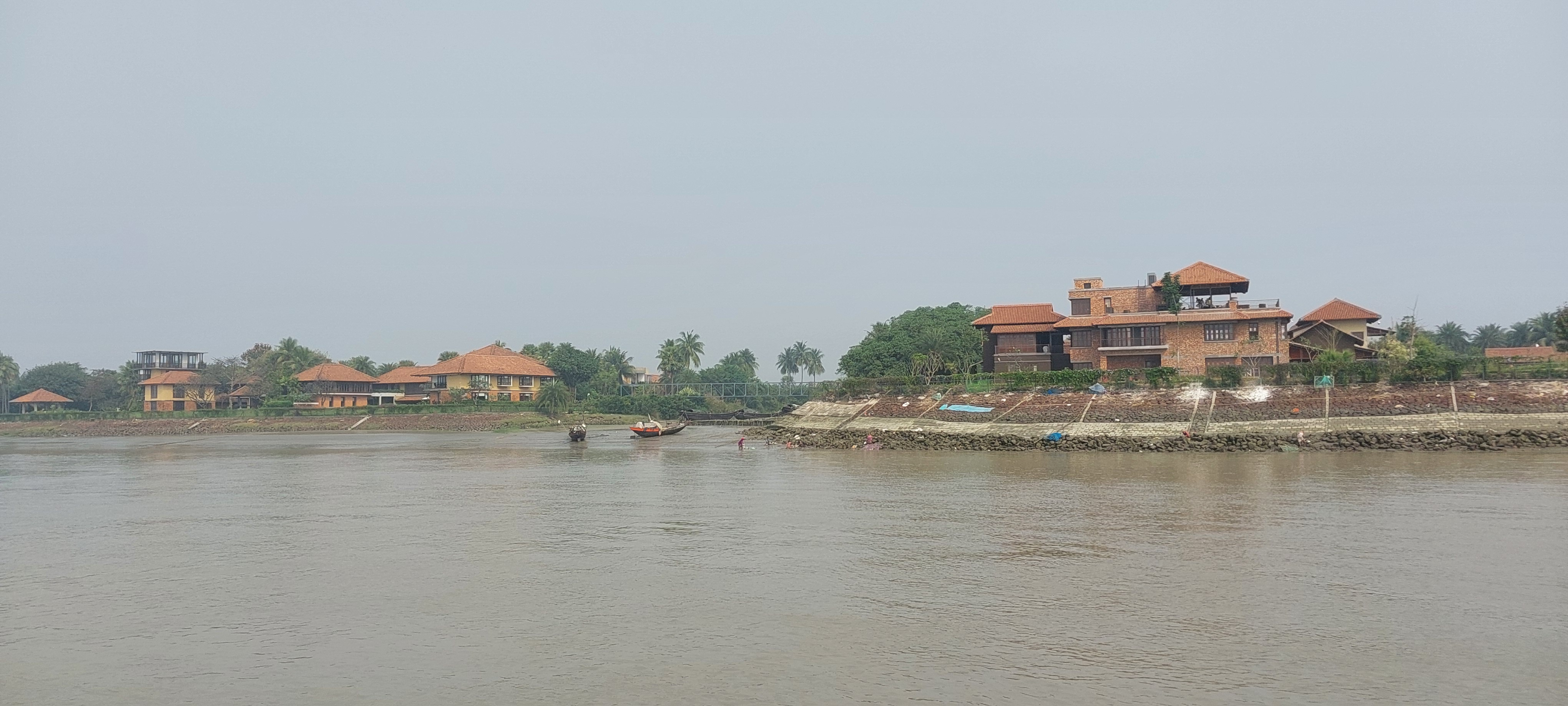
a view of Raichak village from Bhagirathi river

There is a scenic view of the river. Those who are adventurous can also use the Raychak jetty or the nearby Nurpur jetty and take a ferry across the river to go to Kukrahati in East Midnapore district or Gadiara in Howrah district.

== Transport ==
A short stretch of local roads link Raychak to the National Highway 12.

=== Bridge proposal ===
From 2003 to 2007, there was a proposal to bridge the Hooghly River from Raychak to Kukrahati. The proposal went through many phases, with support being sought from Malaysian and Japanese companies. In the final version of the proposal, the Indonesian Salim Group would have handled construction.

The Salim Group had also agreed to construct the Eastern Link Highway, which would have been 100 km long and 100 m wide and spread over 2,500 acres (10 km^{2}). The road would have linked Barasat with Raychak, ultimately terminating at Nandigram. The projects were to be implemented by New Kolkata International Development Private Ltd, a special purpose company that had been promoted by the Salim Group, the Universal Success Group and Unitech.

The entire project and associated programmes were abandoned by the Left Front government after the Nandigram violence in 2007. There were suggestions in 2012 that the All India Trinamool Congress was considering reviving the project.

== Healthcare ==
Sarisha Block Primary Health Centre at Sarisha, with 15 beds, is the major government medical facility in the Diamond Harbour II CD block.
