= Bhushna =

- Village
- Location in West Bengal Location in India
- Coordinates: 22.2522°N 88.1763°E
- Country: India
- State: West Bengal
- District: South 24 Parganas
- CD block: Diamond Harbour II

Area
  - Total: 1.15 km^{2} (0.44 sq mi)
- Elevation: 8 m (26 ft)

Population (2011)
  - Total: 4,147
  - Density: 3,610/km^{2} (9,340/sq mi)

Languages
  - Official: Bengali
  - Additional official: English
- Time zone: UTC+5:30 (IST)
- PIN: 743368
- Telephone code: +91 3174
- Vehicle registration: WB-19 to WB-22, WB-95 to WB-99
- Lok Sabha constituency: Diamond Harbour
- Vidhan Sabha constituency: Diamond Harbour
- Website: www.s24pgs.gov.in

Bhushna is a village within the jurisdiction of the Diamond Harbour police station in the Diamond Harbour II CD block in the Diamond Harbour subdivision of the South 24 Parganas district in the Indian state of West Bengal.

== Geography ==
Cities and towns in the western part of Diamond Harbour subdivision (including Falta, Diamond Harbour I & II, Kulpi CD blocks) in South 24 Parganas district
M: municipal city/ town, CT: census town, R: rural/ urban centre, N: neighbourhood, H: historical place/ religious centre
Owing to space constraints in the small map, the actual locations in a larger map may vary slightly

=== Area overview ===
Diamond Harbour subdivision is a rural subdivision with patches of urbanization. Only 14.61% of the population lives in the urban areas and an overwhelming 85.39% lives in the rural areas. In the western portion of the subdivision (shown in the map alongside) there are 11 census towns. The entire district is situated in the Ganges Delta and the western part, located on the east bank of the Hooghly River, is covered by the Kulpi Diamond Harbour Plain, which is 5–6 metres above sea level. Archaeological excavations at Deulpota and Harinarayanpur, on the bank of the Hooghly River indicate the existence of human habitation more than 2,000 years ago.

Note: The map alongside presents some of the notable locations in the subdivision. All places marked in the map are linked in the larger full screen map.

=== Location ===
Bhushna is located at 22.2522°N 88.1763°E.

== Demographics ==
According to 2011 Census of India, Bhushna had a total population of 4,147, of which 2,118 (51%) were males and 2,029 (49%) were females. There were 600 persons in the age range of 0–6 years. The total number of literate persons in Bhushna was 2,688 (78.78% of the population over 6 years).

== Transport ==
Bhushna is off the National Highway 12.

== Education ==
Shishuram Das College, established in 2010, is affiliated to the University of Calcutta. It offers honours courses in Bengali, English, history, philosophy, education, and a general course in arts.

== Healthcare ==
Sarisha Block Primary Health Centre at Sarisha, with 15 beds, is the major government medical facility in the Diamond Harbour II CD block.
