= Bimla Poddar =

Indian social worker

- Born: 28 August 1936; Varanasi, Uttar Pradesh, India
- Died: 14 May 2025 (aged 88)
- Occupations: Social worker, philanthropist
- Known for: Philanthropy
- Spouse: Bimal Kumar Poddar
- Awards: Padma Shri

Bimla Poddar (28 August 1936 – 14 May 2025) was an Indian social worker, businessperson, philanthropist and the founder of Jnana Pravaha, affectionately known as Bari Ma.

== Early & Personal life ==
Bimla was born and brought up in Varanasi, in the Indian state of Uttar Pradesh. She was married into a rich business family to late Bimal Kumar Poddar. She was also known for her deep passion for classical music.

== Work ==
Bimla used to hold the directorship of many of the family concerns which includes Ambuja Cements. Jnana Pravaha is a Varanasi based centre for cultural studies founded by Poddar with Suresh Neotia, engaged in the efforts to preserve the cultural heritage of India. Under the aegis of the organization, Poddar was involved in activities related to exploration of India's culture and maintained a heritage museum housing artifacts from ancient India.

== Awards & Recognition ==
She was honoured by the Government of India in 2015 with Padma Shri, the fourth highest Indian civilian award.

== Death ==
Bimla died in Varanasi on May 14, 2025, just a few months before her 89th birthday in August. She was cremated in Varanasi.

== See also ==
- Tarachand Ghanshyamdas
- Culture of India
