= BSES =

BSES may refer to

- BSES Expeditions, a youth development charity based in the United Kingdom.
- Reliance Energy, formerly known as Bombay Suburban Electric Supply (BSES).
- BSES Yamuna Power Limited
