= IICD =

The acronym IICD is used by at least four organisations:

- The Indian Institute of Crafts and Design, an arts academy located in Jaipur, India
- The Independent International Commission on Decommissioning, a group set up to oversee the decommission of weapons from conflict in Northern Ireland
- The International Institute for Communication and Development, a development aid agency established by the government of The Netherlands
- The Institute for International Cooperation and Development, a private nonprofit organization based in Massachusetts and Michigan, USA
