= BSES Yamuna Power Limited =

Electricity company

BSES Yamuna Power Limited (BYPL)
- Type: Public Private Company
- Industry: Electric utility
- Founded: 4 July 2001
- Headquarters: Shakti Kiran Building, Karkardooma, Delhi, India
- Key people: Lalit Jalan (Chairman); Amarjeet Singh (CEO); Mitesh Shah (CFO); Suresh Agarwal (Company Secretary)
- Services: Electricity distribution
- Owners: Reliance Infrastructure (51%); Government of Delhi (49%)
- Parent: Reliance Infrastructure
- Website: bsesdelhi.com/web/bypl

BSES Yamuna Power Limited (BYPL) is a joint venture between the Government of Delhi and Reliance Infrastructure Limited, which holds a 51% majority stake in the venture. It is one of the three electricity distribution companies in Delhi, the other two being BSES Rajdhani Power Limited and Tata Power Delhi Distribution Limited. BYPL started operations in July 2002 and currently serves 1.65 million people in the Central and East parts of Delhi. The company's operations span an area of 200 km^{2} (77 sq mi) with a recorded peak load of around 1,459 MW.

It distributes power to 14 divisions across Central & East Delhi areas including Chandni Chowk, Darya Ganj, Dilshad Garden, Jhilmil, Karawal Nagar, Krishna Nagar, Laxmi Nagar, Mayur Vihar, Vasundhara Enclave, Nandnagri, Pahar Ganj, Patel Nagar, Shankar Road, and Yamuna Vihar.

== Origins ==
In 2002, the distribution network of the erstwhile Delhi Vidyut Board was privatised as per the provisions of the Delhi Electricity Reform Act, 2000 and the Delhi Electricity Reform (Transfer Scheme) Rules, 2001. The Delhi Vidyut Board was unbundled and split into six entities and i.e. Delhi Power Company Limited (holding company), Indraprastha Power Generation Company, Delhi Transco Limited, BSES Rajdhani Power Limited, BSES Yamuna Power Limited and North Delhi Power Limited (now Tata Power Delhi Distribution Limited).

== e-Vehicle charging ==
Deputy Chief Minister of Delhi, Manish Sisodia inaugurated the first public e-vehicle charging station of Delhi in his Patparganj constituency on 18 July 2020. The e-vehicle charging station is set up under a partnership between BSES Yamuna Power Limited and EV Motors India Private Limited. The Patparganj station can charge four vehicles at a time, in 45 to 90 minutes, depending on the vehicle type.
