= Lalit Jalan =

Indian businessman (born 1956)

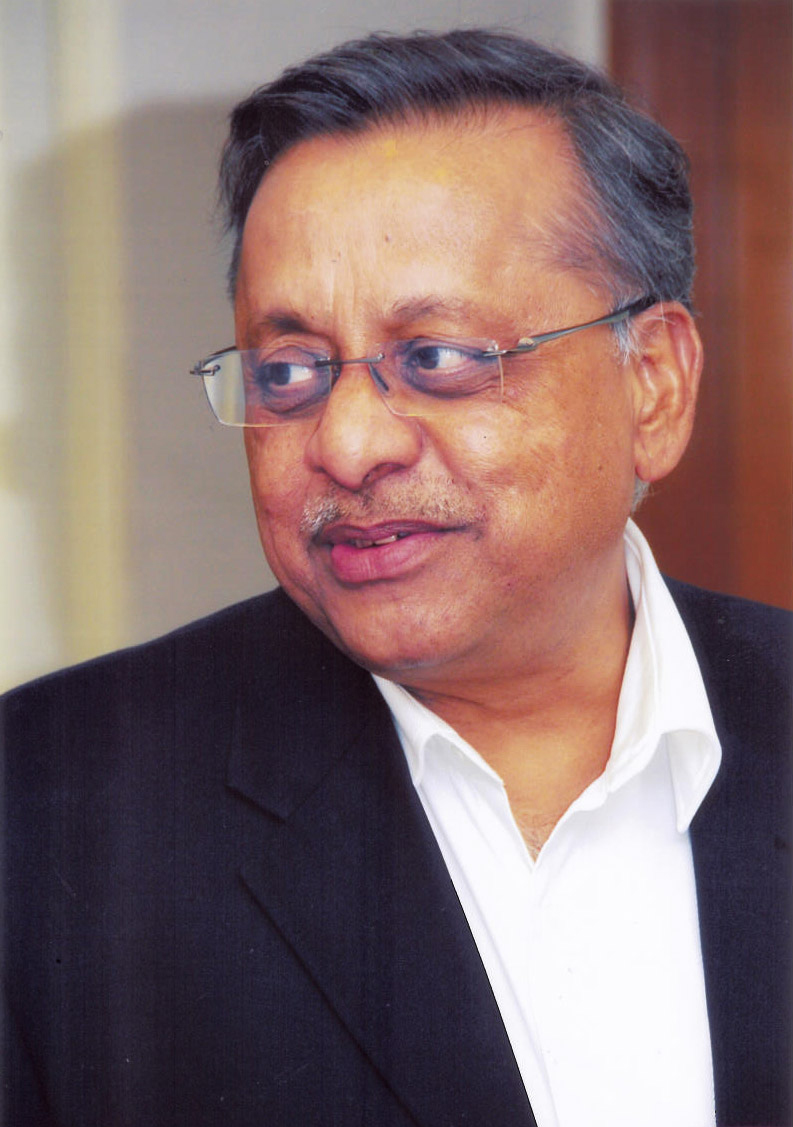
- Born: 23 September 1956 (age 70); Kolkata, West Bengal, India
- Education: The Wharton School; Moore School of Engineering; IIT Kanpur
- Occupations: CEO of Reliance Infrastructure (20 August 2016 to 06 April 2019); Chairman of BSES Delhi; Director of several firms (registered in Kolkata)
- Spouse: Anita Jalan
- Children: Akshay Jalan & Varun Jalan
- Website: www.lalitjalan.in/lalitjalan/biography.html

Lalit Jalan is the advisor and former chief executive officer of Reliance Infrastructure, part of the Reliance Anil Dhirubhai Ambani Group, one of India's largest corporations. He is the chairman of BSES Rajdhani Power Limited and BSES Yamuna Power Limited and is a director in several companies including Reliance Defence Ltd, which is associated with the Rafale deal between India and France.

Apart from his major responsibilities in the Reliance group owned by Anil Ambani, he is also a director of several other firms from his native town Kolkata, and some bear his family name "Jalan" including Jalan Brothers Private Limited, Jalan Properties Private Limited, Jalan Infosystems Private Limited, Jalan Reality Private Limited, Data Ware Private Limited, etc.

He continues to hold the post of Chairman of BSES Rajdhani and BSES Yamuna Power Limited, the electricity distribution companies in joint-venture with Government of NCT Delhi. RInfra is one of India's largest integrated infrastructure company developing projects, through various special purpose vehicles, in several high growth areas in the infrastructure sector including power, roads, metro, airport, cement and EPC.

== Early life and education ==
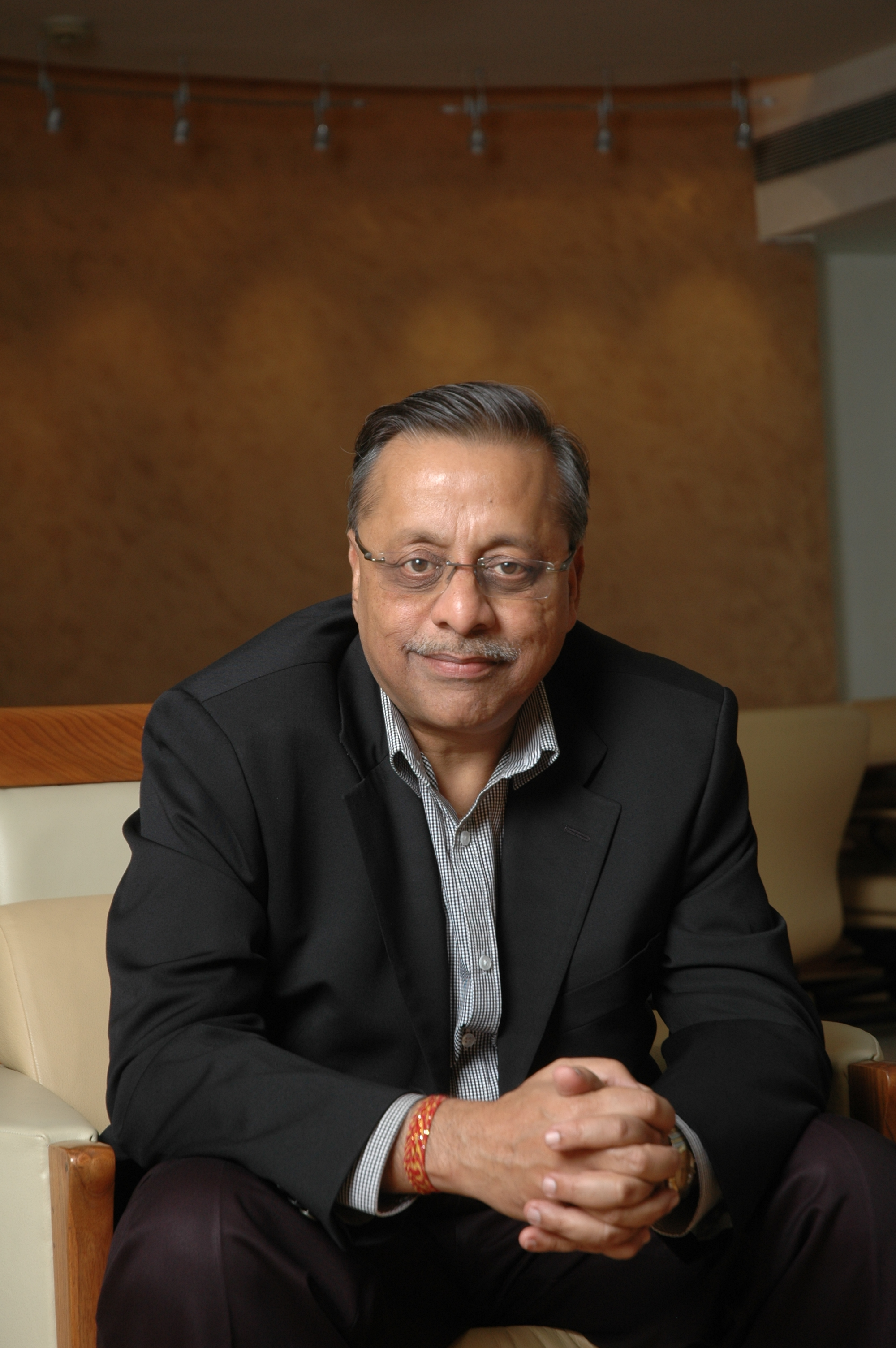
Lalit Jalan

Lalit Jalan was born in Kolkata in a Marwari family. He attended St. Xaviers School during the early 1970s. Jalan now resides in Mumbai with his family which includes his parents, wife Anita, and two sons, who are also Wharton graduates and handle his family business.

== Career ==
Jalan started his career at General Electric as a Strategic Planner where he was mentored by Jack Welch. After working there for two years, he returned to India and joined his own family venture Jalan Brothers, a distributor of plastic products. in his hometown Kolkata. Jalan claims to have turned it into a Rs 250-crore business before acceding to his Wharton School classmate Anil Ambani's wish to join the Reliance Industries Limited.

In 1995, Jalan joined Reliance Industries Limited (RIL) as the Head of Polypropylene Business. Jalan made the fastest ‘billion dollar hit’ in the industry by increasing business from zero to a billion dollars in 42 months with no prior experience in the petrochemicals industry. He also been Head of the E-business at RIL, where he initiated practices such as e-procurement and SAP within the group.

Jalan has worked for Reliance Group in many roles, including CEO of RInfra's Delhi power distribution company, where he reduced power theft from 55% and improved operations. Jalan joined Reliance Industries Limited as Chief Executive Officer, Polypropylene Business in 1995. At 39, he was the youngest ever CEO at Reliance.

From 2003 onwards, Jalan has led Reliance Energy, a distribution company into the over Rs 23000 crore RInfra. Today RInfra is India's largest integrated infrastructure development firm with interests in power, roads, metros, airports, cement and other urban infrastructure projects with a turnover exceeding $4.5 billion.

He became CEO of Reliance Infrastructure on 20 August 2016 and resigned on 6 April 2019 due to his retirement. Since then, he is associated with R-Infra as Advisor under new CEO Punit Garg.

== Education ==
Jalan studied Electrical Engineering at the Indian Institute of Technology Kanpur (IIT Kanpur) in 1979. He completed an MBA from Wharton School, University of Pennsylvania in 1981 and MS (Computer Science) from Moore School of Engineering. In 2002, he was conferred with the distinguished alumnus award of IIT Kanpur for his outstanding managerial skills.

== Controversies ==
New Delhi power distribution companies BSES Yamuna and BSES Rajdhani, for which Jalan was Chairman, have been the focus of controversies concerning energy metering, the frequent removal of CEOs and recent government-ordered audit, and the threat of Revocation of License and Non-Payment of dues to Power Suppliers like NTPC.

== Settlement with Indian Stock Market Regulator ==
Securities and Exchange Board of India (sebi.gov.in) is the stock market regulator of India. It issued a consent order (no 426/2011 of 14 January 2011) directing Anil Ambani and others, including Lalit Jalan, to pay INR 250 million (approximately $6 million) to settle allegations they illegitimately used the funds from External Commercial Borrowings in the Indian stock market and without the applicant admitting or denying any charges or guilt.

The legality of such consent order was contested in court, and the government of India passed "Securities Law Amendment Ordinance 2013" on 18 July 2013, which retroactively legalized 426/2011. As the stipulated period of six months had elapsed before the ordinance was approved and regularized in to an Act by the Parliament of India (House of Representatives), again on the recommendation of the Government of India, the President of India has re-promulgated the same ordinance on 15 January 2014, which must be passed by the parliament within six months.
