= Narotam Sekhsaria =

Indian industrialist and philanthropist

Narrotam Satyanarayan Sekhsaria
- Born: Rajasthan, India
- Education: Institute of Chemical Technology, Mumbai
- Occupations: Industrialist; Entrepreneur; Philanthropist
- Known for: Ambuja Cements; ACC Limited; Ambuja Cement Foundation; Narotam Sekhsaria Foundation
- Spouse: Nalini Sekhsaria
- Children: Pulkit Sekhsaria; Padmini Sekhsaria
- Family: Seksaria

Narrotam Satyanarayan Sekhsaria is an Indian industrialist and philanthropist.

== Early life ==
Born in Chirawa, Rajasthan, India in the Seksaria Marwari trading family in 1950, he was brought up in Bombay and was educated as a chemical engineer from the city's University Department of Chemical Technology (UDCT), now known as Institute of Chemical Technology, Mumbai.

== Career ==
He started his career at his family business, predominantly trading cotton. He subsequently switched career in the early 1980s, giving up trading to set up Ambuja Cements. Over the next decade, Seksharia built Ambuja Cements into one of the world's most profitable cement companies. It was among the earliest companies in India to develop its own captive seaports and use sea transportation to ship cement across the country and abroad. Ambuja Cements went on to acquire a stake in ACC Limited, then India's best known and geographically speaking, the largest cement company. In 2005, Sekhsaria divested his interest in Ambuja Cements and ACC Ltd. and ceded control to Holcim Group, the Swiss multinational cement giant. Sekhsaria continues to be the non-executive chairman of Ambuja Cements and ACC Limited.

Sekhsaria is the chairman of Ambuja Cement Foundation, which he set up as part of Ambuja in the early 1990s and has since grown to become one of India's most extensive corporate CSR programs. It does work in the areas of rural development through agriculture, health, education, skill-building and women's empowerment initiatives.

He is also the chairman of the Narotam Sekhsaria Foundation, the philanthropic arm of his family office, which funds and supports individuals and organisations working in health, education, livelihoods, governance, art and culture.
