= Harshavardhan Neotia =

Indian businessman

- Born: 19 July 1961 (age 65); Kolkata, West Bengal, India
- Education: St. Xavier's College
- Occupations: Chairman, Ambuja Neotia Group
- Spouse: Madhu Neotia
- Parent: Vinod Kumar Neotia
- Relatives: Suresh Kumar Neotia (paternal uncle) Narotam Sekhsaria (maternal uncle)
- Website: ambujaneotia.com

Harshavardhan Neotia (born 19 July 1961) is the chairman of the Ambuja Neotia Group, an Indian conglomerate headquartered in Kolkata.

== Life and career ==
Harshavardhan Neotia was born and brought up in Kolkata in a Marwari family. He attended La Martiniere Calcutta for Boys and graduated in Commerce from St. Xavier's College, Kolkata. He has completed HBS's Executive Education Programme - Owner President Management Program (OPM) from Harvard Business School.

He is the founder of one of the first joint sector companies in India, Bengal Ambuja Housing Development Limited, in partnership with the Government of West Bengal. The idea behind this joint sector venture was to promote social housing development in urban India. Neotia's maiden project, Udayan was declared a "Model Housing Project" by the union government.

He is a member of the board of governors' of IIM Calcutta.

== Awards ==
He was conferred the Padma Shri in the year 1999 for his initiative in the field of social housing. He has been awarded with Young Presidents' Organization YPO Legacy of Honor Award and works as the Honorary Consul of Israel in West Bengal.
