= JLN =

JLN may refer to one of the following:

- JLN Corporation, owned by Janet Lim-Napoles
- Joplin Regional Airport, Missouri, US, IATA code
- Jacqui Lambie Network, a minor Australian political party
- Jawaharlal Nehru (1889-1964), first prime minister of India (1947-1964)

== See also ==
- Jalan (disambiguation)
