= Indraprastha Power Generation Company =

Delhi, India's electricity generation company

Indraprastha Power Generation Company Limited
- Company type: Government-owned Corporation-PSU
- Industry: Electricity generation
- Founded: 4 July 2001
- Headquarters: Rajghat Power House complex, New Delhi, India
- Key people: Ravi Dahwan (IAS) (Chairman & MD); Mukesh Kumar (Director - Technical); S singh (Director - Finance); Dhiraj jain (Company Secretary)
- Products: Electricity
- Website: http://ipgcl-ppcl.gov.in/

Indraprastha Power Generation Company Limited (IPGCL) is the electricity generation company of the Government of Delhi state in India.

== History ==
IPGCL came into existence on 1 July 2002 after unbundling of Delhi Vidyut Board (DVB) commenced operations from the same date. It was formed as part of power sector reforms by the state government to unbundle the activities relating to Generation, Transmission and Distribution of Power. All the Generating Stations owned by erstwhile DVB.

== Generation capacity ==
The installed capacity of IPGCL as on 31 July 2010 is 405 MW comprising 135.00 MW from coal-based thermal and 270.0 MW from gas-based thermal power plants. IPGCL is one of the power generating utilities in the capital city of Delhi along with PPCL.

- Rajghat Power Station. Coal-based thermal power plant of 135 MW installed capacity.
- IPGCL Gas Turbine Power Station. Gas-based thermal power plant of 270 MW installed capacity.
- Indira Gandhi Super Thermal Power Project, APCPL Jhajjar. Coal-based thermal power plant of 1500 MW installed capacity.

== See also ==
- Pragati-1 Power Station. A 330 MW gas-based power plant operated by Pragati Power Corporation Limited (PPCL).
- Pragati-III Combined Cycle Power Plant. A 1500 MW gas-based thermal power plant.
