= Diamond Harbour II =

Community Development Block in West Bengal, India

- Community Development Block
- Location of Diamond Harbour II community development block in South 24 Parganas district
- Coordinates: 22.1910091°N 88.1904741°E
- Country: India
- State: West Bengal
- Division: Presidency
- District: South 24 Parganas
- Subdivision: Diamond Harbour
- Headquarters: Sarisha

Government
  - Gram Panchayats: Bhadura Haridas, Kalatalahat, Kamarpole, Khorda, Mathur, Nurpur, Patra, Sarisa
  - Lok Sabha constituencies: Diamond Harbour
  - Vidhan Sabha constituencies: Diamond Harbour, Falta

Area
  - Total: 95.59 km^{2} (36.91 sq mi)

Population (2011)
  - Total: 190,801
  - Density: 1,996/km^{2} (5,170/sq mi)
  - Urban: 4,993

Demographics
  - Literacy: 76.91 per cent
  - Sex ratio: 953 ♂/♀

Languages
  - Official: Bengali
  - Additional official: English
- Time zone: UTC+05:30 (IST)
- Website: s24pgs.gov.in

Diamond Harbour II is a community development block that forms an administrative division in Diamond Harbour subdivision of South 24 Parganas district in the Indian state of West Bengal.

== History ==
Deulpota is an important archaeological site in this CD block.

== Geography ==

The Diamond Harbour II CD block is located at 22°11′28″N 88°11′26″E. It has an average elevation of 8 metres (26 ft).

The Diamond Harbour II CD block is bounded by the Falta CD block in the north, the Diamond Harbour I CD block in the east, the Sutahata CD block in the Purba Medinipur district, across the Hooghly, in the south, the Shyampur I CD block in the Howrah district, across the Hooghly, in the west.

The South 24 Parganas district is divided into two distinct physiographic zones: the marine-riverine delta in the north and the marine delta zone in the south. As the sea receded southwards, in the sub-recent geological period, a large low-lying plain got exposed. Both tidal inflows and the rivers have been depositing sediments in this plain. The periodical collapse of both the natural levees and man-made embankments speed up the process of filling up of the depressions containing brackish water wetlands. The marine delta in the south is formed of interlacing tidal channels. As non-saline water for irrigation is scarce, agriculture is monsoon dominated. Some parts of the wetlands are still preserved for raising fish.

The Diamond Harbour II CD block has an area of 95.59 km^{2}. It has 1 panchayat samity, 8 gram panchayats, 136 gram sansads (village councils), 92 mouzas and 89 inhabited villages, as per the District Statistical Handbook, South Twenty-four Parganas. Patra village is located partly in Diamond Harbour I and partly in Diamond Harbour II CD Block. Diamond Harbour, Parulia Coastal and Ramnagar police stations serve this CD Block. Headquarters of this CD block is at Sarisha.

Gram panchayats of the Diamond Harbour II CD block/panchayat samiti are: Bhadura Haridas, Kalatalahat, Kamarpole, Khorda, Mathur, Nurpur, Patra and Sarisa.

== Demographics ==
=== Population ===
According to the 2011 Census of India, the Diamond Harbour II CD block had a total population of 190,801, of which 185,808 were rural and 4,993 were urban. There were 97,686 (51%) males and 93,115 (49%) females. There were 23,395 persons in the age range of 0 to 6 years. The Scheduled Castes numbered 50,666 (26.55%) and the Scheduled Tribes numbered 79 (0.04%).

According to the 2001 Census of India, the Diamond Harbour II CD block had a total population of 165,154, out of which 84,575 were males and 80,579 were females. The Diamond Harbour II CD block registered a population growth of 14.79 per cent during the 1991-2001 decade. Decadal growth for the South 24 Parganas district was 20.89 per cent. Decadal growth in West Bengal was 17.84 per cent. The Scheduled Castes at 46,965 formed around one-third the population. The Scheduled Tribes numbered 1,848.

Census Town in the Diamond Harbour II CD block (2011 census figures in brackets): Patdaha (4,993).

Large villages (with 4,000+ population) in the Diamond Harbour II CD block (2011 census figures in brackets): Bishra (4,274), Nainan (5,144), Gopalpur (4,118), Ramnagar (4,655), Nurpur (7,527), Bhushna (4,147), Kamarpol (10,880), Chandnagar (4,156) and Patra (8,310).

Other villages in the Diamond Harbour II CD block include (2011 census figures in brackets): Raychak (1,243), Mathur (2,536), Khorda (2,696) and Bhaduria (3,709).

=== Literacy ===
According to the 2011 census, the total number of literate persons in the Diamond Harbour II CD block was 128,756 (76.91% of the population over 6 years) out of which males numbered 70,196 (82.00% of the male population over 6 years) and females numbered 58,560 (71.59% of the female population over 6 years). The gender disparity (the difference between female and male literacy rates) was 10.40%.

According to the 2011 Census of India, literacy in the South 24 Parganas district was 77.51 Literacy in West Bengal was 77.08% in 2011. Literacy in India in 2011 was 74.04%.

According to the 2001 Census of India, Diamond Harbour II CD block had a total literacy of 70.75 per cent for the 6+ age group. While male literacy was 79.53 per cent female literacy was 61.50 per cent. South 24 Parganas district had a total literacy of 69.45 per cent, male literacy being 79.19 per cent and female literacy being 59.01 per cent.

See also – List of West Bengal districts ranked by literacy rate

Literacy in CD blocks of
South 24 Parganas district
Alipore Sadar subdivision
Bishnupur I – 78.33%
Bishnupur II – 81.37%
Budge Budge I – 80.57%
Budge Budge II – 79.13%
Thakurpukur Maheshtala – 83.54%
Baruipur subdivision
Baruipur – 76.46%
Bhangar I – 72.06%
Bhangar II – 74.49%
Jaynagar I – 73.17%
Jaynagar II – 69.71%
Kultali – 69.37%
Sonarpur – 79.70%
Canning subdivision
Basanti – 68.32%
Canning I – 70.76%
Canning II – 66.51%
Gosaba – 78.98%
Diamond Harbour subdivision
Diamond Harbour I – 75.72%
Diamond Harbour II – 76.91%
Falta – 77.17%
Kulpi – 75.49%
Magrahat I – 73.82%
Magrahat II – 77.41%
Mandirbazar – 75.89%
Mathurapur I – 73.93%
Mathurapur II – 77.77%
Kakdwip subdivision
Kakdwip – 77.93%
Namkhana – 85.72
Patharpratima – 82.11%
Sagar – 84.21%
Source: 2011 Census: CD Block Wise
Primary Census Abstract Data

=== Language ===
Languages of Diamond Harbour II CD block (2011)
1. Bengali (99.7%)
2. Hindi (0.32%)
3. Urdu (0.02%)
4. Others (0.01%)

At the time of the 2011 census, 99.65% of the population spoke Bengali, 0.32% Hindi and 0.02% Urdu as their first language.

=== Religion ===
Religion in Diamond Harbour II CD block (2011)
Hinduism	59.77%
Islam	39.68%
Other or not stated	0.55%

In the 2011 Census of India, Hindus numbered 114,039 and formed 59.77% of the population in the Diamond Harbour II CD block. Muslims numbered 75,716 and formed 39.68% of the population. Others numbered 1,046 and formed 0.55% of the population. In 2001, Hindus and Muslims were 62.74% and 37.13% of the population respectively.

The proportion of Hindus in the South Twenty-four Parganas district has declined from 76.0% in 1961 to 63.2% in 2011. The proportion of Muslims in the South Twenty-four Parganas district has increased from 23.4% to 35.6% during the same period. Christians formed 0.8% in 2011.

== Rural poverty ==
According to the Human Development Report for the South 24 Parganas district, published in 2009, in the Diamond Harbour II CD block the percentage of households below poverty line was 27.30%, a moderate level of poverty. In the north-east and mid central portion of the district, all CD blocks, with the exception of the Kulpi CD block, had poverty rates below 30%. As per rural household survey in 2005, the proportion of households in the South 24 Parganas with poverty rates below poverty line was 34.11%, way above the state and national poverty ratios. The poverty rates were very high in the Sundarbans settlements with all the thirteen CD blocks registering poverty ratios above 30% and eight CD blocks had more than 40% of the population in the BPL category.

== Economy ==
=== Livelihood ===
Livelihood
in Diamond Harbour II CD block
1. Cultivators (7.27%)
2. Agricultural labourers (21.7%)
3. Household industries (6.24%)
4. Other Workers (64.8%)

In the Diamond Harbour II CD block in 2011, among the class of total workers, cultivators numbered 5,033 and formed 7.27%, agricultural labourers numbered 15,022 and formed 21.69%, household industry workers numbered 4,322 and formed 6.24% and other workers numbered 44,870 and formed 64.80%. Total workers numbered 69,247 and formed 36.29% of the total population, and non-workers numbered 121,554 and formed 63.71% of the population.

The District Human Development Report points out that in the blocks of the region situated in the close proximity of the Kolkata metropolis, overwhelming majority are involved in the non-agricultural sector for their livelihood. On the other hand, in the Sundarbans settlements, overwhelming majority are dependent on agriculture. In the intermediate region, there is again predominance of the non-agricultural sector. Though the region is not very close to Kolkata, many places are well connected and some industrial/ economic development has taken place.

Note: In the census records a person is considered a cultivator, if the person is engaged in cultivation/ supervision of land owned by self/government/institution. When a person who works on another person's land for wages in cash or kind or share, is regarded as an agricultural labourer. Household industry is defined as an industry conducted by one or more members of the family within the household or village, and one that does not qualify for registration as a factory under the Factories Act. Other workers are persons engaged in some economic activity other than cultivators, agricultural labourers and household workers. It includes factory, mining, plantation, transport and office workers, those engaged in business and commerce, teachers, entertainment artistes and so on.

=== Infrastructure ===
There are 67 inhabited villages in the Diamond Harbour II CD block, as per the District Census Handbook, South Twenty-four Parganas, 2011. 100% villages have power supply. 67 villages (100%) have drinking water supply. 14 villages (20.90%) have post offices. 60 villages (89.55%) have telephones (including landlines, public call offices and mobile phones). 26 villages (29.21%) have pucca (paved) approach roads and 46 villages (51.69%) have transport communication (includes bus service, rail facility and navigable waterways). 3 villages (3.37%) have agricultural credit societies and 7 villages (7.87%) have banks.

=== Agriculture ===
The South 24 Parganas had played a significant role in the Tebhaga movement launched by the Communist Party of India in 1946. Subsequently, Operation Barga was aimed at securing tenancy rights for the peasants. In the Diamond Harbour II CD block 692.65 acres of land was acquired and vested. Out of this 286.96 acres or 34.21% of the vested land was distributed. The total number of patta (document) holders was 1,244.

According to the District Human Development Report, agriculture is an important source of livelihood in the South Twentyfour Parganas district. The amount of cultivable land per agricultural worker is only 0.41 hectare in the district. Moreover, the irrigation facilities have not been extended to a satisfactory scale. Agriculture mostly remains a mono-cropped activity.

As per the District Census Handbook, the saline soil of the district is unfit for cultivation, but the non-salty lands are very fertile. While rice is the main food crop, jute is the main cash crop.

In 2013-14, there were 78 fertiliser depots, 15 seed stores and 57 fair price shops in the Diamond Harbour II CD block.

In 2013–14, Diamond Harbour II CD block produced 2,241 tonnes of Aman paddy, the main winter crop, from 1,418 hectares, 4,655 tonnes of Boro paddy (spring crop) from 1,440 hectares. It also produced pulses.

=== Pisciculture ===
In the Diamond Harbour II CD block, in 2013-14, the net area under effective pisciculture was 800 hectares, engaging 10,643 persons in the profession, and with an approximate annual production of 95,962 quintals.

Pisciculture is an important source of employment in the South 24 Parganas district. As of 2001, more than 4.5 lakh people were engaged in pisciculture. Out of this 2.57 lakhs were from the 13 blocks in the Sundarbans settlements.

=== Banking ===
In 2013-14, the Diamond Harbour II CD block had offices of 10 commercial banks and 1 gramin banks.

=== Backward Regions Grant Fund ===
The South 24 Parganas district is listed as a backward region and receives financial support from the Backward Regions Grant Fund. The fund, created by the Government of India, is designed to redress regional imbalances in development. As of 2012, 272 districts across the country were listed under this scheme. The list includes 11 districts of West Bengal.

== Transport ==
The Diamond Harbour II CD block has 5 ferry services, 17 originating/ terminating bus routes. The nearest railway station is 8 km from the block headquarters.

== Education ==
In 2013-14, the Diamond Harbour II CD block had 118 primary schools with 9,375 students, 5 middle schools with 412 students, 14 high schools with 4,736 students and 11 higher secondary schools with 8,300 students. Diamond Harbour II CD block had 2 technical and professional institutions with 1,474 students and 275 institutions for special and non-formal education with 12,571 students. Diamond Harbour municipal area (outside the CD blocks) had a general degree college with 5,213 students.

See also – Education in India

According to the 2011 census, in the Diamond Harbour II CD block, among the 89 inhabited villages, all villages have schools, 37 villages had two or more primary schools, 29 villages had at least 1 primary and 1 middle school and 23 villages had at least 1 middle and 1 secondary school.

- Diamond Harbour Women's University was established at Sarisha in 2013.
- Neotia Institute of Technology Management and Science was established at PO Amira in 2002.
- Shishuram Das College was established at Bhushna, Kamarzole in 2010,

== Healthcare ==
In 2014, the Diamond Harbour II CD block had 1 block primary health centre, 1 primary health centre and 11 private nursing homes with total 95 beds and 18 doctors (excluding private bodies). It had 22 family welfare subcentres. 1,751 patients were treated indoor and 182,116 patients were treated outdoor in the hospitals, health centres and subcentres of the CD block.

According to the 2011 census, in the Diamond Harbour II CD block, 1 village had a community health centre, 5 villages had primary health centres, 33 villages had primary health subcentres, 19 villages had maternity and child welfare centres, 2 villages had veterinary hospitals, 16 villages had medicine shops and out of the 89 inhabited villages 26 villages had no medical facilities.

Sarisha Block Primary Health Centre at Sarisha, with 15 beds, is the major government medical facility in the Diamond Harbour II CD block. There are primary health centres at Gandia Raghunathpur (with 6 beds) and Paschim Bhabanipur (PO Mukundapur) (with 6 beds).
