= Neotia Institute of Technology Management and Science =

Engineering college in West Bengal, India

- Motto: 'Towards Tomorrow'
- Type: Private
- Established: 2002
- Affiliations: Maulana Abul Kalam Azad University of Technology
- Chairman: Harshavardhan Neotia
- Director: Tapan Kumar Bose
- Administrative staff: 200 (on-campus approx)
- Students: 1,400 (on-campus approx)
- Location: Jhinga, Diamond Harbour Road, South 24 Parganas, West Bengal, 743368, India; 22°15′41.06″N 88°11′44.77″E
- Campus: Suburban
- Website: http://nitmas.edu.in/
- Location within West Bengal Location within India

The Neotia Institute of Technology Management and Science or NITMAS. is a private engineering college in the state of West Bengal, India. Situated on Diamond Harbor Road 39 kilometers (24 mi) on the south western fringes of Kolkata, the institute is affiliated to the Maulana Abul Kalam Azad University of Technology formerly Known as West Bengal University of Technology and approved by All India Council of Technical Education (AICTE) and Directorate General of Shipping, India.

== About ==
The institute was established in 2002. Neotia Institute of Technology Management and Science was previously known as Institute of Technology and Marine Engineering(ITME). From 2006 the college started a three-year graduate program in Bachelor of Nautical Science. As of 2010, the institute comes under the Ambuja Neotia Group.

== Campus ==
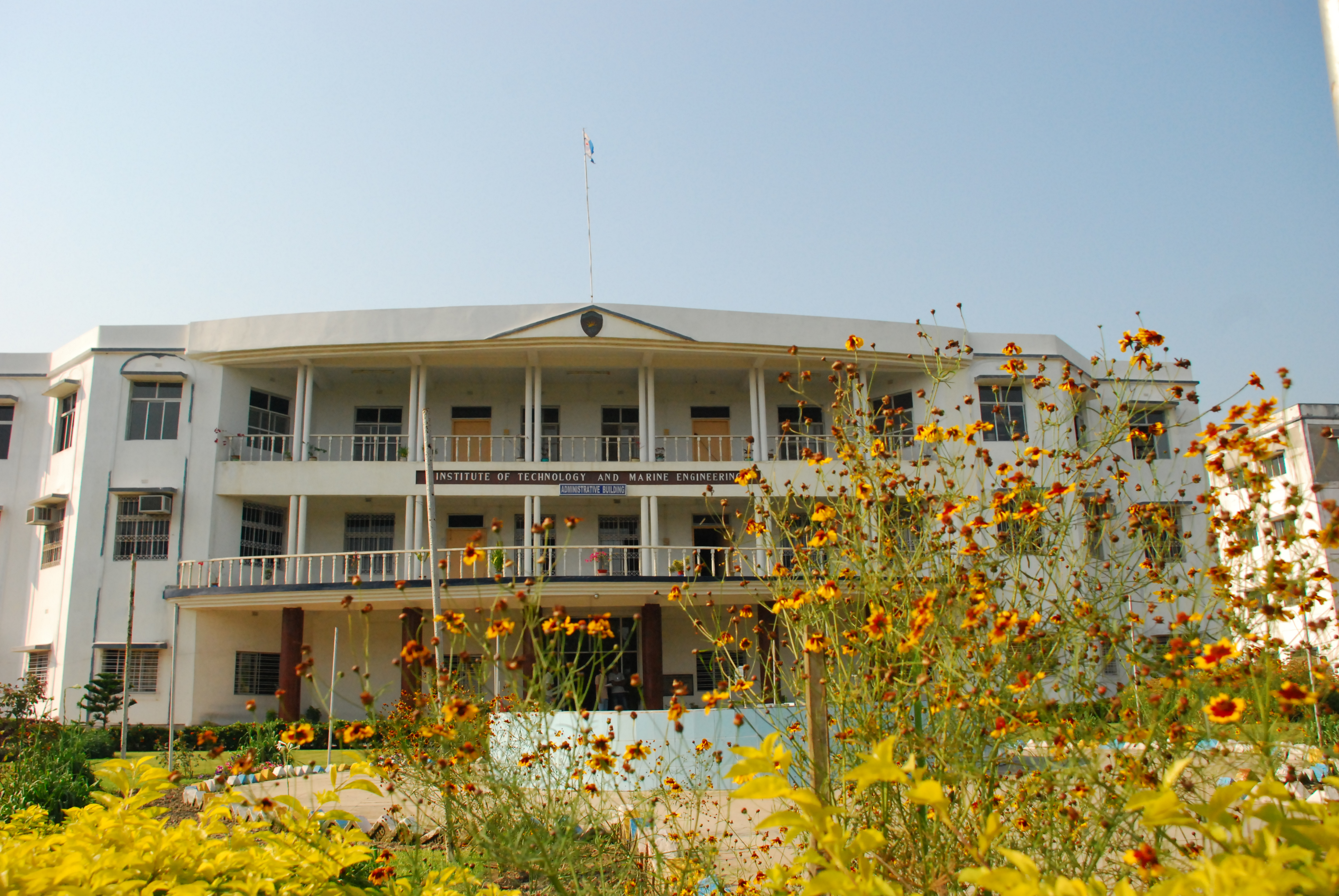
The main building in the campus in 2008

The college is entirely residential. There is a residential arrangement for some of the professors, faculty lecturers, and other staff members. A medical health center is situated inside the campus. There are seven hostels:

- Hostel 4 - boys of all the streams (except for the marine engineering and B.N.S.) from 2nd year onwards
- Hostel 3 - Girls of all depts.

The campus is spread over a 35-acre (140,000 m^{2}) area, with outdoor and indoor sports facilities like cricket, soccer, basketball, table tennis, carrom etc. The campus has a Tea Junction, Cyber Cafe and a cafeteria along with stationary shops. The campus is Wi-Fi enabled and has a swimming pool. There is a gym and a beauty salon.

The institute has a model ship on campus for training marine engineers.

== Academics ==
The college offers undergraduate bachelor's degree courses under West Bengal University of Technology in the following disciplines :

- Bio-technology
- Computer Science & Engineering
- Electrical and Electronics Engineering
- Electronics and communication Engineering
- Marine Engineering
- Mechanical Engineering
- B.Sc in Nautical Science (three years)

master's degree courses are offered for

- M.Tech in VLSI Design

== See also ==
- List of institutions of higher education in West Bengal
- Education in India
- Education in West Bengal
