= Ambuja Cements =

Indian cement company

Ambuja Cements Limited
- Formerly: Gujarat Ambuja Cements Limited (1983–2007)
- Type: Public
- Traded as: BSE: 500425; NSE: AMBUJACEM
- Industry: Building materials
- Founded: 1983; 43 years ago
- Founders: Suresh Kumar Neotia; Narotam Sekhsaria
- Headquarters: Mumbai, Maharashtra, India
- Key people: Gautam Adani (Chairman); Ajay Kapur (MD); Vinod Bahety (CEO)
- Products: Cement
- Revenue: ▲₹35,045 crore (US$3.6 billion) (2025)
- Operating income: ▼₹5,971 crore (US$620 million) (2025)
- Net income: ▲₹5,158 crore (US$540 million) (2025)
- Total assets: ▲₹80,945 crore (US$8.4 billion) (2025)
- Total equity: ▲₹63,811 crore (US$6.6 billion) (2025)
- Owner: Adani Group (63.2%)
- Number of employees: 4,509 (2025)
- Parent: Adani Group
- Subsidiaries: ACC; Penna Cement; Sanghi Industries; Orient Cement; Jaypee Cement
- Website: www.ambujacement.com
- Footnotes; Financials as of 31 March 2025.

Ambuja Cements Limited, formerly known as Gujarat Ambuja Cement Limited (GACL), is an Indian cement producing company, which markets cement and clinker for both domestic and export markets.

== History ==
The company entered into a strategic partnership with Holcim, the second-largest cement manufacturer in the world from 2006. Holcim had, in January, bought a 14.8 percent promoters' stake in the GACL for ₹2,140 crore.

From 2010 to 2022, Holcim held a 61.62% controlling stake in Ambuja Cements. On 14 April 2022, Holcim announced that it would exit from the Indian market after 17 years of operations as part of a strategy to focus on core markets, and listed its stakes in Ambuja Cements and ACC for sale. On 15 May 2022, Adani Group acquired Holcim's stake in Ambuja Cements and ACC for US$10.5 billion.

In August 2023, Ambuja Cement acquired Sanghi Industries at an enterprise value of ₹5,000 crore. In June 2024, Ambuja Cements acquired Hyderabad-based Penna Cement Industries at an enterprise value of ₹10,422 crore.

In October 2024, Ambuja Cement acquired CK Birla Group's Orient Cement at an approximate value of ₹8,100 crore.

== Controversies ==
=== Trademark litigation ===
In September 2025, Ambuja Cements initiated a trademark infringement lawsuit against JSW Cement in the Delhi High Court. The company alleged that JSW's "Jal Kavach" water-repellent cement was deceptively similar to its "Ambuja Kawach" brand, which was registered in 2019. Ambuja sought a permanent injunction and damages, citing phonetic and visual similarities in branding. The court subsequently referred both parties to mediation to explore a potential out-of-court settlement.

=== Sanghi Industries Acquisition Dispute ===
Following its ₹5,185 crore acquisition of Sanghi Industries in December 2023, Ambuja Cements entered a legal dispute with Sanghi's former promoter, Alok Sanghi. The dispute arose after Ambuja Cements invoked a personal guarantee to demand ₹84 crore from Sanghi for pre-acquisition liabilities concerning an unpaid electricity bill. Ambuja Cements initiated personal insolvency proceedings against Sanghi under Section 95 of the Insolvency and Bankruptcy Code (IBC) before the Ahmedabad bench of the National Company Law Tribunal (NCLT). Sanghi contested the action before the National Company Law Appellate Tribunal (NCLAT), maintaining that the 2023 share purchase agreement outlined corporate warranties and indemnities rather than personal guarantees. The litigation concluded in May 2026 after both parties reached an out-of-court settlement, resulting in the mutual withdrawal of the petitions before both tribunals.

== Gallery ==
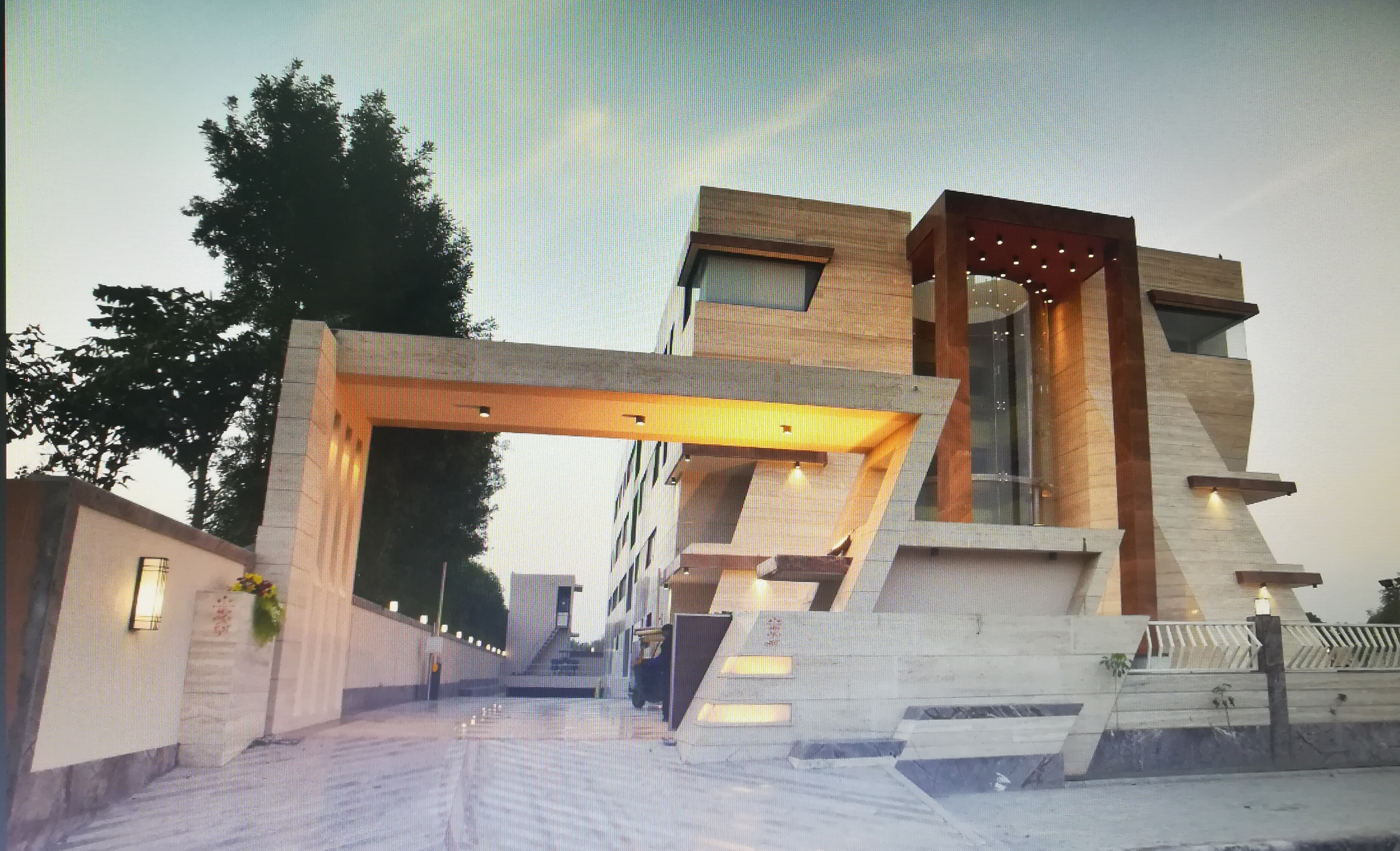
Ambuja Tower corporate office in Ahmedabad

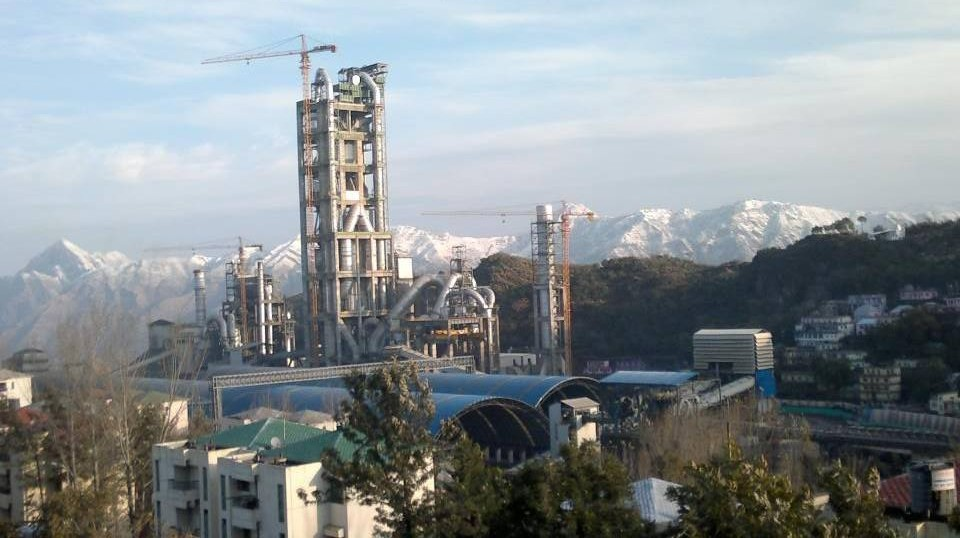
Ambuja Cements plant in Darlaghat, Himachal Pradesh

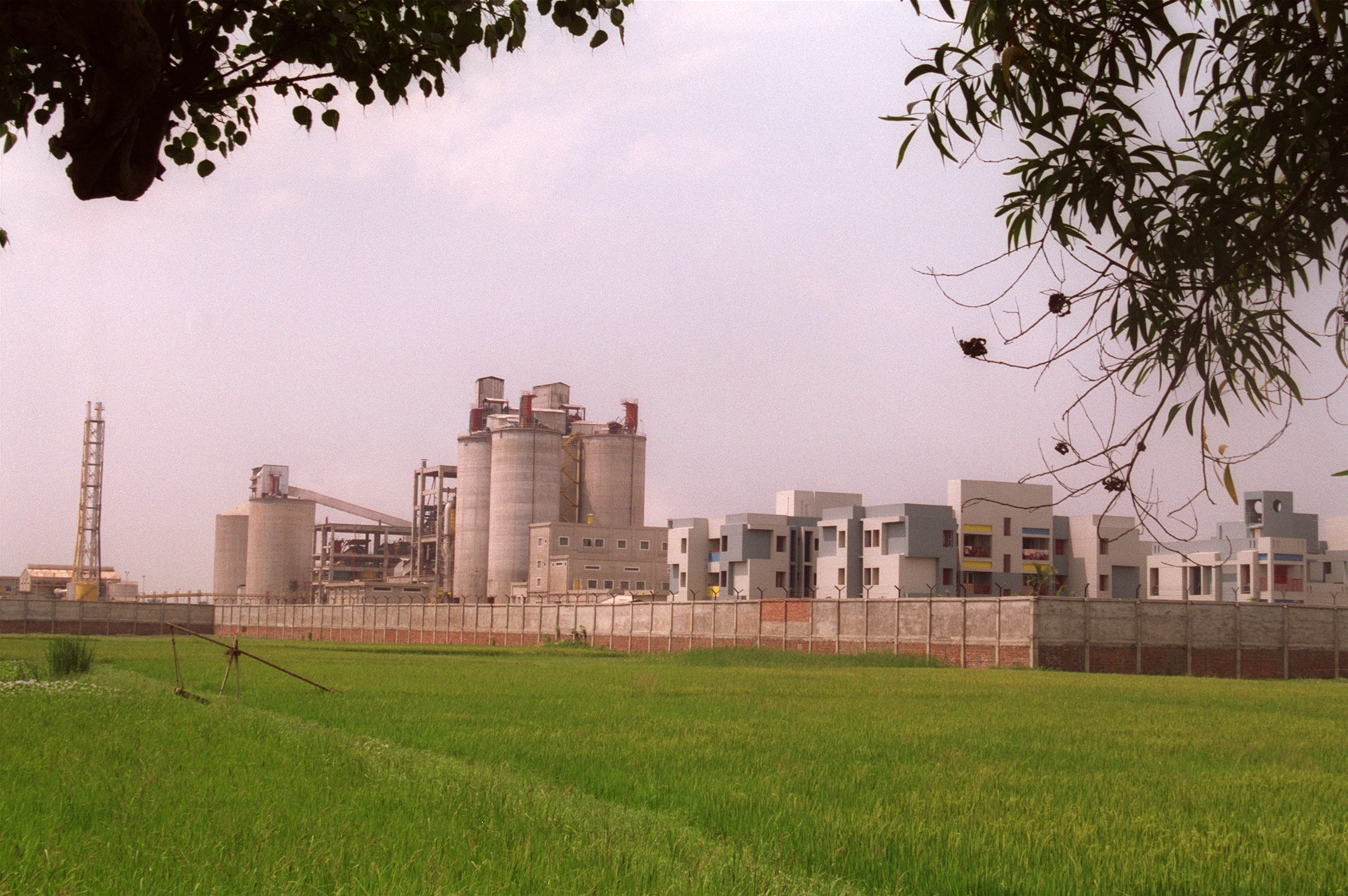
Ambuja Cements grinding unit in Howrah

== See also ==
- Tarachand Ghanshyamdas
