= Seksaria =

Family in India

The Seksarias are a premier industrialist family of India. It is a well recognised and respected family name in the Marwari community in India. The Seksaria family originally came from the district called Sekhsar in Rajasthan, India, hence they chose the family name "Seksaria".

In the early 20th century they were considered as stalwarts in industries like textiles, cotton, rice & oil, banking, real estate, mining, printing, movie production, sugar, steel, commodities and equity markets where their industries and property holdings were spread across the whole country. They were also widely regarded as one of the wealthiest families in the country around this time. An iconic figure in the family, Mr. Govindram Seksaria, was referred to as The Cotton King of the world. The New York Cotton Exchange has erected a ziggurat in his honor inside the office building. Another well known industrialist in the family was Makhanlal Gordhandas Seksaria. The family was also closely associated with the India's Independence Movement with close ties to leading freedom fighters of that time, including Mahatma Gandhi.

For many Indian industrialist families, the Nationalisation Act and the Land Ceiling Act had brought about significant changes in their holdings. However, the Seksaria tradition is still carried on by the current generation of family torchbearers and the 80-Room Seksaria Family Haveli in the Rajasthani village of Navalgarh.

== See also ==
- For a brief account of the family's establishment, you can refer to: https://govindramseksaria.org/
