= Pragati-III Combined Cycle Power Plant =

Gas-fired power plant in Bawana, India

- Country: India
- Location: Bawana, Delhi
- Coordinates: 28°47′41″N 77°4′12″E
- Status: Operational
- Commission date: 2010
- Owner: Pragati Power Corporation Limited

Thermal power station
- Primary fuel: Natural gas
- Combined cycle?: Yes

Power generation
- Units operational: 6 X 250 MW
- Nameplate capacity: 1,500 MW

Pragati-III Combined Cycle Power Plant is a natural gas power plant located in Bawana, Delhi, India. The power plant is one of the gas based power plants of Pragati Power Corporation Limited (PPCL). The source of water for the power plant is treated water from Rithala Sewage Treatment Plant.

== Capacity ==
Pragati Power Station has an installed capacity of 1500 MW and planned capacity of 1500 MW.

Stage	Unit number	Installed capacity (MW)	Date of commissioning	Turbine
1st	1	250	2010 October	Gas
1st	2	250	2011 February	Gas Turbine-2
1st	3	250	2011 October	Steam
1st	4	250	2012 July	Gas Turbine-3
1st	5	250	2014	Gas Tubine-4
1st	6	250	2014	Steam Turbine-2

== See also ==
- Pragati-I Combined Cycle Gas Power Station
