= IPGCL Gas Turbine Power Station =

Defunct power station in Delhi, India

- Country: India
- Location: Delhi
- Coordinates: 28°37′10″N 77°15′01″E
- Status: defunct
- Construction began: 1971
- Owner: Indraprastha Power Generation Company
- Operator: Indraprastha Power Generation Company

Thermal power station
- Primary fuel: Natural gas
- Combined cycle?: Yes

Power generation
- Nameplate capacity: 270 MW

IPGCL Gas Turbine Power Station was a power plant that was located at Delhi. The power plant was one of the gas based power plants of IPGCL. The source of water for the power plant was the Yamuna River.

== Capacity ==
IPGCL Gas Turbine Power Station had an installed capacity of 270 MW. The power plant had nine power generating units.

- Six GT Units of 30 MW each. These units were commissioned during period 1985–86.
- Three ST Unit of 30 MW. These units were commissioned during period 1995–96.

== See also ==
- Indraprastha Power Generation Company
