= Tarachand Ghanshyamdas =

Tarachand Ghanshyamdas was a famous Marwari trading firm that flourished from 1791 to 1957. It is believed to have been responsible to introducing many of now famous Marwari clans from Shekhawati to national and international business field. The grandfathers of both G.D. Birla and Lakshmi Mittal worked for great Tarachand Ghanshyamdas while grandfather of Raja Baldeo Das Birla worked at the great Ganeriwala Firm.

Tarachand Ghanshyamdas in 1870, had offices at Kolkata, Mumbai, Amritsar, the Malwa opium belt of Madhya Pradesh and elsewhere. Another great Marwari firm Sevaram Ramrikhdas, employed the RPG Group patriarch, Rama Prasad Goenka's grandfather's great-grandfather, Ramdutt. The division of Sevaram Ramrikhdas resulted in independent branches of that family at Kanpur, Mirzapur, Farrukhabad and Kolkata; the Singhanias are descendants of the Kanpur branch.

== Rise ==
The firm initially dealt in woolen garments. In the early 19th century many Marwari merchants settled in Calcutta. Opium soon became a major commodity. The records of "Sevaram Ramrikhdas", a Marwari firm based out of Mirzapur in 1830s show opium to have been their major commodity. Tarachand Ghanshyamdas had several branches in the opium tracts of Malwa. Opium sales were Legalized in Hong Kong in 1845 after the British defeated China in the First Opium War. The opium trade was expanded after the Second Opium War in 1860. Calcutta became an important market for opium trading after auctions in Bombay were discontinued in 1830s.

The Poddar family originally hails from Churu in the Shekhawati region of Rajasthan. Around the year 1791 CE, when the local ruler (thakur) of Churu imposed very heavy taxes on the wool trade, a group of Marwadi tradesmen, including ancestors of the Poddar family, left Churu and moved into the domain of neighbouring Raja of Sikar. They created a settlement there and named the village Ramgarh.

The founder or earliest known patriarch of the Poddar family was Bugotee Ram (Bhagwati Ram). He became the treasurer of the nawab of Fatehpur, Rajasthan, a large local landowner. The local term in that region for Treasurer was "Fotedar" or "purse-man". That term mutated first into "pothdar" and then "poddar", and this is the origin of the name by which the family is known.

The Nawab of Fatehpur, although important within his immediate region, ranked far beneath the rulers of the great Rajasthani states such as Jaipur, Jodhpur, Bikaner or Udaipur. Nevertheless, the position of treasurer was one of prestige, and conferred upon men whose personal wealth is so vast that they can bankroll the Nawab's estate on credit. Bugotee Ram must have been both extremely wealthy and good at his job, for he also became a trusted banker to the royal families of Jaipur, Bikaner, and even distant Hyderabad. Bugotee/Bhagwati Ram's son, Chaterbhuj, help a Jain Yati (monk). The Yati inspired him to go to Bhatinda in Punjab where, he was told, his business would prosper. Chaturbhuj duly went and resided in Bhatinda for many years, and also extended his business by opening branches in Amritsar and Hissar.

Until this time, the family kept to their traditional businesses of money-lending and commodity trade, mainly in cotton and grain. It was Chaterbhuj's son, Tarachand, who added the extremely lucrative trade in opium to the family business portfolio. Indeed, it was the opium trade which was the true source of enrichment for the Poddar family, and which magnified their wealth manifold. Their role in the trade was to source poppy/opium from the hinterland and supply the same to Parsi tradesmen who plied the China trade, and to Parsi-owned opium units in Ahmedabad and Surat. Tarachand's son, Ghanshyamdas, was the founder of the trading firm 'Tarachand Ghanshyamdas.'

Tarachand Ghanshyamdas was the greatest Marwari firm during 1860s and 1914 when it rivalled British companies in size. They took deposits, gave loans, engaged in the wholesale trade, transferred money for clients to distant cities, cashed bills of trade, insured shipments, as well as speculated on commodity futures.

== Dissolution ==
After the dissolution of Tarachand Ghanshyamdas, the three brothers Bimal Kumar Poddar (were adopted by his maternal grandfather Janki Prasad Poddar, a partner of Tarachand Ghanshyamdas), Suresh Neotia and Vinod Neotia set up Radhakrishna Bimalkumar in the mid '50s. Shrikumar Poddar another descendant of Tarachand Ghanshyamdas set up the successful Poddar Group ventures in the Americas and Europe. As a leading agent of Burma Shell in India it operated several branches across UP, Bihar and West Bengal.

== The "Great" Firm model ==
Dr. T. Timberg considers Tarachand Ghanshyamdas to be a good example of a "Great" Firm. He suggests the following challenges to the existence of the great firm:

- Decentralisation: Too much intervention by family members and not enough delegation to professional executives.
- Scouting Opportunities: The business group often needs to find businesses for the heirs.
- Succession and continuity: Heirs need to be groomed by the family.
- Routinisation of Charisma: The founder's charisma becomes institutionalised, but the heirs focus on systems.
- Family splits: The splits that need to be managed while preserving the organisation.

The model has been used to explain the decline of the Mughal empire.
