= Indian Institute of Crafts and Design =

Indian Institute of Crafts & Design (IICD)
- Type: Institute of Crafts
- Established: 1997
- Location: Jaipur, Rajasthan, India
- Campus: J-8, Jhalana Institutional Area -302004
- Website: www.iicd.ac.in

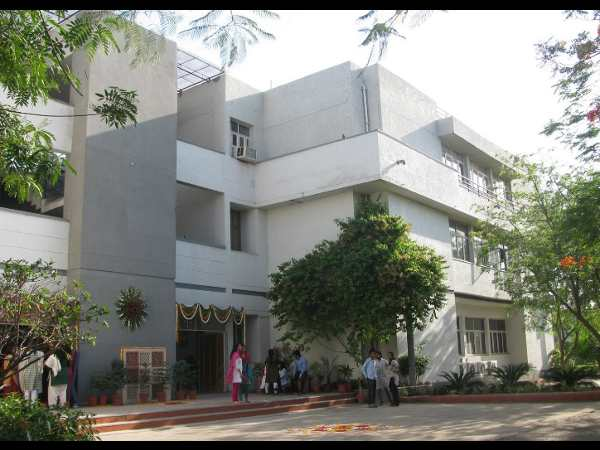
IICD campus

Indian Institute of Crafts & Design (IICD Jaipur) is an academic institution in Jaipur, India, offering undergraduate and postgraduate programs in craft design. The Indian Institute of Crafts and Design is an autonomous institute set up by the Government of Rajasthan and managed by the Ambuja Educational Institute (AEI) under the public-private partnership model.

== Programs ==
IICD's programs are divided by material and design mediums:

- Soft Material Design: textiles, paper, and leather.
- Hard Material Design: wood, metal, and stone.
- Fired Material Design: terracotta, earthenware, stoneware, and porcelain.
- Fashion Clothing Design
- Jewelry Design
- Crafts Communication

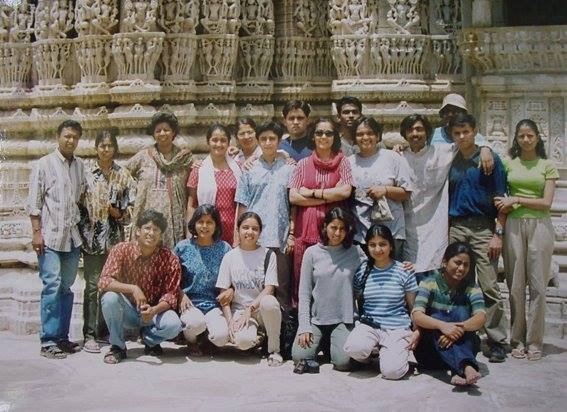
First batch of IICD

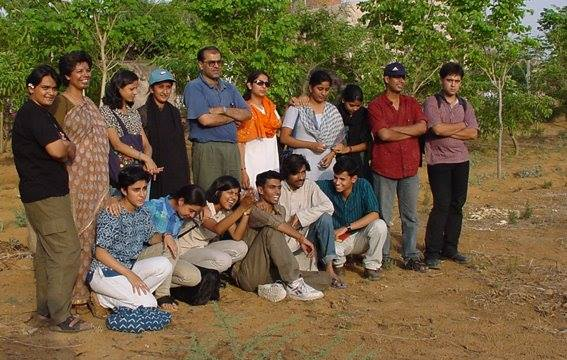
IICD First batch
