= Pragati-I Combined Cycle Gas Power Station =

- Country: India
- Location: Delhi
- Coordinates: 28°47′50″N 77°4′24″E
- Status: Operational
- Owner: Pragati Power Corporation Limited

Thermal power station
- Primary fuel: Natural gas
- Combined cycle?: Yes

Power generation
- Units operational: 2 X 104 MW; 1 X 122 MW
- Nameplate capacity: 330 MW (N)

Pragati-I Combined Cycle Gas Power Station is located in New Delhi. The power plant is one of the gas based power plants of Pragati Power Corporation Limited (PPCL). The gas for it is sourced from GAIL HBJ Pipeline. The source of water is from a sewage treatment plant at Delhi Gate.

== Capacity ==
It has an installed capacity of 330.4 MW.

Unit number	Installed capacity (MW)	Date of commissioning	Turbine
1	104.6	2002	Gas Turbine-1
2	104.6	2002	Gas Turbine-2
3	121.2	2003	Steam Turbine-1

== See also ==
- Pragati-III Combined Cycle Power Plant
