= Marwari people =

Ethnic group from Rajasthan, India

Marwari
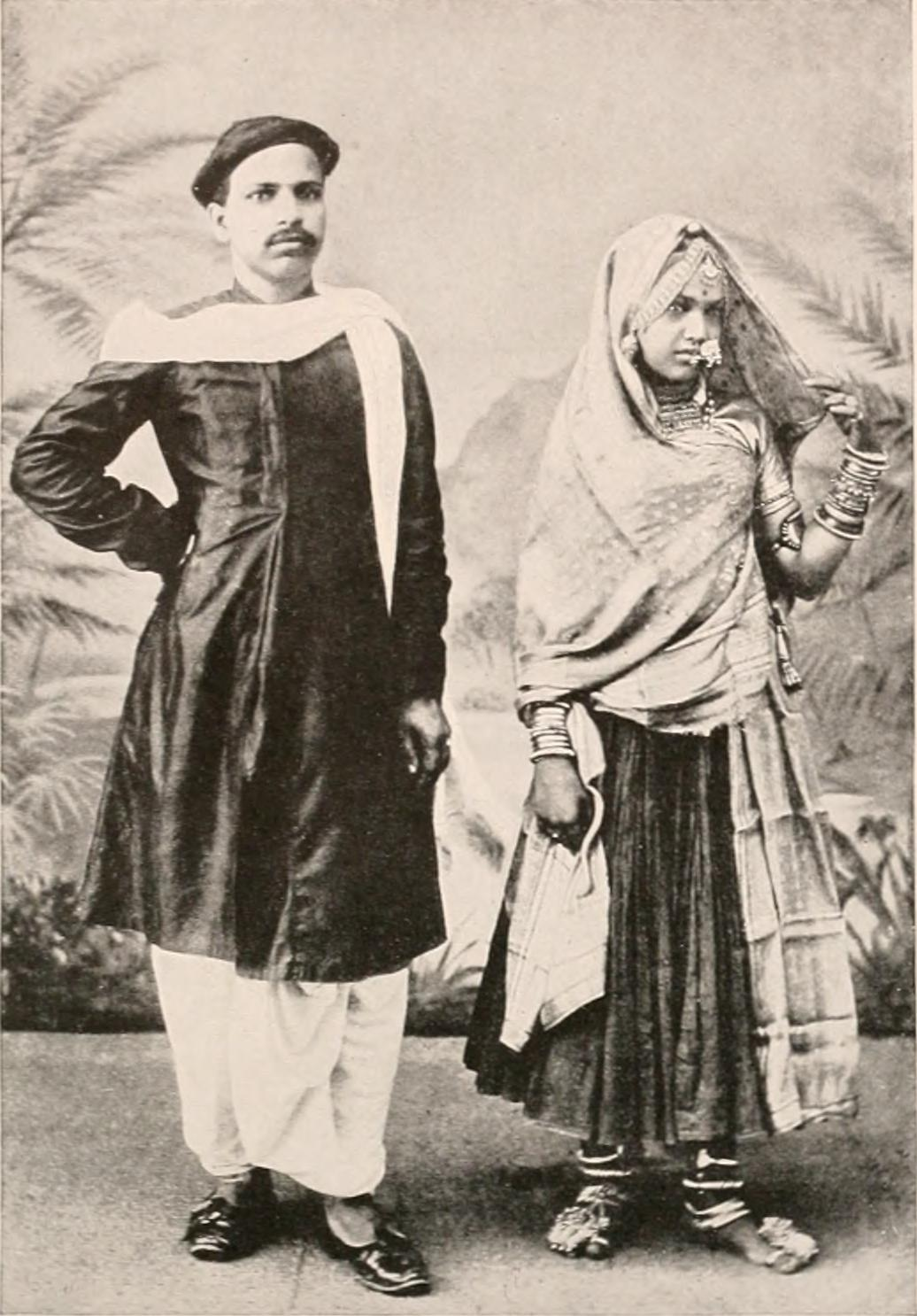
- Marwari husband and wife in traditional attire

Total population
- c. 8 million

Regions with significant populations
- India: 7,800,000
- Pakistan: 500,000
- Nepal: 33,803

Languages
- Marwari, Rajasthani

Religion
- Majority: Hinduism; Minority: Islam; Jainism; Christianity; Buddhism

Related ethnic groups
- Rajasthani people

The Marwari or Marwadi (Devanagari: मारवाड़ी) are an Indo-Aryan ethno-linguistic group that originate from the Marwar region of Rajasthan, India. Their language, also called Marwari, comes under the umbrella of Rajasthani languages, which is part of the Western Zone of Indo-Aryan languages. Whilst most Marwaris live within India, they have sizeable presence in the neighbouring countries of Pakistan and Nepal.

== Etymology ==
The term Marwari once referred to the area encompassed by the former princely state of Marwar, also called the Jodhpur region of southwest Rajasthan in India. It formed from the two constituent words, Maru (region of Thar Desert) and Wadi (enclosure), effectively indicating the western part of modern day Rajasthan. It has evolved to be a designation for the Rajasthani people in general but it is used particularly with reference to certain jātis that fall within the Bania community. The most prominent among these communities are the Agrawals, Khandelwals, Maheshwaris and Oswals. It is possible that the association of the Marwari term with Jodhpur owes more to the high status of that place in pre-independence India.

Dwijendra Tripathi believes that the term Marwari was probably used by the traders only when they were outside their home region; that is, by the diaspora. Anne Hardgrove also supports this argument, saying that the Marwari identity could only exist in the context of a diaspora who came from somewhere and that until they migrated they had no such designation.

== History ==
=== Early origins ===
Marwari traders have historically been migratory in habit. The possible causes of this trait include the proximity of their homeland to the major Ganges - Yamuna trade route; movement to escape famine; and the encouragement given to them by various rulers of northern India who saw advantages in having their skills in banking and finance.

The pattern of Marwari migration became increasingly divergent following the decline in wars between Rajput kingdoms, which the Marwaris had helped to finance, and the decreasing influence of the community over the North Indian caravan trading routes that resulted from the British establishing themselves in the region. The changed focus of migration was also encouraged by the British, who established or patronised new trading routes and centres, as well as by the decline in the political significance of the Rajput courts whose famed conspicuous consumption had been supported by Marwari money. The community welcomed the relative safety that the British presence offered, as well as the commercial and legal frameworks that they provided and which were more favourable to Marwari activities than the systems prevalent during the earlier period of Mughal and Rajput rule.

The Marwari Jagat Seth family served as banker to the Nawab of Bengal.

=== British era ===
After the decline of Mughal authority, Marwari traders, bankers and financiers migrated to the growing British power in Calcutta. There were particularly significant population shifts to Bombay between 1835-1850 and Kolkata from the 1870s, as well as to Madras.

Historian Medha M. Kudaisya has said that the Marwaris:

made the transition from being niche players in trading to becoming industrial conglomerates ... From being brokers and bankers, the Marwaris went on to break the British monopoly over the jute industry after World War I; they then moved into other industrial sectors, such as cotton and sugar, and set up diversified conglomerates. By the 1950s, the Marwaris dominated the India private industry scenario, emerging as the establishers of its most prominent business houses.

A considerable number of Marwari business groups made their fortune on speculative markets in the nineteenth and early twentieth century.

Although maintaining close and public ties with the British authorities, members of the Marwari business community were early financial supporters of the Indian National Congress, often in secret.

=== Independent India ===
In 1956, the All-India Marwari Federation opposed a linguistic organisation of states while buying up regional language newspapers in Maharashtra, Tamil Nadu and Andhra Pradesh. Today, they control many of the country's largest media groups.

The community's influence over the Indian economy declined following the country's 1991 economic reforms. From a peak of controlling 24 per cent of economic activity in 1990, it had fallen to less than 2 per cent in 2000. This reflects the growth of new industries outside of commodities trading and primary production. The figure for 2000 is considered to be lower than the position in 1939, when the community first began its resurgence.

== Language ==
Marwari, or Marrubhasha, as it is referred to by Marwaris, is the traditional historical language of the Marwaris. The Marwari language is closely related to the Rajasthani language. The latter evolved from the Old Gujarati (also called Old Western Rajasthani, Gujjar Bhakha or Maru-Gurjar) language spoken by the people in Gujarat and Rajasthan. It has been noted that throughout the state of Rajasthan, people avoid identifying their language by name, preferring to identify themselves as speaking "Rajasthani" with Marwari literature being taught as Rajasthani until secondary level.

== Culture ==
Marwaris have been known for a tightly knit social solidarity, described by Selig Harrison in 1960 as "indissoluble under the impact of the strongest regional solvents". According to Hardgrove, "The main duty for Marwari women, it would seem, is to provide a stable household life for their husbands, sons and brothers-in-law", although she acknowledges that some such women have in recent years been attempting to carve out roles in the wider world through engagement in charitable ventures and even running their own businesses.

== Demographics outside India ==
=== Pakistan ===
Following the 1947 partition, many Marwari Muslims moved to the new state of Pakistan, mainly in Karachi with some in southern Punjab, and as of 2007 their numbers were estimated at around 500,000 in the country.

The Ghazdarabad neighbourhood of Karachi has a Marwari Muslim majority, numbering around 20,000 and having mostly moved from Jaisalmer in Rajasthan after the partition and earlier in the 19th century as well.

=== Nepal ===
The Central Bureau of Statistics of Nepal classifies the Marwaris (called Marwadis in the Nepal census) as a subgroup within the broader social group of "Indian Nepalis". At the time of the Nepal census of 2011, 51,443 people (0.2% of the population of Nepal) were Marwadi. The frequency of Marwadis by province was as follows:

- Koshi Province (0.4%)
- Bagmati Province (0.3%)
- Madhesh Province (0.2%)
- Lumbini Province (0.1%)
- Gandaki Province (0.0%)
- Karnali Province (0.0%)
- Sudurpashchim Province (0.0%)

The frequency of Marwadis was higher than national average (0.2%) in the following districts:

- Morang (1.0%)
- Parsa (0.9%)
- Kathmandu (0.8%)
- Sunsari (0.6%)
- Jhapa (0.5%)
- Banke (0.3%)
- Kapilvastu (0.3%)
- Sarlahi (0.3%)

== Notable people ==
- Anil Agarwal
- Ritesh Agarwal
- Nidhhi Agerwal
- Janaki Devi Bajaj
- Rahul Bajaj
- Benu Gopal Bangur
- Sooraj Barjatya
- Tarachand Barjatya
- Shobhana Bhartia
- Aditya Vikram Birla
- Kumar Mangalam Birla
- Om Birla
- Kishore Biyani
- Binod Chaudhary
- Ritu Dalmia
- Jagmohan Dalmiya
- Radhakishan Damani
- Harsh Goenka
- R. P. Goenka
- S. N. Goenka
- Abhishek Jain
- Ravi Jaipuria
- Shyamanand Jalan
- Rakesh Jhunjhunwala
- Savitri Jindal
- Rajeev Khandelwal
- Rohit Khandelwal
- Mangal Lodha
- Shailesh Lodha, actor, writer and poet
- Shantanu Maheshwari.
- Smriti Mandhana
- Lakshmi Mittal
- Palak Muchhal
- Hanuman Prasad Poddar
- Shashi and Ravi Ruia
- Kiku Sharda
- Lala Kamlapat Singhania
- Abhishek Singhvi
- Ashok Kumar Singhvi
- Laxmi Mall Singhvi
- Liaquat Soldier, Pakistani comedy actor, writer and director.
- Vijay Varma

== See also ==
- Tarachand Ghanshyamdas
- Kingdom of Marwar
- Marwari horse
