= ACC (company) =

Indian cement manufacturing company private limited

ACC Limited
- Trade name: ACC
- Formerly: The Associated Cement Companies Limited (1936–2006)
- Type: Public
- Traded as: BSE: 500410; NSE: ACC
- Industry: Building materials
- Founded: 1 August 1936; 90 years ago
- Headquarters: Mumbai, Maharashtra, India
- Key people: Karan Adani (chairman); Ajay Kapur (MD & CEO)
- Products: Cement
- Revenue: ▲₹22,834 crore (US$2.4 billion) (2025)
- Operating income: ▲₹3,024 crore (US$310 million) (2025)
- Net income: ▲₹2,402 crore (US$250 million) (2025)
- Total assets: ▲₹25,412 crore (US$2.6 billion) (2025)
- Total equity: ▲₹18,558 crore (US$1.9 billion) (2025)
- Owner: Adani Group (56.69%)
- Number of employees: 3,171 (2025)
- Parent: Adani Group
- Website: www.acclimited.com
- Footnotes; Financials as of 31 March 2025.

ACC Limited (formerly The Associated Cement Companies Limited) is an Indian cement producer, headquartered in Mumbai. It is a subsidiary of Ambuja Cements and a part of the Adani Group. On 1 September 2006, its name was changed to ACC Limited. The company was established in Mumbai, Maharashtra on 1 August 1936.

== History ==
In 1936, eleven cement companies belonging to Tata, Khatau, Killick Nixon and Seth Edulji Dinshaw groups merged to form a single entity, The Associated Cement Companies. Nowroji Saklatvala was the first chairman of ACC. The first board of directors had some prominent industrialists—JRD Tata, Ambalal Sarabhai, Walchand Hirachand, Dharamsey Khatau, Akbar Hydari, Mir Yousuf Ali Khan, Salar Jung III and Homi Mody.

The companies that were merged were:

- The Indian Cement Co. Ltd.
- The Katni Cement and Industrial Co. Ltd.
- Budhi Portland Cement Ltd.
- The Okha Cement Co. Ltd.
- The Gwalior Cement Company Ltd.
- The Punjab Portland Cement
- The United Cement Co. Ltd.
- The Shahabad Cement Co. Ltd.
- The Coimbatore Cement
- The Dewarkhand Cement Co. Ltd.
- The C. P. Cement Co. Ltd.

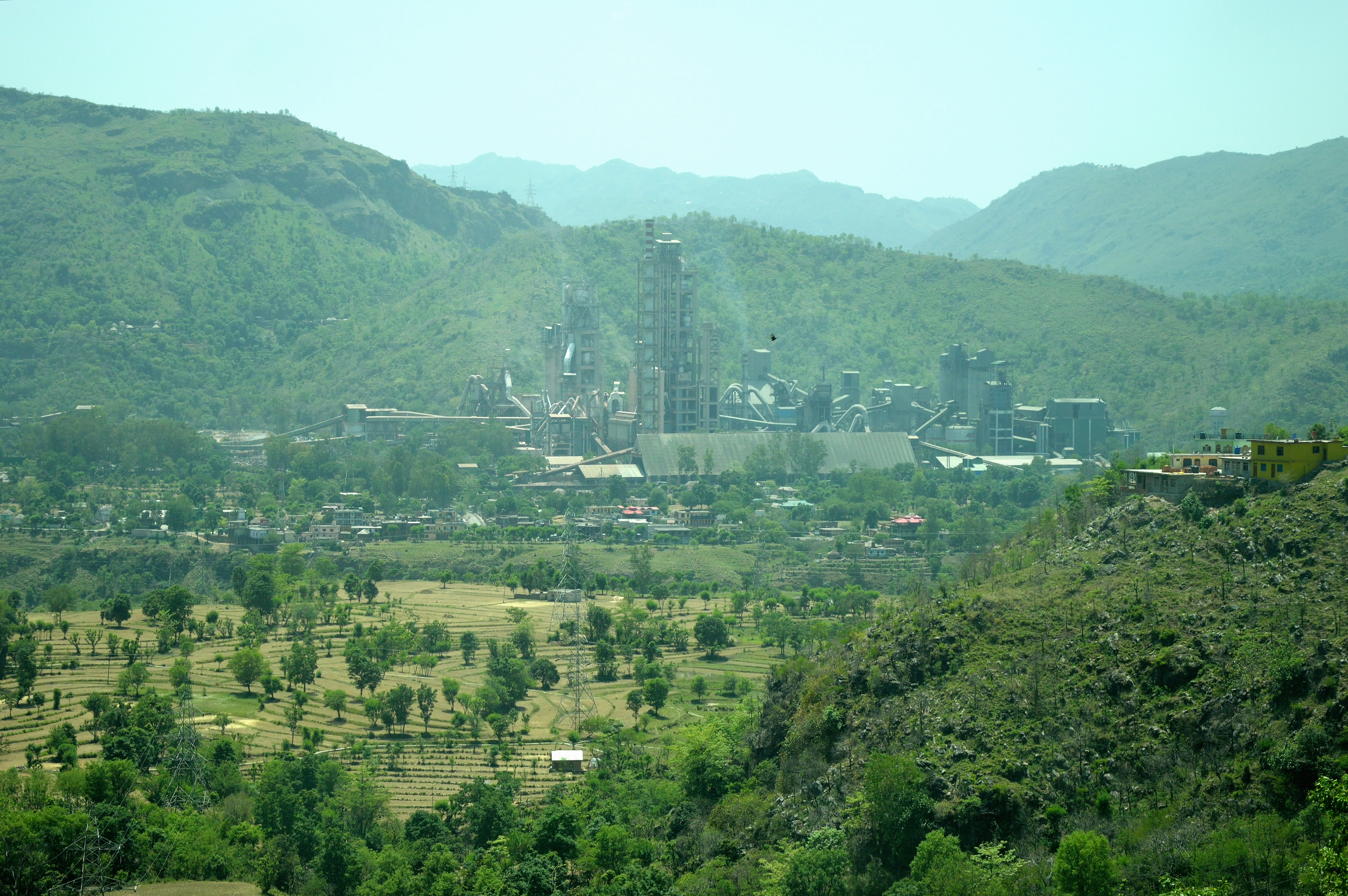
The Gagal Cement Works of ACC Limited at Barmana, Himachal Pradesh

The management control of the company was taken over by Swiss cement manufacturer Holcim Group in 2004. ACC operated as a subsidiary of Lafarge Holcim. On 1 September 2006, the name of the Associated Cement Companies Limited was changed to ACC Limited.

On 14 April 2022, Holcim announced that it would exit from the Indian market after 17 years of operations as part of a strategy to focus on core markets and listed its stakes in ACC and Ambuja Cements for sale.

On 15 May 2022, Adani Group acquired Holcim's stake in ACC and Ambuja Cements for US$10.5 billion.

== See also ==
- Associated Cement Company cricket team
