= Delhi Transco Limited =

Delhi Transco Limited (DTL)
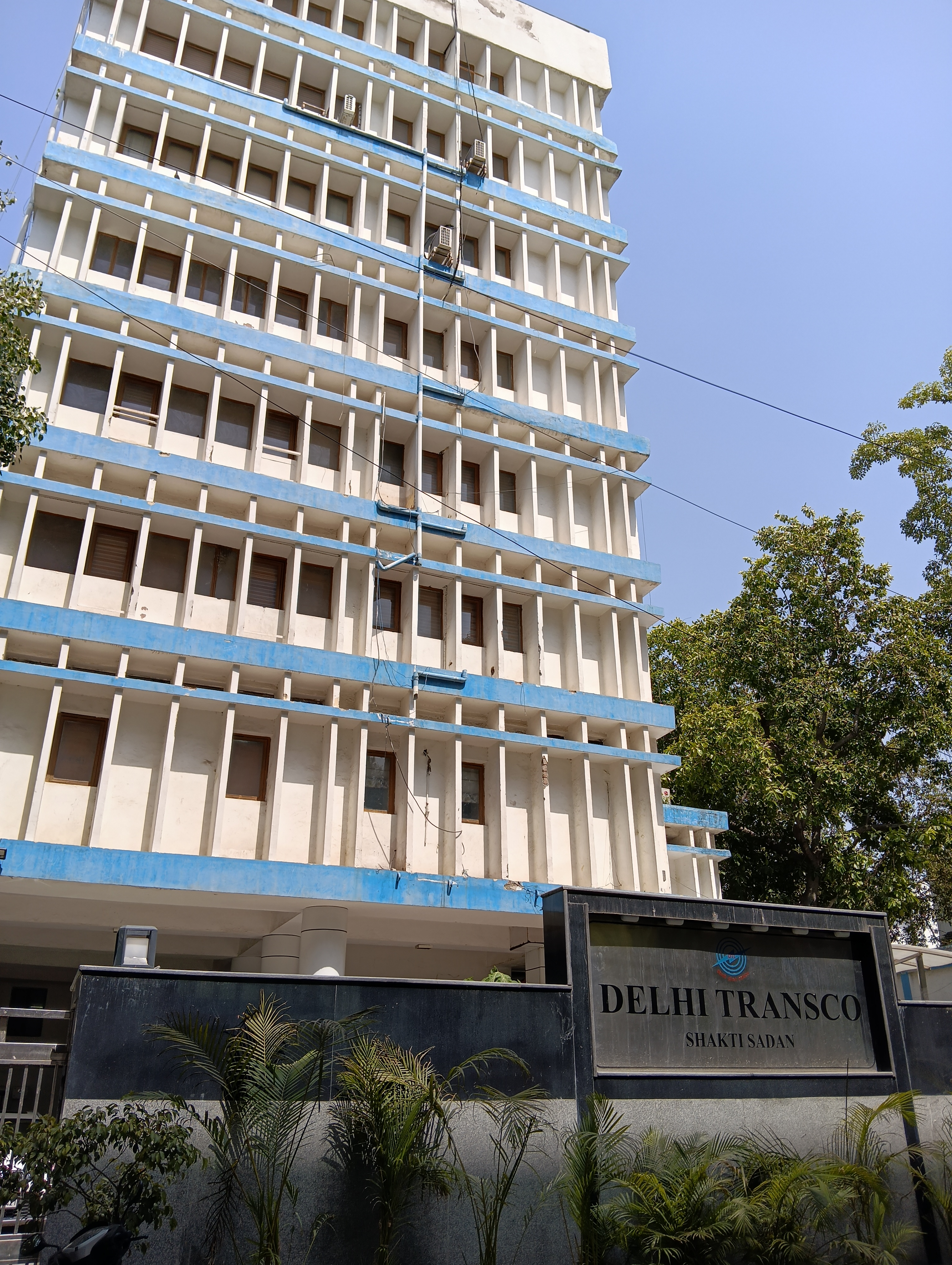
- Type: Government-owned Corporation-PSU
- Industry: Electricity transmission
- Founded: 1 July 2002
- Headquarters: Shakti Sadan, Kotla Marg, New Delhi, India
- Key people: Padmini Singla (IAS) (Chairman & MD); Mukesh Kr Sharma (Director – Operations); Prafulla Mallik (Company Secretary)
- Products: Electricity
- Website: http://dtl.gov.in

Delhi Transco Limited (DTL), formerly Delhi Power Supply Company Limited (DPSCL) is the State Transmission Utility for the National Capital Territory of Delhi. It is responsible for the transmission of power at 220 kV and 400 kV level and for upgrading, operating and maintaining the high voltage network.

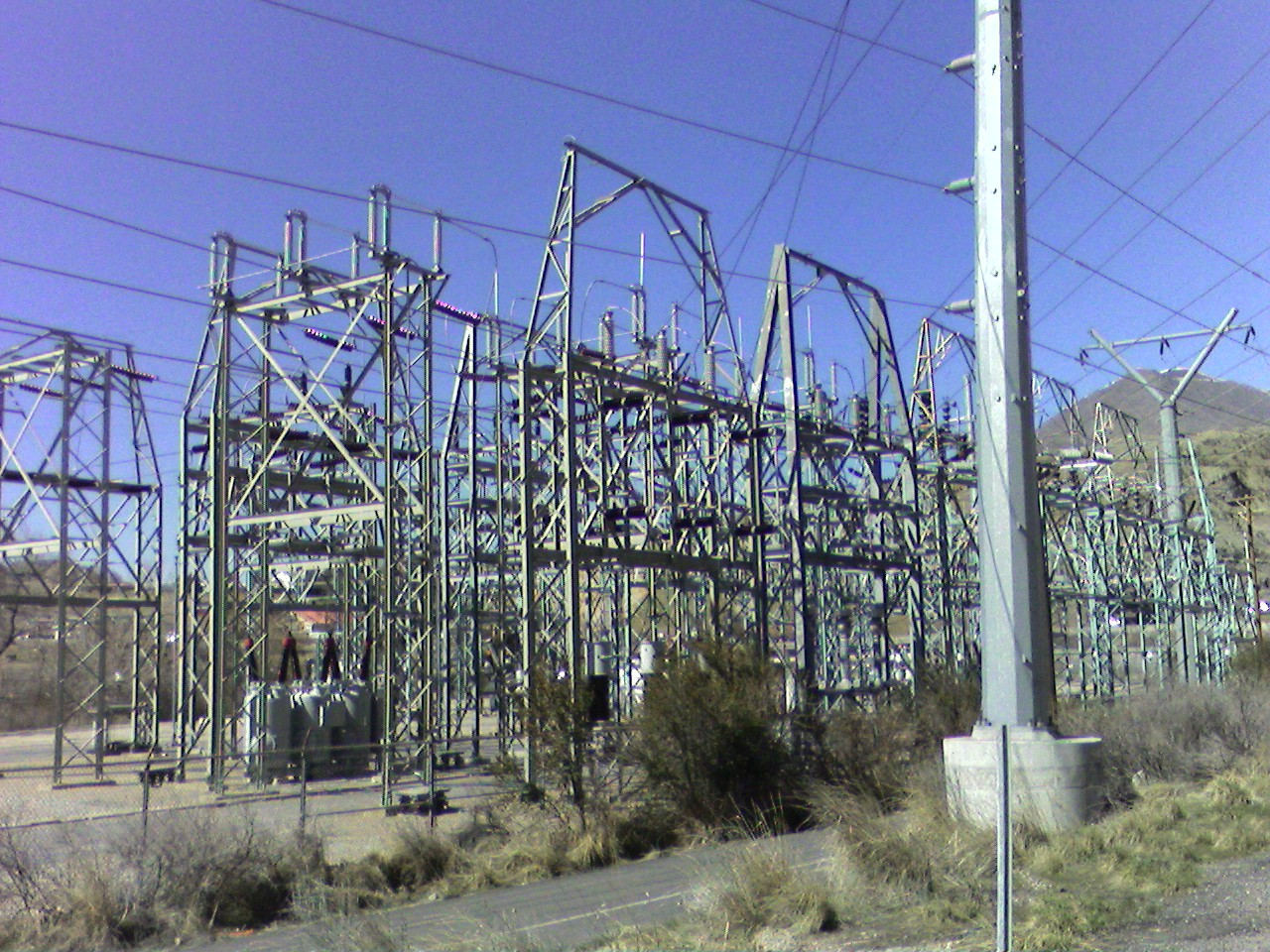
A transmission substation increase the voltage of electricity coming in to allow it for long-distance transmission.

== History of Electricity in Delhi ==
The position is that as per available records, the first diesel Power Station was established in Delhi in the year 1905 when a private English Company by name M/s. John Fleming was given permission to generate electricity under the provisions of the Indian Electricity Act 1903. The above-mentioned Company was given the responsibility both of generation and distribution of power in a limited manner. That Company after obtaining license under the provisions of Electricity Act 1903 had set up a small 2 MW Diesel set at Lahori Gate in Old Delhi. Later on, this very Company was converted as Delhi Electricity Supply and Traction Company. In the Year 1911, the power generation was augmented by Steam Generation Station. In the year 1932, the management of Central Power House was handed over to New Delhi Municipal Committee (NDMC). In the field of power generation and distribution, a major break through was achieved in 1939 when Delhi Central Electricity Power Authority (DCEPA) was established. This company was responsible for the supply of power to the areas covered by Local Bodies, namely, the Municipal Committees of Delhi, West Delhi and South Delhi, the Notified Area Committees of Red Fort, Civil Lines, Mehrauli, Najafgarh, and the District Board of Delhi. The supply of electricity to the Municipal Committees of Delhi-Shahdara and the Notified Area of Narela was done by different private agencies. In 1947 DCEPA took over a Private Limited Company by name Delhi electric Supply & traction Company Limited.

== Formation of Delhi State Electricity Board (DSEB) ==
In the year 1951 the Delhi State Electricity Board (DSEB) came into existence and the responsibility of generation and distribution of electricity was taken over by DSEB from DCEPA.

== Formation of Delhi Electric Supply Undertaking (DESU) ==
After the promulgation of the Delhi Municipal Corporation Act 1957, the DSEB was dissolved and the functions of DSEB were taken over by Delhi Electric Supply Undertaking (DESU), which came into existence in 1958. After the formation DESU, the generation and distribution of electricity to all the areas of Delhi came under DESU.

== Formation of Delhi Vidyut Board (DVB) ==
The Government of the National Capital Territory of Delhi vide notification No. F.11 (10)/92-LSG /PF (II) dated 24.02.1997, issued under the Electricity (Supply) Act, 1948, constituted a separate Electricity Board, i.e. the Delhi Vidyut Board (DVB) for the NCT of Delhi w.e.f. 24.02.1997 for the purpose of generation and distribution of power to the entire area of NCT of Delhi except the areas falling within the jurisdiction of NDMC and Delhi Cantonment Board.

== Unbundling of Delhi Vidyut Board (DVB) ==
The Delhi Vidyut Board (DVB) was a State Electricity Board set up in 1997 under the Electricity (Supply) Act, 1948, succeeding the Delhi Electricity Supply Undertaking (DESU) which has existed since 1957 as a wing of the Municipal Corporation of Delhi. It was an integrated utility with the generation, transmission, and distribution functions serving all of Delhi except the NDMC and MES (Cantonment) areas to which it supplied power in bulk.

The creation of DVB, replacing DESU, in 1997 proved to be merely a change in the legal status of the organization and was not followed by any real change in its structure, functioning, and work culture. Its reputation continued to deteriorate and its poor commercial performance, the best-known thing about DVB perhaps being its high Transmission and Distribution (T&D) losses made it a drain on the public exchequer. Further, failure in raising the resources necessary for the improvement of its services made matters critical. There were unprecedented, widespread expressions of public discontent during the difficult summer of 1998.

In December 1998 when the Government came to power in Delhi, the power situation was grim. With T & D losses as high as 50% regular power cut for 10 to 15 hours and Delhi Vidyut Board accumulating liabilities of over Rs. 23,000 crores, Delhi Government had to come up with a fast and viable alternative.

Delhi Electricity Board Regulatory Commission (DERC) was constituted in May 1999 whose prime responsibility was to look into the entire gamut of existing activity and search for various ways of power sector reforms. The DERC is even today a fully functional body that has since issued tariff orders for annual revenue requirements. Delhi Electricity Reform Ordinance, 2000 was a body that was promulgated in October 2000 and notified in the form of an Act in March 2001. It mainly provides for the constitution of an Electricity Regulatory Commission, unbundling of DVB into separate generation, transmission, and distribution companies, and increasing avenues for the participation of the private sector.

This was followed by a Tripartite Agreement which was signed by the Government of Delhi, DVB employees to ensure the cooperation of stakeholders in this reform process.

Next, a two-stage competitive bidding process of Request for Qualification (RFQ) and Request for Proposal (RFP) was set into motion for the privatization of the distribution companies.

The bidders were selected on the basis of reduction of total Aggregate Technical and Commercial losses (AT & C) a unique feature of the power sector reforms in Delhi. The bidders were required to bid on the basis of efficiency improvement like the reduction of AT & C losses that they achieve year-wise over a period of five years.

== Formation of Delhi Transco Limited (DTL) ==
On 1 July 2002, The Delhi Vidyut Board (DVB) was unbundled into six successor companies: Delhi Power Supply Company Limited (DPCL)- Holding Company; Delhi Transco Limited (DTL) – TRANSCO; Indraprastha Power Generation Company Limited (IPGCL) – GENCO; BSES Rajdhani Power Limited (BRPL) – DISCOM; BSES Yamuna Power Limited (BYPL) – DISCOM; North Delhi Power Limited (NDPL) – DISCOM.

The Government handed over the management of the business of electricity distribution to three private companies BRPL, BYPL and NDPL since 1 July 2002 with 51% equity with the private sector.(DVB itself was the successor entity to the Delhi Electricity Supply Undertaking (DESU).

Of these five companies, BRPL, BYPL and NDPL are joint ventures between the Delhi Government and the private sector which handle the power distribution sector in Delhi. BRPL is responsible for distribution of power in Central, South and West Delhi. BYPL handles power distribution in East Delhi (Trans-Yamuna). NDPL distributes power in North and North-West Delhi. The remaining two companies, DTL and IPGCL, are wholly owned by the Delhi Government. Delhi Transco Limited is a 'State Transmission Utility of the National Capital of Delhi', whereas IPGCL is responsible for power generation.

== Transmission Network of DTL ==
=== Existing Transmission Network ===
The existing network of DTL consists of a 400 kV ring around the periphery of Delhi interlinked with the 220 kV network spread all over the city. A summary of the Transmission of DTL is given below.

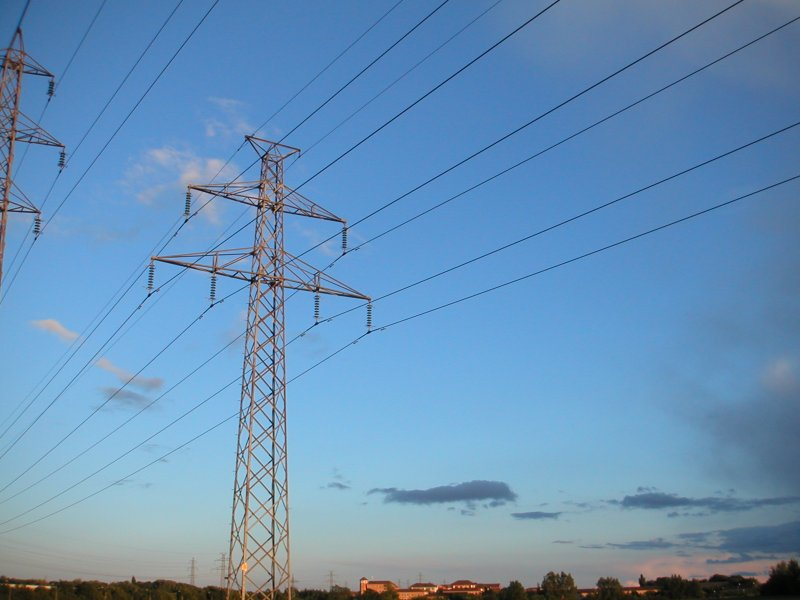
Transmission lines

Parameters	400 kV Level	220 kV Level
No. of Substations	4	41
Transmission Capacity (in MVA)	5410	12820
Transmission Lines (length in Ckt. km.)	249	850

=== List of Substations ===
400 kV Substations
400 kV (AIS) Substations	400 kV Gas Insulated (GIS) Substations
Bawana, Tikri Kalan (Mundka), Bamnauli	Harsh Vihar

220 kV Substations
220 kV (AIS) Substations	220 kV Gas Insulated (GIS) Substations
Narela, Rohini-I, Najafgarh, Sarita Vihar	DIAL, Electric Lane, Kashmere Gate, Lodhi Road
Mehrauli, Vasant Kunj, Pappankalan-I, Rajghat	Maharani Bagh, Park Street, Peeragarhi, RK Puram
Geeta Colony, Pragati, IP Estate, Gazipur	Preet Vihar, Ridge Valley, Subzi Mandi, AIIMS
Rohini-II, Patparganj, South of Wazirabad	Wazirpur, Tughlaqabad, Dwarka, SGTN
Okhla, Naraina, DSIDC Bawana, Gopalpur, BTPS
Pappankalan-II, Shalimar Bagh, Kanjhwala, PPK-III	

== Power Arrangements of Delhi ==
DTL had been arranging power from various sources for all the five distribution licensees since 1 July 2002. Keeping in mind the Commonwealth Games 2010 it had signed power purchase agreements for more than 9000 MW of power. This arrangement continued till 31 March 2007. From 1 April 2007 onwards all the distribution agencies are directly purchasing power and all the long and short term Power Purchase Agreements have been transferred to these agencies by Delhi Electricity Regulatory Commission (DERC) on the basis of their consumption. Now it is the responsibility of the distribution companies to arrange power for their respective areas. However a Power Procurement Group has been formed to coordinate the procurement and sale of power which is headed by a DTL Officer. Now DTL is responsible only for efficient transmission of power.

=== Power Generating Stations ===
There are total four Power Plants of Delhi Government Owned Inderprastha Power Generation Company Limited Details are as under .

There is one Central Sector Power Generation Plant owned by NTPC at Badarpur.

Station	Gas Turbine Power Station	Pragati Power Station
Generation Sector	State	State
Station Capacity	330 MW (Total 994.5 MW)	720 MW (Derated 705 MW)
Units Size	6x30 MW (GT) 3x30 MW (WHRU)	2x104 MW (GT) 1x122 MW (WHRU)
Year of Commissioning	1986 & 1996	2002 -03
Coal Fields/Gas	GAIL HBJ Pipeline	GAIL HBJ Pipeline
Water Sources	River Yamuna	Treated water
Beneficiary Areas	NDMC-VVIP, DMRC	NDMC, South Delhi

Abbreviations

WHRU – Waste Heat Recovery Unit

GT – Gas Turbine

== Power Supply Position of Delhi Over the Years ==
There has been considerable improvement in the power supply position at the end of five years of restructuring of power sector of Delhi. The peak demand is increasing every year while the load shedding has reduced tremendously.

Parameters	2008–09	2009–10	2010–11	2011–12	2012–13	2013–14	2014–15	2015–16	2016–17	2017–18
Peak Demand met in MW	4034	4408	4720	5028	5642	5653	5925	5846	6261	6526
Energy consumption in MUs	22006	23349	24419	25349	25921	28031	28965	29415	30797	31817
Shedding, in MUs	128	185	72.49	82.98	138.08	77.04	116.87	42.17	31.50	19.46
Shedding as %age of Energy Consumption	0.58%	0.80%	0.30%	0.32%	0.49%	0.27%	0.40%	0.14%	0.102%	0.06%

== Revenue Statistics ==
DTL has achieved a commendable financial turnaround after a four-year financial engineering process. It has posted profits in each of the past four years. DTL is one of the few entities of Government of NCT Delhi, which is earning profit and paying dividends to the Government. It has been accredited A* rating company by the top rating agencies of the country i.e. CRISIL and Flich Rating India Ltd. This is the highest among all state transmission utilities in the country.

Key Statistics.

Year	2010–11	2011–12	2012–13	2013–14	2014–15	2015–16
Profit after tax (INR Billions)	1.34	7.59	2.61	1.99	3.24	4.39

== Transmission Load Forecast for 11th Plan ==
As per the projections made by Central Electricity Authority in its 17th EPS report and the recommendations for the transmission requirements for Delhi systems in the 11th Plan System Studies report of Central Electricity Authority for the period 2007–2012.

Transmission Load Forecast for Delhi

As per Statistics published on DTL's website.

Year	2008–09 (MW)	2009–10 (MW)	2010–11 (MW)	2011–12 (MW)
Anticipated Demand as per 17th Electric Power Survey of CEA	4877	5253	5657	6092
Anticipated Demand calculated as per CEA's Grid Monitoring Methodology on the basis of previous years Data	4034	4425	4626	4837
Anticipated Demand calculated as per the Trend of Actual of last 10 years	4034	4255	4489	4735

Anticipated Demand as per 17th Electric Power survey (MW)

The year wise anticipated demand of Delhi as per 17th Electric Power survey of CEA is indicated in the above-mentioned table from which it is evident that there is a 7 to 8% increase yearly in the demand of power in Delhi during 2008–12.

== Care for Environment ==
DTL operates its obligations in a clean, green pollution free environment and, has been providing more green coverage to the National Capital. It is spreading awareness among the masses to use eco-friendly electrical appliances. DTL is also introducing Energy Conservation Building Code in Delhi to maximize the use of natural resources and minimize the use, of electricity. Its proposed corporate office at 400 kV Sub Station Maharani Bagh will be a Green Building. The building is aimed to be a Platinum Rated Green Building. More than one lac sq meter land has been earmarked for plantation in the ensuing year.

== Electricity Consumers Grievance Handling System ==
Department of Power, Government of NCT of Delhi has established Public Grievance Cell http://www.biljipgr.gov.in to look into the complaints of electricity consumers. DTL has helped establish and continue to run the Public Grievance Cell.

== See also ==
- Delhi Vidyut Board
