= Sasaram back-to-back HVDC converter station =

Location
- Country: India
- State: Bihar
- Coordinates: 25°07′42″N 83°42′29″E
- From: Eastern Region
- To: Northern Region

Ownership information
- Owner: Power Grid Corporation of India

Construction information
- Substation installer: Alstom
- Commissioned: 2002

Technical information
- Type: Back to Back
- Current type: HVDC
- Total length: 0 km (0 mi)
- Capacity: 500 MW
- DC voltage: 205 kV
- No. of poles: 1

The Sasaram back-to-back HVDC station is a back-to-back HVDC connection between the eastern and northern regions in India, located close to the city of Sasaram, in Bihar state in northeastern India. The station is owned by Power Grid Corporation of India.

The converter station consists of one pole with a nominal power transmission rating of 500 MW. The converter station was built by Alstom between 1999 and 2002 and has nominal DC voltage and current ratings of 205 kV and 2475 A. The design is very similar to that of the Chandrapur and Vizag 1 converter stations, also built for Power Grid.

In 2006, the Eastern and Northern regions were made part of the combined NEW grid. As a result, the converter station is no longer required for its original purpose of asynchronously linking the Eastern and Northern grids, although it can still be used as an embedded power flow device to help control power flow within the AC system. The converter station could potentially be shifted to elsewhere to export/import power from other countries.

== Sites ==
| Site | Coordinates |
|---|---|
| Sasaram Back to Back | 25°07′42″N 83°42′29″E |

== See also ==
- PGCIL
