= Chandrapur–Padghe HVDC transmission system =

HVDC connection in Maharashtra, India

Location
- Country: India
- State: Maharashtra
- Coordinates: 20°00′36″N 79°17′06″E; 19°21′26″N 73°11′18″E
- From: Chandrapur
- To: Padghe, near Mumbai

Ownership information
- Owner: Maharashtra State Electricity Board

Construction information
- Substation installer: ABB, Bharat Heavy Electricals Limited
- Commissioned: 1999

Technical information
- Type: overhead line
- Current type: HVDC
- Total length: 752 km (467 mi)
- Capacity: 1,500 MW
- DC voltage: ±500 kV
- No. of poles: 2

The Chandrapur–Padghe HVDC transmission system is an HVDC connection between Chandrapur and Padghe (near Mumbai) in the state of Maharashtra in India, which was put into service in 1999.

It connects the coal-fired Chandrapur Super Thermal Power Station to the major load centre of Mumbai. The project has a 752 kilometres (467 mi) long bipolar overhead line. The transmission voltage is ±500 kV and the maximum transmission power is 1,500 megawatts. The scheme uses thyristor valves, arranged in a single twelve pulse bridge per pole. The project was built by ABB and BHEL, and is owned by Maharashtra State Electricity Board (MSEB).

The eastern (Chandrapur) converter station is located 20 kilometres (12 mi) from the Chandrapur back to back HVDC station. The close proximity of the two converter stations meant that the control systems needed to be carefully coordinated, a task made more challenging by the fact that the two stations were built by different manufacturers. To address this problem a series of joint simulation studies, involving the control equipment from both converter stations connected to a common simulator, was performed.

== Sites ==
Site	Coordinates
Chandrapur converter station	20°00′36″N 79°17′06″E
Padghe converter station	19°21′26″N 73°11′18″E

== See also ==
- High-voltage direct current
- Chandrapur back to back HVDC converter station
