= CPW =

CPW may refer to:

- Camp Project Wales, a youth project for disadvantaged children run by the United Reformed Church in the 1970s and 1980s
- Carphone Warehouse, a mobile phone retailer based in London, England
- Central Park West, an avenue in Manhattan, New York, US
- Central Park West (TV series), a 1990s American television drama
- Central Plains Water, an irrigation proposal for Canterbury, New Zealand
- Center for Photography at Woodstock, an arts organization in Kingston, New York, US
- Chepstow railway station (station code: CPW), a railway station in Monmouthshire, Wales
- Choti Padoli railway station (station code: CPW), a railway station in Maharashtra, India
- Commercial Processing Workload, a server benchmarking tool from IBM
- Colorado Parks and Wildlife, a division of the Colorado Department of Natural Resources
- Coplanar waveguide, a type of printed electrical transmission line
- Cumberland Plain Woodland, an ecological community in Sydney, Australia
- Customer premises wiring, customer-owned communications transmission lines
- ST Kinetics CPW, a submachine gun
