= Chandrapur Airport =

Airport in Maharashtra, India

Chandrapur Airport चंद्रपूर विमानतळ
- IATA: none; ICAO: VA1B

Summary
- Airport type: Public
- Owner: M.A.D.C.
- Operator: M.A.D.C.
- Serves: Chandrapur
- Location: Chandrapur, India
- Elevation AMSL: 625 ft (191 m)
- Coordinates: 19.994467°N 079.222712°E

Map
- Location within Maharashtra

Runways
Direction	Length		Surface
Direction	ft	m	Surface
08/26	3,128	953	Paved
- World Aero Data

Chandrapur Airport (ICAO: VA1B) is located at Morwa, 9 km north-west of Chandrapur, Maharashtra, India. The airstrip was constructed in 1967 by the Public Works Department and is spread over 22 hectares. Neither navigational aids nor night landing facilities are available on the airstrip.

== Development ==
The state run Maharashtra Airport Development Company (MADC) that operates the airport has no plans to expand the current facility citing obstructions close to the airport. The chimneys of the thermal power plant to its west and overhead power lines all around the field restrict the scope of expansion of this airport. However, the government has plans of developing a greenfield airport at another appropriate site.
