= Chandrapur railway station =

Railway station in Maharashtra, India

- Indian Railways logo

General information
- Location: Chandrapur, Chandrapur district, Maharashtra; India
- Coordinates: 19.96°N 79.30°E
- Elevation: 189 metres (620 ft)
- System: Indian Railways station
- Owner: Indian Railways
- Operator: Central Railway
- Line: New Delhi–Chennai main line
- Platforms: 3
- Tracks: 6
- Connections: Auto stand

Construction
- Structure type: Standard (on-ground station)
- Parking: Yes
- Cycle facilities: No

Other information
- Status: Functioning
- Station code: CD
Location
- Location within Maharashtra Location within India

Chandrapur railway station (station code: CD) is a railway station serving Chandrapur city in Chandrapur district of Maharashtra state of India. It is under the Nagpur CR railway division of Central Railway zone of Indian Railways. It is located on the New Delhi–Chennai main line of Indian Railways.

The station is located at 194 m (636 ft) above sea level and has three platforms. As of 2018, 105 passenger trains stop each day at this station.

== History ==
The year of construction of the railway station is not recorded. The Ramagundam–Balharshah–Wardha–Nagpur sector of the line was electrified in 1988–89.

== Amenities ==
Amenities at Chandrapur railway station include: computerized reservation office, waiting room, retiring room, vegetarian and non-vegetarian refreshments, and a book stall.

== Gallery ==
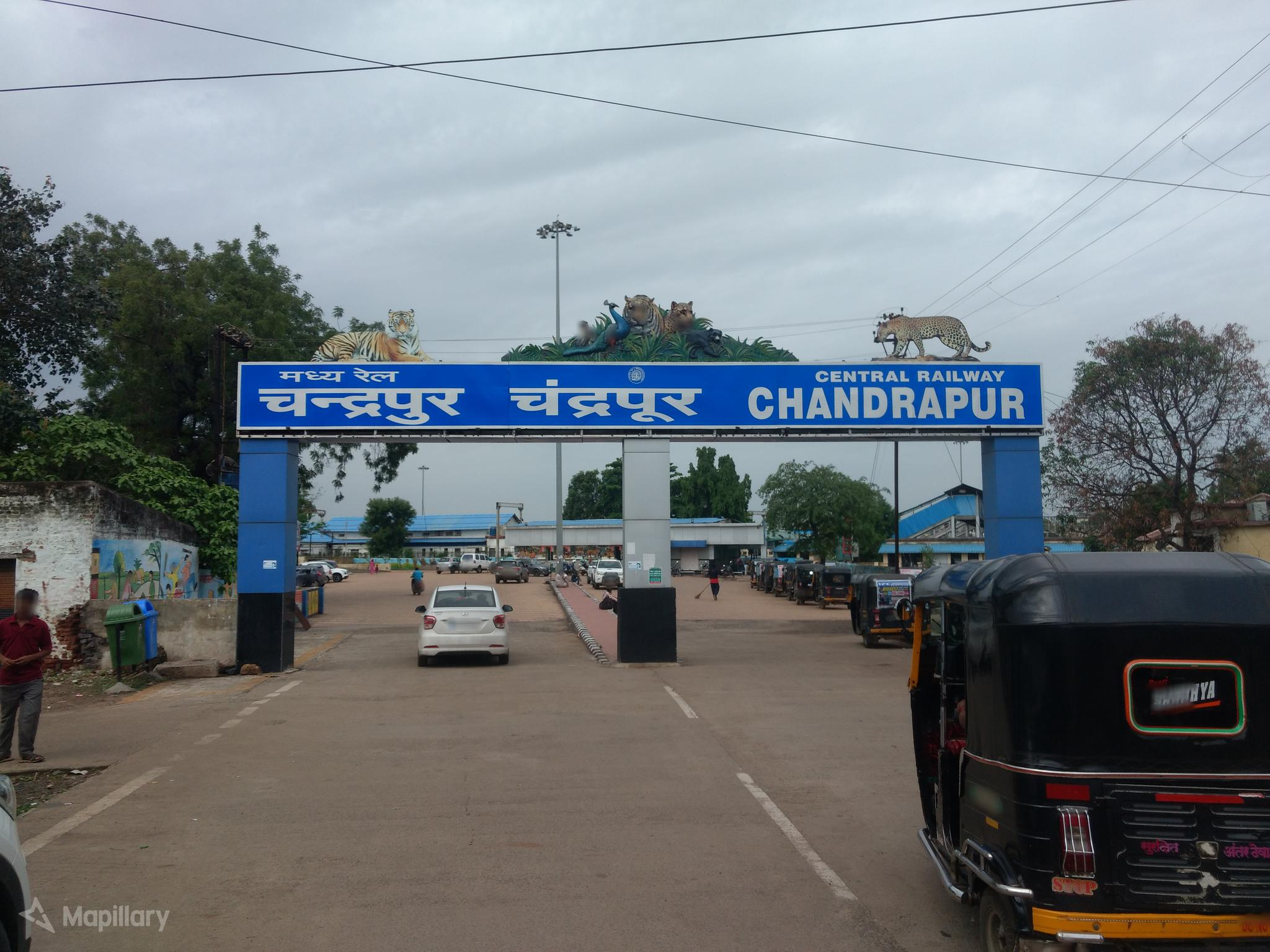
Chandrapur Railway Station

Preceding station	Indian Railways	Following station
Vivekanand Nagar towards ?	Central Railway zone Delhi–Chennai line	Babupeth towards ?
