= Urjanagar =

Urjanagar is a residential colony for the employees of Chandrapur Super Thermal Power Station (CSTPS), operated by Maharashtra State Power Generation Company Limited (MSPGCL). It is approximately 6 km from Chandrapur.

== Chandrapur Thermal Power Station ==
Chandrapur is the biggest Thermal Power Station of the MSPGCL and the largest in India among all state Electricity Boards. 25% of electricity in Maharashtra is contributed by CSTPS. The power plant has a capacity of 2340 MW. The stations hosts 4 units of 210 MW and 3 units of 500 MW each and 2 units of 500MW .

The plant was once one of the biggest thermal power stations in Asia. Mahagenco has set up a solar power plant on an experimental basis and plans to come up with two more units, adding to the employment opportunities in the area.

Residents celebrate Vardhapan Din every year on 16 January, the day the thermal power station was established.

== Demographics ==
Urjanagar has a population of approx. 10,000. It is near to Tadoba Tiger Reserve so sightings of tigers and bears are common in summer season while they migrate in search of water.

Year	Male	Female	Total Population	Change	Religion (%)							
Year	Male	Female	Total Population	Change	Hindu	Muslim	Christian	Sikhs	Buddhist	Jain	Other religions and persuasions	Religion not stated
2011	2430	2318	4748	-	58.951	2.211	0.737	0.695	37.068	0.084	0.084	0.168

== Facilities ==
The colony is divided into A/B/C/D/E and F types. Each type has a set number of buildings, and each building has 4/6/12 quarters. Two clubs, ORC and WRC, provide facilities for sports including Badminton, Table Tennis, Carom, Chess, Lawn Tennis and grounds for Cricket, Football and for other miscellaneous forms of entertainment. It has a guest house called "CHUMMREY" for employees and trainees and a VIP Guest House called "HIRAI" for top executives, managerial guests and VIPs.

== Education ==
The colony has two high schools providing education up to Class 10. Vidya Mandir High School is a Marathi medium school while Vidya Niketan is an English medium school that provides education up to Class 12.

== Health care ==
The colony has a government hospital.

== Economy ==
Two markets operate in the colony.

== Religion ==
The colony has a Hanuman Temple. People of the colony celebrate various festivals like Ganeshotsav and Durga Puja at Khule Rangmanch.
