= Secunderabad–Nagpur Express =

Indian high-speed rail

Secunderabad–Nagpur (now Raipur) Superfast Express
Overview
- Service type: Superfast
- First service: 11 March 2013; 12 years ago
- Current operator: South Central Railway zone

Route
- Termini: Secunderabad Junction (SC); Raipur Junction (R)
- Stops: 12
- Distance travelled: 877 km (545 mi)
- Average journey time: 15h 55m
- Service frequency: Tri-weekly (Note: Runs three days in a week for every direction.)
- Train number: 12771/12772

On-board services
- Classes: AC 2 tier, AC 3 tier, Sleeper class, General Unreserved
- Seating arrangements: No
- Sleeping arrangements: Yes
- Catering facilities: On-board catering E-catering
- Observation facilities: LHB rakes
- Entertainment facilities: No
- Baggage facilities: No
- Other facilities: Below the seats

Technical
- Rolling stock: 2
- Track gauge: 1,676 mm (5 ft 6 in)
- Operating speed: 56 km/h (35 mph), including halts

The Secunderabad–Nagpur Superfast Express is a Superfast train belonging to South Central Railway zone that runs between Secunderabad Junction and Nagpur Junction in India. It is currently being operated with 12771/12772 train numbers on tri-weekly basis. And now it has been extended up to Raipur.

== Service ==
The 12771/Secunderabad–Nagpur SF Express has an average speed of 56 km/h and covers 575 km in 10h 15m. The 12772/Nagpur–Secunderabad SF Express has an average speed of 55 km/h and covers 575 km in 10h 25m.

== Route and halts ==
The important halts of the train are:

- Secunderabad Junction
- Jangoan
- Kazipet Junction
- Jammikunta
- Ramagundam
- Mancherial
- Balharshah Junction
- Chandrapur
- Sewagram Junction
- Nagpur Junction

== Coach composition ==
The train runs with modern LHB rakes with max speed of 110 kmph. The train consists of 17 coaches:

- 2 AC II Tier
- 1 AC III Tier
- 8 Sleeper coaches
- 4 General Unreserved
- 2 Seating cum Luggage Rake

== Traction ==
Both trains are hauled by a Lallaguda electric loco shed-based WAP-7 electric locomotive from Nagpur to Secunderabad and vice versa.

== See also ==
- Nagpur Junction railway station
- Secunderabad Junction railway station
