= Aatkoli =

Village in Maharashtra, India

- village
- Location in Maharashtra, India Aatkoli (India)
- Coordinates: 19.3652658°N 73.1777375°E
- Country: India
- State: Maharashtra
- District: Thane
- Taluka: Bhiwandi
- Elevation: 19 m (62 ft)

Population (2011)
  - Total: 463
- Time zone: UTC+5:30 (IST)
- 2011 census code: 552609

Aatkoli is a village in the Thane district of Maharashtra, India. It is located in the Bhiwandi taluka. It lies on the Sape-Padgha road.

== Demographics ==
According to the 2011 census of India, Aatkoli has 84 households. The effective literacy rate (i.e. the literacy rate of population excluding children aged 6 and below) is 95.97%.

Demographics (2011 Census)
| | Total | Male | Female |
|---|---|---|---|
| Population | 463 | 245 | 218 |
| Children aged below 6 years | 66 | 39 | 27 |
| Scheduled caste | 0 | 0 | 0 |
| Scheduled tribe | 0 | 0 | 0 |
| Literates | 381 | 200 | 181 |
| Workers (all) | 138 | 129 | 9 |
| Main workers (total) | 102 | 97 | 5 |
| Main workers: Cultivators | 40 | 39 | 1 |
| Main workers: Agricultural labourers | 1 | 1 | 0 |
| Main workers: Household industry workers | 0 | 0 | 0 |
| Main workers: Other | 61 | 57 | 4 |
| Marginal workers (total) | 36 | 32 | 4 |
| Marginal workers: Cultivators | 1 | 0 | 1 |
| Marginal workers: Agricultural labourers | 13 | 11 | 2 |
| Marginal workers: Household industry workers | 0 | 0 | 0 |
| Marginal workers: Others | 22 | 21 | 1 |
| Non-workers | 325 | 116 | 209 |
