= Saquib Nachan =

Indian islamist (died 2025)

- Born: Saquib Abdul Hamid Nachan; Padhga, Maharashtra, India
- Died: 28 June 2025; Delhi, India
- Years active: 2003–2017
- Children: 3

Saquib Nachan (died 28 June 2025) was an Islamist who was conspired and convicted for his involvement in the 2002 and 2003 bombs at Mumbai Central railway station, Vile Parle and Mulund. Nachan was convicted of possessing weapons under the Prevention of Terrorism Act (POTA) and was sentenced to ten years' imprisonment. After being released from prison, Nachan left for his native town of Padhga with his relatives.

== Personal life ==
His father was the Zilla parishad Chief and a social worker. He graduated with a BCom and after completing his education ran a business of land development. His family owns a lot of land in the Borivli Village, Padgah, Thane district. Nachan had three children, two sons and a daughter.

Nachan was the onetime secretary of the banned Students' Islamic Movement of India.

== Bomb blast incidents ==
The first of the three blasts was on 6 December 2002. A bomb exploded in the Mumbai Central railway station, killing none but injuring 27 persons. The second blast took place on 27 January 2003. One woman died when a bomb exploded in Vile Parle and 25 others were injured. On 13 March that year, a bomb exploded in a Karjat-bound train at Mulund station, leaving 11 dead and 82 injured.

== Investigation ==
Upon investigation the police discovered that some of the accused collected explosives, some collected AK-56s and they wanted to target prominent leaders belonging to right-wing groups. They would also practise with those weapons in the hills at Padga. One of the accused had taken the police to the hills during the investigation.

Police had recovered many shells from the hills and forensic tests confirmed that the shells were from the seized weapons. Three weapons were seized from Nachan, Ateef and Haseeb. The bombs were assembled at the clinic of Wahid while the forensic reports confirmed that the traces from the clinic matched the traces in the explosion site.

== Trial ==
All accused in the Mumbai triple blasts were charged with murder, attempt to murder, causing grievous injuries, waging a war against the nation and criminal conspiracy and arms possession. They were booked under the Indian Penal Code, the Indian Railways Act, 1989, the Prevention of Damage to Public Property Act, the Arms Act, 1959, the Explosive Substances Act 1883 and the Prevention of Terrorism Act, 2002 (POTA). Nachan and Muzammil Ansari were convicted, along with eight others. Nachan was accused by Mumbai Police as the mastermind of the blasts and he was arrested from Padgha of Thane district. Some of the other accused were Ateef Mulla, Hasib Mulla, Ghulam Kotal, Mohammed Kamil, Noor Malik, Anwar Ali Khan, Farhaan Khot and Wahid Ansari. The court found him guilty of illegally possessing an AK-56 Rifle and sentenced him to a 10-year jail term.

== Aftermath ==
Nachan was released in November 2017, after having completed 10 years of punishment out of which one year and eight months were spent as a convict at the Thane Central Jail, while the remaining period was spent as an undertrial.

== Death ==
Nachan died on 28 June 2025, four days after being admitted to a Delhi hospital for a brain haemorrhage.
