= Talcher Super Thermal Power Station =

Power plant in India

- Country: India
- Coordinates: 21°5′18″N 85°4′50″E
- Status: Operational
- Commission date: February 1995
- Owner: NTPC

Thermal power station
- Primary fuel: Coal

Power generation
- Units operational: 6 × 500 MW
- Make and model: ABB; BHEL
- Nameplate capacity: 3,000 MW

External links
- Website: www.ntpc.co.in/power-generation/coal-based-power-stations/talcher-kaniha

Talcher Super Thermal Power Station or NTPC Talcher Kaniha located in Angul district of the Indian state of Odisha is the first mega power plant of India to have an installed generation capacity of 3000 MW. It is one of the coal-based power plants of NTPC. The coal for the power plant is sourced from Lingraj Block & Kaniha coal block of Mahanadi Coalfields Ltd. The source of water for the power plant is Samal Barrage Reservoir on Brahmani River.

The plant supplies power to the Indian states of Odisha, Andhra Pradesh, Karnataka, and Telangana, as well as Bihar and West Bengal. The East South Interconnection of the Indian power grid starts from NTPC Kaniha and ends at Kolar in Karnataka. This being a DC link is one of its kind in India as until now there are only three installed HVDC systems in India. The southern grid is weakly interconnected to the national grid of India through the Talcher–Kolar HVDC system in the east.

== Capacity ==
Stage	Unit number	Installed capacity (MW)	Date of commissioning
1st	1	500	1995 February
1st	2	500	1996 March
2nd	3	500	2003 January
2nd	4	500	2003 October
3rd	5	500	2004 May
3rd	6	500	2005 February
Total	Six	3000	

== See also ==
- Talcher Thermal Power Station, another coal-based power plant in close vicinity, which was taken over by NTPC from Odisha State Electricity Board in June 1995
