= Arjunali =

Village in Maharashtra

Arjoli
- village
- Location in Maharashtra, India Arjoli (India)
- Coordinates: 19.3628493°N 73.1674128°E
- Country: India
- State: Maharashtra
- District: Thane
- Taluka: Bhiwandi
- Elevation: 16 m (52 ft)

Population (2011)
  - Total: 1,580
- Time zone: UTC+5:30 (IST)
- 2011 census code: 552610

Arjunali is a village in the Thane district of Maharashtra, India. It is located in the Bhiwandi taluka. It lies on the Sape-Padgha road.

== Demographics ==
According to the 2011 census of India, Arjoli has 328 households. The effective literacy rate (i.e. the literacy rate of population excluding children aged 6 and below) is 83.37%.

Demographics (2011 Census)
	Total	Male	Female
Population	1580	832	748
Children aged below 6 years	233	112	121
Scheduled caste	117	61	56
Scheduled tribe	180	90	90
Literates	1123	636	487
Workers (all)	509	455	54
Main workers (total)	466	427	39
Main workers: Cultivators	8	5	3
Main workers: Agricultural labourers	26	21	5
Main workers: Household industry workers	3	3	0
Main workers: Other	429	398	31
Marginal workers (total)	43	28	15
Marginal workers: Cultivators	4	1	3
Marginal workers: Agricultural labourers	5	3	2
Marginal workers: Household industry workers	0	0	0
Marginal workers: Others	34	24	10
Non-workers	1071	377	694
