= Erai River =

River in Maharashtra, India

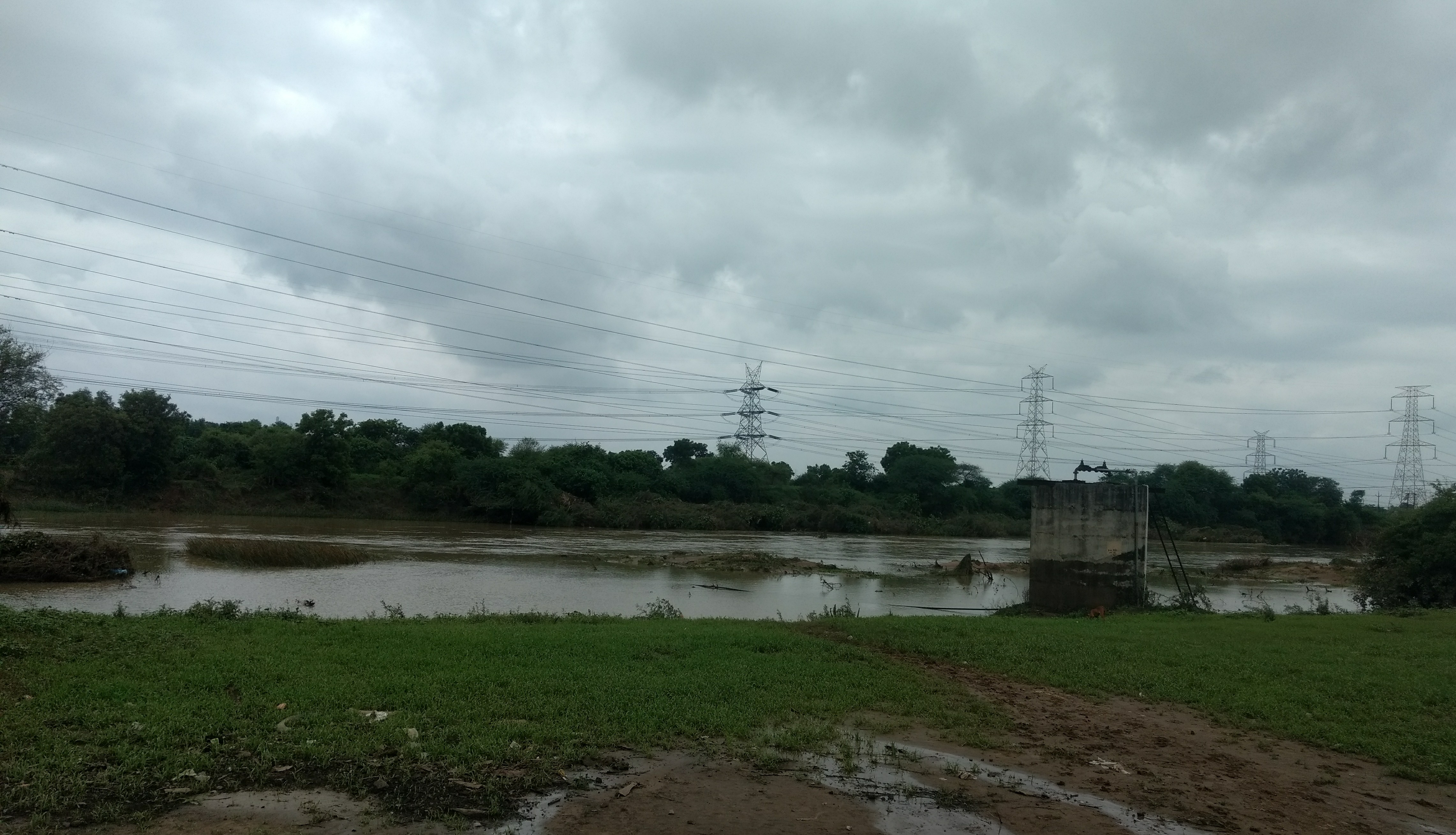
- Erai river during monsoon at Ambhora village near Urjanagar
- Native name: इरई नदी (Marathi)

Location
- State: Maharashtra
- District: Chandrapur

Physical characteristics
- Source: Near Kasarbodi village
  - coordinates: 20.52°N 79.23°E
- Mouth: Wardha river
  - coordinates: 19.8754°N 79.3030°E
- Length: 78 km

Basin features
- River system: Godavari basin

Erai river (Marathi: इरई नदी) is a tributary of Wardha river and is an important river in Chandrapur district of Maharashtra. The river originates near Kasarbodi village of Chimur taluka and meets Wardha river near Hadasti village. It has a total length of 78 km and lies entirely within Chandrapur district.

The river has a dam built on it called Erai Dam. The dam provides water to Chandrapur city and to Chandrapur Super Thermal Power Station. Zarpat river is a tributary of Erai river and meets it near Mana village.
