= Chargaon Dam =

Dam in Maharashtra, India

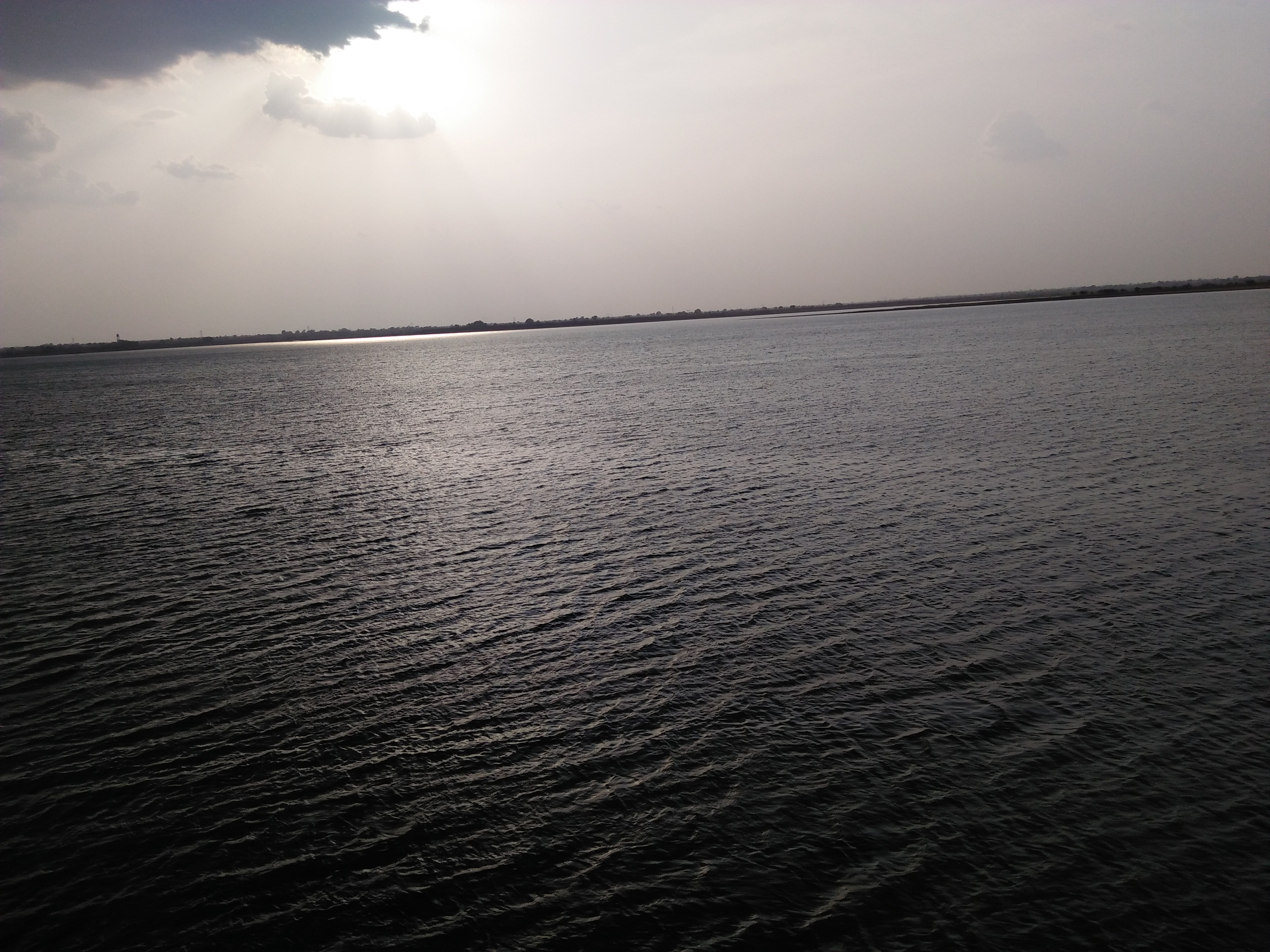
- Sunset

- Location within Maharashtra
- Official name: Chargaon Dam
- Location: Varora
- Coordinates: 20.3944526°N 79.1757202°E
- Opening date: 1983
- Owners: Government of Maharashtra, India

Dam and spillways
- Type of dam: Earthfill
- Impounds: Chargaon river
- Height: 14.4 m (47 ft)
- Length: 3,065 m (10,056 ft)
- Dam volume: 428 km^{3} (103 cu mi)

Reservoir
- Total capacity: 19,866 km^{3} (4,766 cu mi)
- Surface area: 12,921.9 km^{2} (4,989.2 sq mi)

Chargaon Dam, is an earthfill dam on Chargaon river near Varora, Chandrapur district in state of Maharashtra in India. A borderline flood situation was seen in the catchment and the low-lying areas of this dam and the nearby Erai dam in September 2012. The situation came under control after the rainfall stopped.

== Specifications ==
The height of the dam above lowest foundation is 14.4 m (47 ft) while the length is 3,065 m (10,056 ft). The volume content is 428 km^{3} (103 cu mi) and gross storage capacity is 21,700.00 km^{3} (5,206.11 cu mi).

== Purpose ==
- Irrigation

== See also ==
- Dams in Maharashtra
- List of reservoirs and dams in India
