= Swagat Thorat =

Indian wildlife photographer, playwright, painter, editor, and director

- Born: 20 March
- Occupations: Writer, poet, painter, photographer, director, editor
- Title: Braille Man of India

Swagat Thorat is an Indian wildlife photographer, playwright, painter, editor, and director. Known as the Braille Man of India, he published India's first registered fortnightly Braille newspaper in the Marathi language, called Sparshdnyan. He has also directed plays with blind performers.

== Career ==
Swagat Thorat was raised in Chandrapur in Maharashtra. In 1993, he created the documentary Kallokhatil Chandane for Pune Akashwani. As a theatre director he staged Teen Paishacha Tamasha and Apoorva Meghdoot with a cast of blind artists. He also published Sparshagandh, the first Braille Diwali magazine, in 1998 and worked for some time as editor and publisher of Sparshdnyan, the first registered fortnightly Braille newspaper in India (founded 15 February 2008). He has also been Chief Editor of Reliance Drishti, the most widely printed and read Braille fortnightly newspaper in India, which was founded in March 2012.

== Awards and recognition ==
- Real Heroes Award from CNN-IBN and Reliance
