= Talcher Thermal Power Station =

Power station in Odisha, India

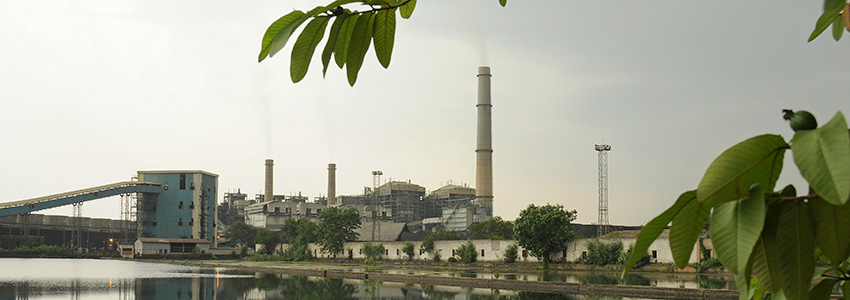
- Country: India
- Location: Talcher, Angul district
- Coordinates: 20°54′37″N 85°12′24″E
- Status: Decommissioned
- Commission date: February 1968
- Decommission date: 31 March 2021
- Owner: NTPC
- Operator: NTPC

Thermal power station
- Primary fuel: Coal

Power generation
- Units operational: 4 × 60 MW; 2 × 110 MW
- Nameplate capacity: 460 MW

External links
- Website: www.ntpc.co.in/power-generation/coal-based-power-stations/talcher-thermal

Talcher Thermal Power station is located in Talcher sub-division of Angul district in the Indian state of Odisha Pin.759101. The existing plant was closed on 31 March 2021 with the plans to set up a new plant still in discussion phase. The power plant is one of the coal-based plants of NTPC. The coal for the power plant is sourced from Jagannath Mines of Mahanadi Coalfields Limited. Source of water for the plant is from Brahmani River. It has its own railway station and is well connected to three other important stations in close vicinity: Talcher Road, Angul and Talcher Stations. This power plant has been ranked among the best power plants in the country despite being the oldest plant in the state. It has consistently topped the charts in NTPC for the last four years and was also the nation's top power plant (by PLF) in 2015-16.

On 23 November 2016, TTPS achieved the highest-ever power generation among all the power plants in the country in a single day at 104.13% PLF.

== Major milestones ==
- 5 January 1964: Foundation stone laid by then PM, Lt. Jawaharlal Nehru
- 17 December 1967: 1st unit of 62.5 MW commissioned
- 7 February 1968: 1st unit of 62.5 MW dedicated to the Nation by PM Smt. Indira Gandhi
- 1968-1969: U#2, 3,& 4 commissioned.
- 24 March 1982: 110 MW Unit commissioned. 2nd unit of 110 MW unit commissioned on 24 Mar’83
- 3 June 1995: Transfer of Talcher Thermal Power Station(TTPS) from Odisha State Electric Board (OSEB) to NTPC Ltd.
- Sep 2005: Mine back filling with ash at MCL Mines started
- 2008-09: Achieved Annual PLF of more than 90%
- 2012-13: Highest Annual PLF of 96.27% & Availability of 93.61%
- 7 February 2018: Completed 50th year of commercial operation of 1st unit
- 31 March 2021 Closed. New plant setup still under discussion.

== Capacity ==
The total capacity is 460 MW, consisting of four units of 60 MW each and two units of 110 MW each.

== Construction ==
=== Stage I ===
Unit 1 was commissioned 17-12-1967.

Unit 2 was commissioned 28-03-1968.

Unit 3 was commissioned 11-07-1968.

Unit 4 was commissioned 11-04-1969.

Stage I units were boilers (Babcock and Wilcox, USA) and TG’s of GE make.

=== Stage II ===
Unit 5 was commissioned 24-03-1982.

Unit 6 was commissioned 24-03-1983.

Stage II units are BHEL make.

The PPA agreement was signed between NTPC, OSEB and GoO on 08-03-1995 (with reference to an MOU signed between NTPC and GoO on 11-10-1994). Talcher TPS was transferred to NTPC on 03-06-1995 in pursuance to the Talcher Thermal Power Station (Transfer and Acquisition Act, 1994) with an objective to improve its performance using NTPC’s technical and managerial expertise. Total consideration for transfer payable by NTPC was Rs. 356 Cr. The Switchyard was transferred to NTPC by an MOU signed on 10-09-2000.

== Renovation and modernisation ==
Objective of R&M

- Improve/sustain availability
- Restore design efficiency/ Heat Rate
- Extend life of units
- Upgrade technology of equipment/ overcome technology obsolescence and flexibility in operation and maintenance
- Improve plant safety
- Improve environment conditions

TTPS R&M was taken in phases viz. Phase I, Phase II and Phase III, Switchyard R&M and Stage II ESP R&M. Units 5 and 6 of Talcher TPS were undertaken for R&M and LE Programme in Phase-III of R&M implementation plan with an addition to some works based on RLA study reports in TG and auxiliaries of Stage I units. Some schemes in BOP area common to both stage I and II such as air compressors and ash dyke were also covered in this phase.

The station PLF has improved from 25.90% at the time of takeover in the FY 1995-96 to 79.33% in the FY 2003-04 as an indication of successful R&M. Similarly, the heat rate at the time of takeover was 3882 kCal/kWh which also improved to 2924 during the year 2004-05. The Auxiliary power consumption at the time of takeover was 12.55%, which was reduced to 10.85% in the year 2004-05. There was also a significant decrease in forced outage of the unit from 43% at time of takeover to 3.6% during the year 2004-05. Tube leakages in Boiler was 29 times at the time of takeover and which reduced to 6 during the year 2004-05.

The benefits envisioned after performing successful R&M implementation were sustained unit availability and generation, the reliability of the unit has improved, life of the units have been increased by implementing technological up-gradation of equipments, flexibility of operation and maintenance, technological obsolescence have been overcome by replacing older equipments to get the spares of the new ones, improvement in plant safety and better environment management by installing new ESP.

== Performance ==
NTPC Talcher Thermal (commonly known as NTPC TTPS) remains one of the best renovated & performing power plants in the entire country. For the last few years it has almost constantly topped the charts of NTPC in terms of PLF (Power Load Factor) of electricity generation. It has even held the first position in the country for considerable intervals numerous times. Despite being an old take-over plant (to enter its 50th year of operation in February 2017), its performance exceeds that of newer plants of both NTPC and the private sector. The power plant officials attribute this consistency to the work culture of the township including a sense of ownership in the plant. The transformation from about 20-30% PLF during its take-over in 1995 to an average of 92-95% PLF as of 2016 has baffled experts throughout the country and foreign alike.

== Expansion ==
As part of further growth strategy, two units of 660 MW are planned to be installed within the available land of Talcher Thermal. The useful life of the existing units are likely to be completed by March 2021. Clearance for the 1320 MW expansion was accorded from Govt. of Odisha on 20-01-2020 (revised on 28-02-20).

Environment clearance for the project was accorded on 12-09-2018. 39 cusecs of water allotted for the project from River Brahmani. Coal linkage is under finalization with CCL.

== Highlights of FY 2019-20 ==
- A four-week workshop on Girls Empowerment Mission (GEM), under CSR initiative was organized in May to 16 June 2019 with the participation of around 102 girl students from peripheral schools. It is planned to replicate the same in upcoming financial year
- 46th State Junior Kabadi Championship 2019 for boys and girls concluded was organized by CSR department of NTPC /TTPS in association with Odisha Kabadi Association and Angul District Athletic Association from 12 to 14 December for three days in Shakti Stadium. Total 17 girls and 25 boys teams were participated from different districts of Odisha. Khurda girls team and Cuttack boys team were the winners in their category.
- NTPC Talcher is supporting Rashtriya Avishkar Abhiyan (RAA) under its CSR initiative primary focus areas of RAA is to strengthen the support of teachers and to bring Information and Communication Technology(ICT) into the learning atmosphere in government schools. NTPC Talcher is actively implementing this one year long initiative in 10 Upper Primary schools around the station.
- Conducted Rural volleyball tournament during 15–16 February 2020.
- Constructed community toilet blocks (Talcher SDJM court premises and another at Talcher Bus stand area).
- A total of 14 mobile health camps have been conducted.
- Ashalok Hospital organized a disability screening camp at NTPC Talcher Thermal.

== Township ==
NTPC TTPS maintains a township of about 350 acres. The colony is planned and has about 1200 houses, categorized to different types. The residence for the HOP (Head of the Project) is separate from these types.

There is a special guest house for accommodating the company guests ("Purvasha"), a multipurpose recreational center, a sports complex ("Shakti" Stadium), a modern medical facility ( "Ashalok" Hospital ), an executive club ("Spectrum" Club) and an open-air theatre.

=== Ashalok Hospital ===
Ashalok Hospital was constructed in 1967 as an OPD based Hospital. It was later converted to a 7 bed hospital and it is currently a 25 bed hospital with the following facilities: occupational health unit, ICU, cabin and IPD facility, dressing room, advanced operating theatre, radiology room with X-ray, pharmacy, pathology lab, laundry room with CSSD facility, dental unit, burn unit, and emergency unit.

Doctors at Ashalok Hospital contributed to post-Fani Cyclone restoration through medical camps conducted during May 2019, covering 8472 patients during the 22 day camp.

=== Schools ===
There are three schools on the campus with total enrollment of around 2446 students:

- D.A.V. Public School. (From Std 1 to +2 levels, English Medium).
- D.A.V. Talcher Thermal High School. (From Std 1 to Std 10, Odia medium) and D.A.V. Senior Secondary School.(+2 levels, Odia medium)
- Little Angels' Nursery School.

== See also ==
- Talcher Super Thermal Power Station, another coal-based power plant in close proximity owned by NTPC.
