= Chandrapur back-to-back HVDC converter station =

Converter station in Maharashtra, India

Location
- Country: India
- State: Maharashtra
- Coordinates: 20°05′21″N 79°08′36″E
- From: Western Region
- To: Southern Region

Ownership information
- Owner: Power Grid Corporation of India

Construction information
- Substation installer: GEC-Alstom
- Commissioned: 1997

Technical information
- Type: Back to Back
- Current type: HVDC
- Total length: 0 km (0 mi)
- Capacity: 2 x 500 MW
- DC voltage: 205 kV (each pole)
- No. of poles: 2

The Chandrapur back-to-back HVDC station is a back-to-back HVDC connection between the western and southern regions in India, located close to the city of Chandrapur. Its main purpose is to export power from the Chandrapur Super Thermal Power Station to the southern region of the Indian national power grid. It is owned by Power Grid Corporation of India.

The converter station consists of two independent poles, each with a nominal power transmission rating of 500 MW. Both poles were built by GEC-Alstom between 1993 and 1997 and have nominal DC voltage and current ratings of 205 kV, 2475 A.

The converter station is located 20 kilometres (12 mi) from the eastern terminal of the Chandrapur–Padghe HVDC transmission system. The close proximity of the two converter stations meant that the control systems needed to be carefully coordinated, a task made more challenging by the fact that the two stations were built by different manufacturers. To address this problem a series of joint simulation studies, involving the control equipment from both converter stations connected to a common simulator, was performed.

On 31 December 2013, the Northern, Eastern and Western grids were synchronised with the Southern regional grid, creating a single synchronous AC grid over the whole of India. As a result, the converter station is no longer required for its original purpose of asynchronously linking the Western and Southern grids, although it can still be used as an embedded power flow device to help control power flow within the AC system. The stations could potentially be shifted to elsewhere to export/import power from other countries. Sometimes the excess power fed to the southern grid by this HVDC link is flowing back to Western region through the 765 kV AC lines between Southern grid and the Western grid with futility.

== Arrangement and main equipment ==
=== Overall arrangement ===
Each of the two poles is identical and consists of a back-to-back connection of two 12-pulse bridge converters. Unusually, no DC smoothing reactors are used.

Each pole is grounded at one of the two DC terminals.

=== Converter transformers ===
Each of the two poles uses three, single-phase, three-winding converter transformers on each side.

=== Thyristor valves ===
The scheme comprises 48 thyristor valves (12 at each end of each pole) and with each thyristor valve including 54 thyristor levels in series. The thyristors are of 100 mm diameter and are rated at 5.2 kV. The thyristor valves are floor-mounted even though the station is located in a seismically active area.

=== AC filters and reactive power ===
Each side of the station is equipped with a total of 848 MVAr of AC harmonic filters. Each side of each pole is equipped with three, 106 MVAr double-damped filters (tuned to 12th and 24th harmonics) and one, 106 MVAr "C-type" filter (tuned to 5th harmonic). On the Southern side there are also two, 50 MVAr shunt reactors.

== Sites ==
Site	Coordinates
Chandrapur Back to Back	20°05′21″N 79°08′36″E

== See also ==
- HVDC Sileru–Barsoor
- Vizag back-to-back HVDC converter station
