= Vivekanand Nagar railway station =

Railway Station in Maharashtra, India

General information
- Location: Vivekanand Nagar, Wadgaon, Chandrapur district, Maharashtra; India
- Coordinates: 19.9820°N 79.2792°E
- Elevation: 189 metres (620 ft)
- System: Indian Railways station
- Owner: Indian Railways
- Operator: Nagpur railway division
- Lines: Delhi–Chennai line Nagpur–Hyderabad line
- Platforms: 0
- Tracks: 2

Construction
- Structure type: Standard (on-ground station)
- Parking: No
- Cycle facilities: No

Other information
- Status: Functioning
- Station code: VVKN
- Fare zone: Central
Location
- Location within India Location within Maharashtra

Vivekanand Nagar railway station (station code: VVKN) is a railway station on New Delhi–Chennai main line in Nagpur CR railway division of Central Railway Zone of Indian Railways. It serves Vivekanand Nagar and Wadgaon, a suburb of Chandrapur, in Chandrapur district in Maharashtra State in India. It is located at 189 m above sea level and has no platform. Only passenger trains stop at this station.
