= Talcher–Kolar HVDC system =

Location
- Country: India
- State: Odisha, Karnataka
- Coordinates: 21°06′01″N 85°03′49″E; 13°10′39″N 78°07′00″E
- From: Talcher, Odisha (Eastern Region)
- To: Kolar, near Bangalore (Southern Region)

Ownership information
- Owner: Power Grid Corporation of India

Construction information
- Commissioned: 2003

Technical information
- Type: Transmission
- Current type: HVDC
- Total length: 1,450 km (900 mi)
- Capacity: 2000 MW
- DC voltage: ±500 kV
- No. of poles: 2

The Talcher–Kolar HVDC system, otherwise known as the East–South interconnection II is a 1450 km HVDC transmission connection between the eastern and southern regions in India connecting four states namely Odisha, Andhra Pradesh, Tamil Nadu and Karnataka. The system has a transmission voltage of ±500 kV and was originally put into service in March 2003, with a rated power of 2000 MW. In 2007 the scheme was upgraded to 2500 MW.

The Talcher–Kolar HVDC system is owned by Power Grid Corporation of India and the converter stations were built by Siemens.

The scheme is a conventional bipolar system with overhead lines for the high-voltage conductors and ground return for the neutral current.

Block diagram of a bipolar system with ground return

== Ground electrodes ==
The scheme includes two ground electrodes, of ring construction, located at Rohila, 28.5 km northeast of the Talcher converter station and at Chikkadasarahalli, 30 km northwest of the Kolar converter station.

However, the soil conditions at some distance from the electrode at Chikkadasarahalli were later found to have higher than expected soil resistivity. These geological effects gave rise to problems with DC currents flowing into the neutral connections of transformers at nearby AC substations, which required the addition of DC blocking devices.

== Sites ==
Site	Coordinates
Talcher converter station	21°06′01″N 85°03′49″E
Rohila electrode station	21°12′11″N 85°19′05″E
Kolar converter station	13°10′39″N 78°07′00″E
Chikkadasarahalli electrode station	13°20′19″N 77°53′49″E
