= Engine power plant =

An engine power plant is a power station in which power comes from the combination of a reciprocating engine and an alternator.

Due to very short start-up time, Engine power plants can provide full output within few minutes (high flexibility) and ensure load balancing.

As the share of electricity coming from variable renewable energy sources (vRES) and power supply variations increases in many countries around the world, grid stability is becoming a growing challenge, requiring flexibility options like flexible generation, including engine power plants.

Engine power plants are also used as a reliable and efficient technology solution for:

- emergency reserve power plants
- cogeneration applications where both electricity & heat are needed, i.e. in industrial processes, for district heating, etc.
- transforming renewable gases (esp. biogas) into renewable electricity & heat
