= Babupeth railway station =

Railway Station in Maharashtra, India

General information
- Location: Babupeth, Chandrapur district, Maharashtra; India
- Coordinates: 19.9208°N 79.3130°E
- Elevation: 198 metres (650 ft)
- System: Indian Railways station
- Owner: Indian Railways
- Operator: Nagpur CR railway division, Nagpur SEC railway division
- Lines: Delhi–Chennai line Gondia–Nagbhid–Balharshah line
- Platforms: 2
- Tracks: 4
- Connections: Auto stand

Construction
- Structure type: Standard (on-ground station)
- Parking: No
- Cycle facilities: No

Other information
- Status: Functioning
- Station code: GNVR
- Fare zone: Central, South East Central
Location
- Location within India Location within Maharashtra

Babupeth railway station (station code: BUPH) is a railway station on New Delhi–Chennai main line in Nagpur CR railway division of Central Railway Zone of Indian Railways. It also lies on Gondia–Nagbhid–Balharshah line in Nagpur SEC railway division of South East Central Railway Zone of Indian Railways. It serves Babupeth, a suburb of Chandrapur, in Chandrapur district in Maharashtra State in India. It is located at 198 m above sea level and has a single platform. Only passenger trains stop at this station.
