= HVDC Sileru–Barsoor =

HVDC transmission line in India

Location
- Country: India
- Coordinates: 17°52′01″N 81°39′21″E; 19°8′20″N 81°23′47″E
- From: Sileru
- To: Barsoor

Construction information
- Commissioned: 1989
- Decommissioned: 2014

Technical information
- Type: Overhead line
- Current type: HVDC
- Total length: 196 km (122 mi)
- Capacity: 400 MW
- DC voltage: 200 kV
- No. of poles: 2

The HVDC Sileru–Barsoor is a high voltage direct current transmission system between Sileru and Barsoor in India. It is in service since 1989 as the first HVDC line in the country. The HVDC Sileru–Barsoor is a bipolar HVDC with a voltage of 200 kV and a transmission capacity of 400 megawatts. The HVDC Sileru–Barsoor couples two asynchronously operated parts of Indian electricity mains over a 196 kilometres (122 mi) long overhead line, which was originally a double-circuit 220 kV AC line from which three conductors are paralleled.

This HVDC line is not in use for a long time. On 1 January 2014, the NEW grid is synchronised with the Southern regional grid making this HVDC link redundant. 200 kV AC line of NEW grid can be directly connected to the 200 kV line of Southern grid bypassing the HVDC converter stations. Thus the energy losses taking place in the converter stations can be avoided and these HVDC converter stations can be shifted to elsewhere to export/import power from other countries.

These unused converter stations owned by APTransCo, can be used to generate hydro electricity from Srisailam Dam or Nagarjuna Sagar Dam hydro power stations when the water level in the reservoirs are below the minimum rated water head by generating power at lower/under frequency (< 50 Hz). The lower frequency power is converted to normal grid frequency power with these converter stations. Thus more water available in the dead storage of these reservoirs can be used for additional power generation to meet peaking demand in summer months.

== Sites ==
Site	Coordinates
Sileru Static Inverter Plant	17°52′01″N 81°39′21″E
Barsoor Static Inverter Plant	19°8′20″N 81°23′47″E

== See also ==
- APTransCo
- Vizag back to back HVDC converter station
- Chandrapur back to back HVDC converter station
