= Commercial Processing Workload =

Type of benchmarking standard

The Commercial Processing Workload (CPW) is a simplified variant of the industry-wide TPC-C benchmarking standard originally developed by IBM to compare the performance of their various AS/400 (now IBM i) server offerings.

The related, but less commonly used Computational Intensive Workload (CIW) measures performance in a situation where there is a high ratio of computation to input/output communication. The reverse situation is simulated by the CPW.
