= Power Grid Corporation of India =

Indian central public sector undertaking

Power Grid Corporation of India Limited
- Type: Central Public Sector Undertaking
- Traded as: NSE: POWERGRID; BSE: 532898; BSE SENSEX Constituent; NSE NIFTY 50 Constituent
- Industry: Electricity grids
- Founded: 23 October 1989; 37 years ago
- Headquarters: Gurugram, Haryana, India
- Area served: India
- Key people: Vamsi Rama Mohan Burra (CMD)
- Products: Transmission; Distribution; Energy trading
- Revenue: ▲₹46,913 crore (US$4.9 billion) (2024)
- Operating income: ▲₹19,085 crore (US$2.0 billion) (2024)
- Net income: ▲₹15,573 crore (US$1.6 billion) (2024)
- Total assets: ▲₹250,890 crore (US$26 billion) (2024)
- Total equity: ▲₹87,145 crore (US$9.0 billion) (2024)
- Owner: Ministry of Power, Government of India
- Number of employees: 8,316(March 2024)
- Divisions: Powertel India Limited; Central Transmission Utility of India Limited
- Website: www.powergrid.in

Power Grid Corporation of India Limited is an Indian central public sector undertaking under the ownership of the Ministry of Power, Government of India. It is primarily engaged in transmission of bulk power across different states of India. It is headquartered in Gurugram. Power Grid transmits about 50% of the total power generated in India on its transmission network.

== History ==
The Power Grid Corporation of India Limited was incorporated on 23 October 1989 under the Companies Act, 1956 with an authorized share capital of Rs. 5,000 Crore (subsequently enhanced to Rs. 10,000 Crore in Financial Year (FY) 2007–08) as a public limited company, wholly owned by the Government of India with 51.34% stake in the company as on 31 December 2020 and as principal electric power transmission company for the country.

Its original name was the "National Power Transmission Corporation Limited", which was charged with planning, executing, owning, operating, and maintaining high-voltage transmission systems in the country. On 8 November 1990, the firm received its Certificate for Commencement of Business. Their name was subsequently changed to Power Grid Corporation of India Limited on 23 October 1992.

Power Grid management started functioning in August 1991 and subsequently took over transmission assets from National Thermal Power (NTPC), National Hydroelectric Power Corporation (NHPC), North Eastern Electric Power Corporation Limited (NEEPCO), Neyveli Lignite Corporation (NLC), and other companies such as NPC, THDC, SJVNL in a phased manner; it commenced commercial operation in January 1993. It also took over the operation of existing Regional Load Despatch Centers (RLDCs) from the Central Electricity Authority (CEA), in a phased manner from 1994 to 1996, which have been upgraded and modernized with Unified Load Despatch and Communication (ULDC) schemes. The National Load Despatch Centre (NLDC) was established in 2009 for overall coordination at the national level. Later, the company diversified into the telecom sector for efficient use of its spare telecommunication capacity of unified load dispatch center (ULDC) schemes and also leveraged its country-wide transmission infrastructure.

According to its mandate, the corporation, apart from providing a transmission system for evacuation of central sector power, is also responsible for the establishment and operation of regional and national power grids to facilitate the transfer of power within and across the Regions with reliability, security, and economy on sound commercial principles. Based on its performance, the firm was recognized as a Mini-Ratna Category-I Public Sector Undertaking in October 1998. It was conferred with the status of "Navratna" by the Government of India in May 2008 and "Maharatna" status in October 2019.

== Business ==
Power Grid operates throughout India and covers 90% of country's interstate and inter-regional electric power transmission system and its business segments include Transmission, Consultancy, Telecom and ULDC/ RLDC. Its transmission network consists of roughly 168,140 circuit kilometers and 252 EHVAC and HVDC substations, with total transformation capacity of 422,430 MVA as of 31 January 2021, and an availability of over 99%. Power Grid's interregional capacity is 75,050 MW. Examples of Power Grid-owned stations include the Vizag back-to-back HVDC converter station, the Chandrapur back-to-back HVDC converter station, and the Talcher–Kolar HVDC system.

Power Grid is listed on both the BSE and the NSE. As of 30 September 2010, there were 792,096 equity shareholders in Power Grid. Initially, Power Grid managed transmission assets owned by NTPC, NHPC Limited, and NEEPCO Limited. In January 1993, the Power Transmission Systems Act transferred ownership of the three power companies to Power Grid. All employees of the three companies subsequently became Power Grid employees.

=== Powertel ===
Power Grid's telecom company, Powertel, operates a network of 100,000 kilometres (62,000 mi) and has points of presence in 3000+ locations across India.

== Transmission network failures ==
About 2:35 a.m on 30 July 2012, the Northern Region Grid, which provides power to nine states in northern India, including Delhi, experienced a widespread outage due to a grid disturbance. Power Grid and POSOCO began work immediately to restore power. By 8:00 a.m. essential services had been restored, with 60 percent of the normal Northern Region Grid load restored by 11:00 a.m. Power supply was then restored progressively, and by 12:30 p.m. power was extended to most of the cities and towns through Power Grid substations. The Northern Region Grid was brought back to normalcy to meet the demand of about 30 GW at 7:00 p.m.

On 31 July 2012, the Northern Region Grid collapsed a second time, hours after the power supply had been restored to the northern region following the previous day's disruption. Eastern transmission lines also failed, disrupting power supply in Delhi, Uttar Pradesh, Haryana, West Bengal, Assam and Punjab, among other states. After the power failures, then-Power Minister Veerappa Moily said that transmission grids would be independently audited in three months to ensure that the grids were fail-safe.

== PowerGrid InvIT initial public offering ==
In late April 2021, PowerGrid floated an offer for sale via the Infrastructure Investment Trust (InvIT) route. The offer opened on 29 April and closed on 3 May, after which the initial public offering was subscribed 4.83 times. This was the second InvIT initial public offering in the country.

== Historical landmarks ==
Following are the historical landmarks in the lifetime of the company from the date of formation:

2008 - completed the 220 KV Double Circuit Transmission line from Pul-e-Khumri to Kabul Transmission System in Afghanistan.

2006 - Commissioned the unified load despatch and communications scheme for the western region and also entered into an agreement with REC and certain state governments and state utilities for undertaking rural electrification works under the Rajiv Gandhi Grameen Vidyutikaran Yojana in nine states in India.

2005 - Commissioned the unified load despatch and communications scheme for the eastern region.

2003 - Entered into a joint venture arrangement with the Tata Power Company Ltd for implementing a part of the entire transmission system associated with the Tala Hydro-Electric Project, which was the first public-private sector initiative in the transmission sector, and commissioned the 400 KV Raipur-Rourkela line transmission line developed by it, and also secured their first international consultancy contract from Bhutan Telecommunications.

2002 - Commissioned the unified load dispatch and communications schemes for the northern and southern regions, and also commissioned the 2,000 MW Talchar-Kolar bipolar HVDC link developed by it.

2001 - Department of Telecommunications, GoI, granted Infrastructure Provider II license (IP II), to pursue leasing of bandwidth capacity to various customers on their telecommunications network.

1996 - Acquired the management of the remaining two regional load despatch centres, the Northern Regional Load Despatch Centre and the Western Load Despatch centre.

1995 - Acquired the management of the Eastern Regional Despatch Centre and the North Eastern Load Despatch Centre.

1994 - Took over the management of Southern Regional Load Despatch Centre and transmission assets from Neyveli Lignite Corporation Ltd, which were transferred to the company.

== See also ==
- India Sri Lanka HVDC Interconnection
- Talcher–Kolar HVDC system
- Chandrapur back-to-back HVDC converter station
- Vizag back-to-back HVDC converter station
- The Electricity Act, 2003
- Electricity sector in India
- Central Power Research Institute
- Electrical Research and Development Association (ERDA)
- National Power Training Institute
- Central Electricity Authority
- Ministry of New and Renewable Energy
- Ministry of Atomic Energy
- National Grid (India)
