= Choti Padoli railway station =

Railway Station in Maharashtra, India

General information
- Location: Padoli, Chandrapur district, Maharashtra; India
- Coordinates: 20.00°N 79.25°E
- Elevation: 188 metres (617 ft)
- System: Indian Railways station
- Owner: Indian Railways
- Line: Delhi–Chennai line
- Platforms: 1
- Tracks: 2
- Connections: Auto stand

Construction
- Structure type: Standard (on ground station)
- Parking: Yes
- Cycle facilities: No

Other information
- Status: Functioning
- Station code: CPW
- Fare zone: Central
Location
- Location within Maharashtra Location within India

Choti Padoli railway station (station code: CPW) is a railway station on New Delhi–Chennai main line in Nagpur CR railway division of Central Railway Zone of Indian Railways. It serves Padoli, a suburb of Chandrapur, in Chandrapur district in Maharashtra State in India. It is located at 188 m above sea level and has a single platform. Only passenger trains stop at this station.
