= Chandrapur =

Chandrapur Chanda
- City
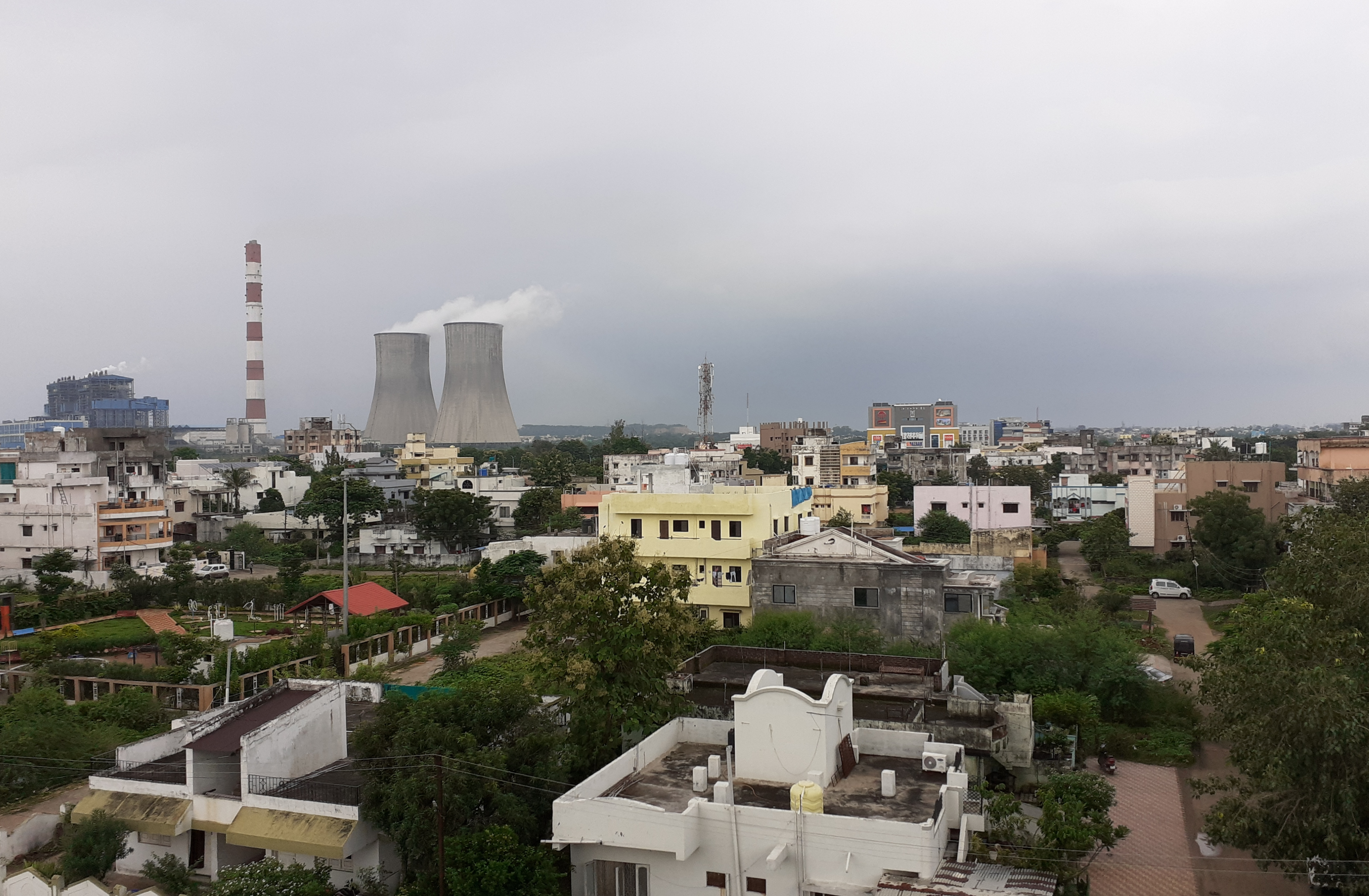
- Nickname: Black Gold City
- Interactive map of Chandrapur
- Coordinates: 19.950°N 79.297°E
- Country: India
- State: Maharashtra
- District: Chandrapur
- Founder: Khandkya Ballal Shah
- Named for: Mahakali Temple

Government
  - Type: Mahanagar Palika
  - Body: Chandrapur Municipal Corporation
  - Mayor: Sangeeta Khandekar (BJP)
  - Municipal Commissioner: Vipin Paliwal, IAS
  - Chairman, Standing Committee: Ramu Tiwary

Area
  - Total: 76 km^{2} (29 sq mi)
- Elevation: 188 m (617 ft)

Population (2024)
  - Total: 518,000 Chandrapur Urban Area
  - Rank: Vidarbha: 4th
  - Density: 4,200/km^{2} (11,000/sq mi)
- Demonym: Chandrapurkar

Language
  - Official: Marathi
- Time zone: UTC+5:30 (IST)
- PIN: 442401,442402,442403,442404
- Telephone code: (+91), 7172
- Vehicle registration: MH-34
- Website: Official website

Chandrapur (earlier known as Chanda, the official name until 1964) is a city and a municipal corporation in Chandrapur district, Maharashtra state, India. It is the district headquarters of Chandrapur district. Chandrapur is a fort city founded by Khandkya Ballal Shah, a Gond king of the 13th century. The city sits at the confluence of the Erai River and Zarpat river. The area around the city is rich in coal seams.. Hence, Chandrapur is also known as the "Black Gold City".

== Etymology ==
The district Chandrapur was earlier known as ‘Chanda’ according to tradition and legend the name of the place was ‘Lokapura’ which was first changed to ‘ Indpur’ and subsequently to Chandrapur.

The founding legend of Chandrapur is rooted in the legend of Chanda Kingdom's king Khandkya Ballal Sah (1437-62 CE) of Sirpur, who was afflicted with tumors. Guided by his wife, he relocated to the Wardha River's north bank, establishing Ballarpur. During a hunt, he discovered a spring on the Zarpat River's dry bed, its waters miraculously healing his ailment. Upon further investigation, the spring revealed cow footprints in rock, deemed a holy site, "Tirtha of Acalesvar", the Achaleshwar Temple group in Chandrapur was erected there after the deity appeared to the king in a dream. Later, witnessing a hare chase his dog, the king, following his wife's advice, founded a fortified city, Chandrapur, avoiding the spot where the hare was killed, deemed unlucky. This narrative combines myth and local lore to explain the city's establishment and the significance of its sacred spring.

== History ==
=== Pre-history ===
There are many Stone-Age sites in Chandrapur District. Suresh Chopane, a renowned researcher, found many Stone-Age tools in the district, which have been displayed in his Rock Museum. Archeological finds, such as signs of pottery making, suggest inhabitation of the Chandrapur area in Neolithic times. The Gond people are part of the Adivasi (indigenous people) of India. In ancient times, the Gond diaspora spread throughout central India.

=== Early history ===
From ancient times, Chandrapur has fallen under the control of many different rulers. Between 322 BCE and 187 BCE, much of India, including Maharashtra, was part of the Maurya Empire. From 187 BCE to 78 BCE, Chandrapur was part of the Shunga Empire which controlled much of central and eastern India. The Satavahana Empire controlled Chandrapur from the 1st century BCE to the 2nd century CE. The Vakataka dynasty ruled the area from the mid 3rd century CE to 550 CE. The Kalachuri dynasty ruled the area during the 6th and 7th centuries CE. The Rashtrakuta dynasty followed, controlling the Chandrapur region between the 7th and 10th centuries. The Chalukya dynasty ruled the region to the 12th century CE. The Seuna (Yadava) dynasty of Devagiri ruled a kingdom, including the Chandrapur area, in approximately 850 CE and continued until 1334 CE.

=== Medieval history ===
After the passage of many kings, who were largely subservient to other rulers, the Gond king of Kingdom of Chanda, Khandkya Ballal (1470 – 1495) came to the throne. He founded Chandrapur.

=== Maratha Empire and British colonial period ===
Chandrapur was taken over by Bhonsles of Nagpur in 1751 during the Maratha Empire period. The last ruler of the Maratha dynasty, Raghuji Bhonsle III died in 1853 without issue. In 1853, Chandrapur was annexed to British India under the Doctrine of Lapse, a policy used to absorb Indian princely states into the empire. .

=== British colonial period ===
During the British colonial period, the area of Chandrapur was called "Chanda". By 1871, Anglican and Scottish Episcopal missionaries had arrived in the city.

In 1874, three tehsils were created: Viz Mul, Warora and Bramhpuri.

- The upper Godavai district of Madras was abolished and four tehsils were added to Chandrapur to form one tehsil with Sironcha, approximately 150 km to the south, as its centre of governance.

In 1895, the headquarters was transferred to Chandrapur.

  - In 1905, a new tehsil with headquarters at Gadchiroli was created through the transfer of zamindari estates from Bramhpuri and Chandrapur tehsil.

In 1907, a small area of land was transferred from Chandrapur to the newer districts and another area of about 1560 km^{2}, comprising three divisions of the lower Sironcha tehsil (Cherla, Albak and Nugir) were transferred to Madras State.

  - Between 1911 and 1955, no major changes occurred in the boundaries of the district or its tehsils.

=== Since Indian independence in 1947 ===
In 1956, with the reorganization of Indian states, Chandrapur district was transferred from Madhya Pradesh to Bombay state.

- In 1959, part of Adilabad district of Hyderabad state, was transferred to Chandrapur district.
  - In May 1960, Chandrapur district became part of the Maharashtra state.
- In 1964, the city was renamed to Chandrapur.

Following the 1981 Census of India, Chandrapur district was divided into Chandrapur district and Gadchiroli district.

== Geography ==
Chandrapur is located in central India in the eastern part of Maharashtra state at 19.57°N latitude and 79.18°E longitude. Chandrapur is situated at 189.90 meters above the mean sea level. The area of the city is about 162.41 km^{2}. The north–south length of the city is about 15.90 km, while the east–west length is about 10.90 km. The city slopes from the north to the south.

Chandrapur lies at the confluence of the Erai and Zarpat rivers. The Erai river has a history of flooding. Flood marks are seen on the walls of the city. In the north of the city, a dam is constructed on the river Erai, having the capacity of 207 million cubic meters. The Gaontideo Nala originates from the uplands of the Chandrapur Super Thermal Power Station. The Macchhi Nala originates from uplands of Central Forest Rangers College.

Chandrapur lies on terrain rich in coal. Chandrapur is called a "geological museum" as there is a large variety of rocks as well as commercially valuable minerals and fossils. Samples of such rocks are collected at the Suresh Chopane Rock Museum.

== Climate ==
Chandrapur has a hot and dry climate. December is the coldest month, with a minimum average temperature of 9 °C and a maximum average temperature of 23.2 °C. May is the hottest month with a mean maximum temperature of 43 °C and a mean minimum temperature of 28.2 °C. On 2 June 2007, Chandrapur recorded the highest temperature of 49 °C and the lowest temperature of 2.8 °C. was recorded in January 1899 & 2021.

The monsoon season falls between June and September. Chandrapur's average annual rainfall is 1249.4 mm. The average number of rainy days is 59.2.

Climate data for Chandrapur (1991–2020, extremes 1901–2020)
Month	Jan	Feb	Mar	Apr	May	Jun	Jul	Aug	Sep	Oct	Nov	Dec	Year
Record high °C (°F)	35.8 (96.4)	40.0 (104.0)	44.4 (111.9)	46.4 (115.5)	48.6 (119.5)	49.0 (120.2)	40.6 (105.1)	37.2 (99.0)	38.4 (101.1)	40.1 (104.2)	36.1 (97.0)	38.7 (101.7)	49.0 (120.2)
Mean daily maximum °C (°F)	30.4 (86.7)	33.6 (92.5)	37.9 (100.2)	41.3 (106.3)	43.1 (109.6)	38.0 (100.4)	31.9 (89.4)	30.6 (87.1)	32.2 (90.0)	32.7 (90.9)	31.0 (87.8)	30.1 (86.2)	34.5 (94.1)
Mean daily minimum °C (°F)	14.6 (58.3)	17.2 (63.0)	21.5 (70.7)	25.6 (78.1)	28.5 (83.3)	27.0 (80.6)	24.9 (76.8)	24.4 (75.9)	24.4 (75.9)	22.2 (72.0)	17.7 (63.9)	13.7 (56.7)	21.8 (71.2)
Record low °C (°F)	2.8 (37.0)	3.9 (39.0)	7.2 (45.0)	11.7 (53.1)	18.9 (66.0)	20.0 (68.0)	17.8 (64.0)	18.3 (64.9)	18.3 (64.9)	10.9 (51.6)	6.2 (43.2)	3.5 (38.3)	2.8 (37.0)
Average rainfall mm (inches)	10.8 (0.43)	8.3 (0.33)	19.4 (0.76)	17.5 (0.69)	19.9 (0.78)	219.9 (8.66)	373.8 (14.72)	325.0 (12.80)	181.7 (7.15)	65.5 (2.58)	10.5 (0.41)	3.5 (0.14)	1,255.8 (49.44)
Average rainy days	0.7	0.6	1.5	1.6	1.7	9.2	15.1	14.8	8.9	3.8	0.8	0.3	59.0
Average relative humidity (%) (at 17:30 IST)	45	36	28	25	23	48	72	77	69	61	57	50	49
Source: India Meteorological Department

Chandrapur has been ranked 20th best “National Clean Air City” under (Category 2 3-10L Population cities) in India according to 'Swachh Vayu Survekshan 2024 Results'

== Demographics ==
Per the 2011 census of India, Chandrapur's population was 518,000.

=== Languages ===
Marathi is spoken by majority of the people in Chandrapur. The native Gondi is spoken by most of the Gonds in Chandrapur. People can also speak Hindi and English.

Akhil Bharatiya Marathi Sahitya Sammelan, the conference on Marathi literature, has been held twice in Chandrapur, in 1979 (Chair Vaman Krushna Chorghade) and in 2012 (Chair Vasant Aabaji Dahake).

In 2016, the inaugural All India Gondi Religious Convention was convened by the Central Provinces and Berar Gondwana Samaj Sewa Samiti in Warora, 30 km north west of Chandrapur. The chair was Raja Virshah Krushnashah Atram, a descendant of Khandkya Ballal Sah and current titular Gond king of Chandrapur.

=== Religion ===
According to the 2011 India census, total population was 3,20,379.

Year	Male	Female	Total Population	Change
2001	151202	138248	289450	-
2011	164085	156294	320379	0.107

Religion in Chandrapur City (2011)
Religion	Percent
Hinduism	71.84%
Buddhism	15.64%
Islam	10.07%
Others	2.44%

== Transport ==
Chandrapur lies on major state highways MH MSH 6, MH MSH 9 and state highways MH SH 233, MH SH 243 and MH SH 264. Chandrapur is connected to many cities in Maharashtra by the Maharashtra State Road Transport Corporation bus service. Bus services are offered to Pune, Nagpur, Amravati, Yavatmal, Hyderabad, and Raipur. A proposed Chandrapur Pune expressway, via Yavatmal Beed, is in the planning stages.

Chandrapur railway station is managed by the Nagpur CR railway division of the Central Railway. It lies on the New Delhi–Chennai main line. The Chanda Fort railway station is managed by the Nagpur SEC railway division of the South East Central Railway. It lies on the Balharshah–Gondia line. Other railway stations within city limits are Vivekanand Nagar railway station, Babupeth railway station and Choti Padoli railway station.

Chandrapur Airport, operated by the Maharashtra Airport Development Company, is situated near Morwa on MH SH 264, about 12 km from the city. The airstrip is 950 m in length. Development of the airport is limited by surrounding obstructions, particularly the thermal power plant. Hence, the MADC is building a greenfield airport at Vihirgaon, 40 kilometres from Chandrapur. The nearest airport with scheduled flights is the Dr. Babasaheb Ambedkar International Airport in Nagpur.

== Economy ==
Chandrapur is a centre for coal mining. In 2012, there were 27 coal mines around Chandrapur.

Other industries include Thermal energy, cement making, paper manufacturing, and ferro alloy manufacturing.

=== Chandrapur Super Thermal Power Station ===
The Chandrapur Super Thermal Power Station, a 3,340 MW power station complex which is owned by the Maharashtra State Power Generation Company Limited, occupies an area of 12,212 hectares (122.12 km^{2}) about 6 kilometres (3.7 mi) from the city. It employs approximately 3,460 people and supplies more than 25 percent of the state's electricity. A masonry dam on the Erai river, 15 km from the station provides water to the station and to Chandrapur. On 16 January 1977, the station's foundation stone was laid by the Central Energy Minister, K. C. Pant.

== Education ==
- The Karmavir Dadasaheb Kannamwar High School (previously known as the Zilha Parishad Jubilee High School) was established in 1906.
- The Lokmanya Tilak Vidyalaya was founded by Bal Gangadhar Tilak. The Chanda Sikshan Prasarak Mandal is a large educational institution with a number of campuses in Chandrapur.

=== Professional ===
Chandrapur has a government medical college and a government engineering college. The city's colleges (apart from the medical college) are affiliated with Gondwana University.

== Administration ==
On 20 October 2011, Chandrapur municipal council was elevated to a D-grade municipal corporation.

== Important places ==
Chandrapur Fort

The Chandrapur Fort (earlier known as Chanda Fort) (today called "old city") is a fort located at confluence of Erai and Zarpat rivers. The fort was built by Gond king, Khandkya Ballal Sah. The fort has four gates: Jatpura Gate to the north, Anchaleshwar Gate to the east, Pathanpura Gate to the south and Binba Gate to the west. The fort also has Five small gates, called khidkis (windows): Bagad Khidki to the northeast, Hanuman Khidki to the southeast, Vithhal Khidki to the southwest and Chor Khidki to the northwest and Masan Kidki. The fort has strong walls 15–20 feet high.

Gates and Windows of Chandrapur Fort
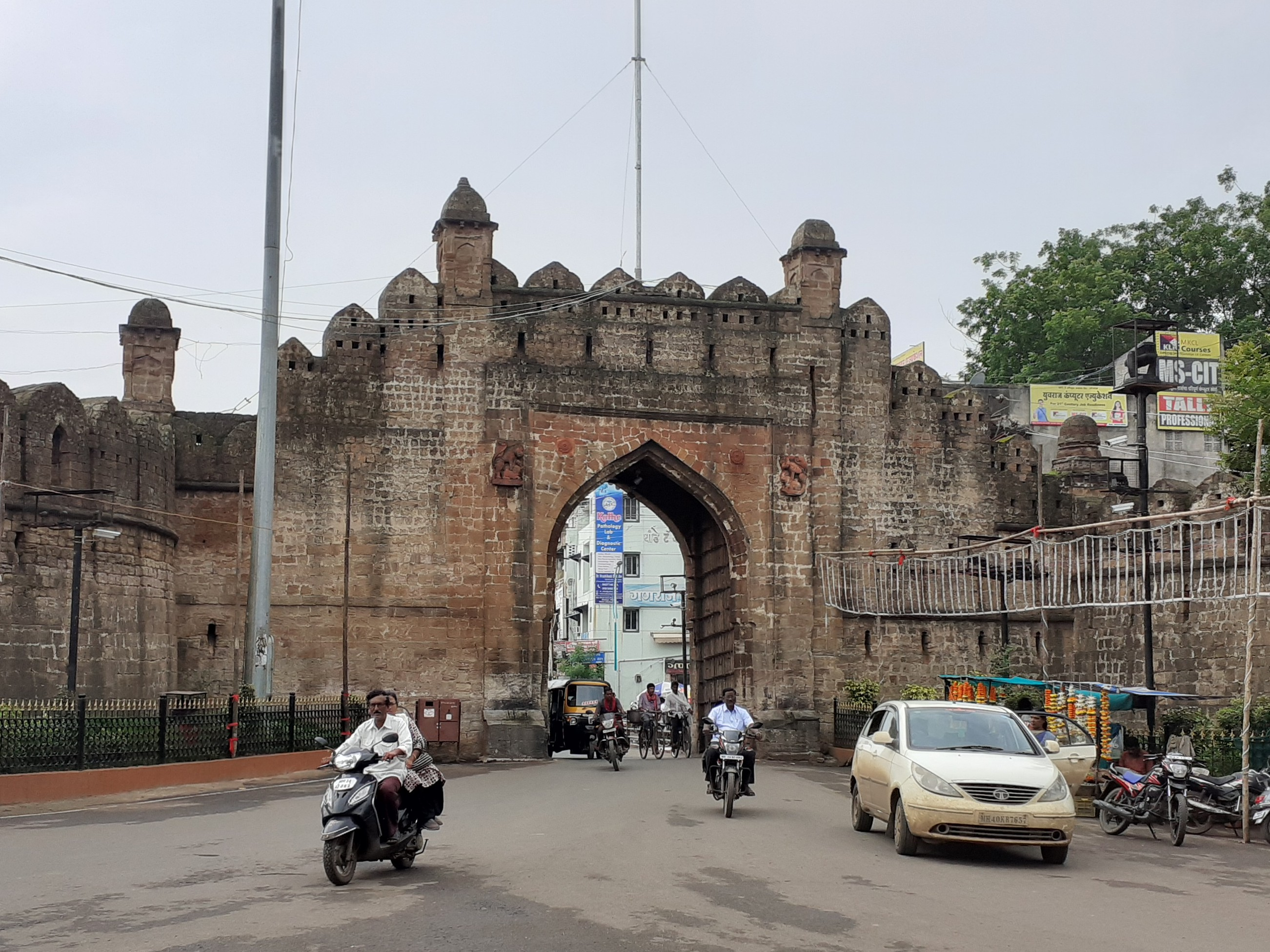
Jatpura gate of Chandrapur Fort

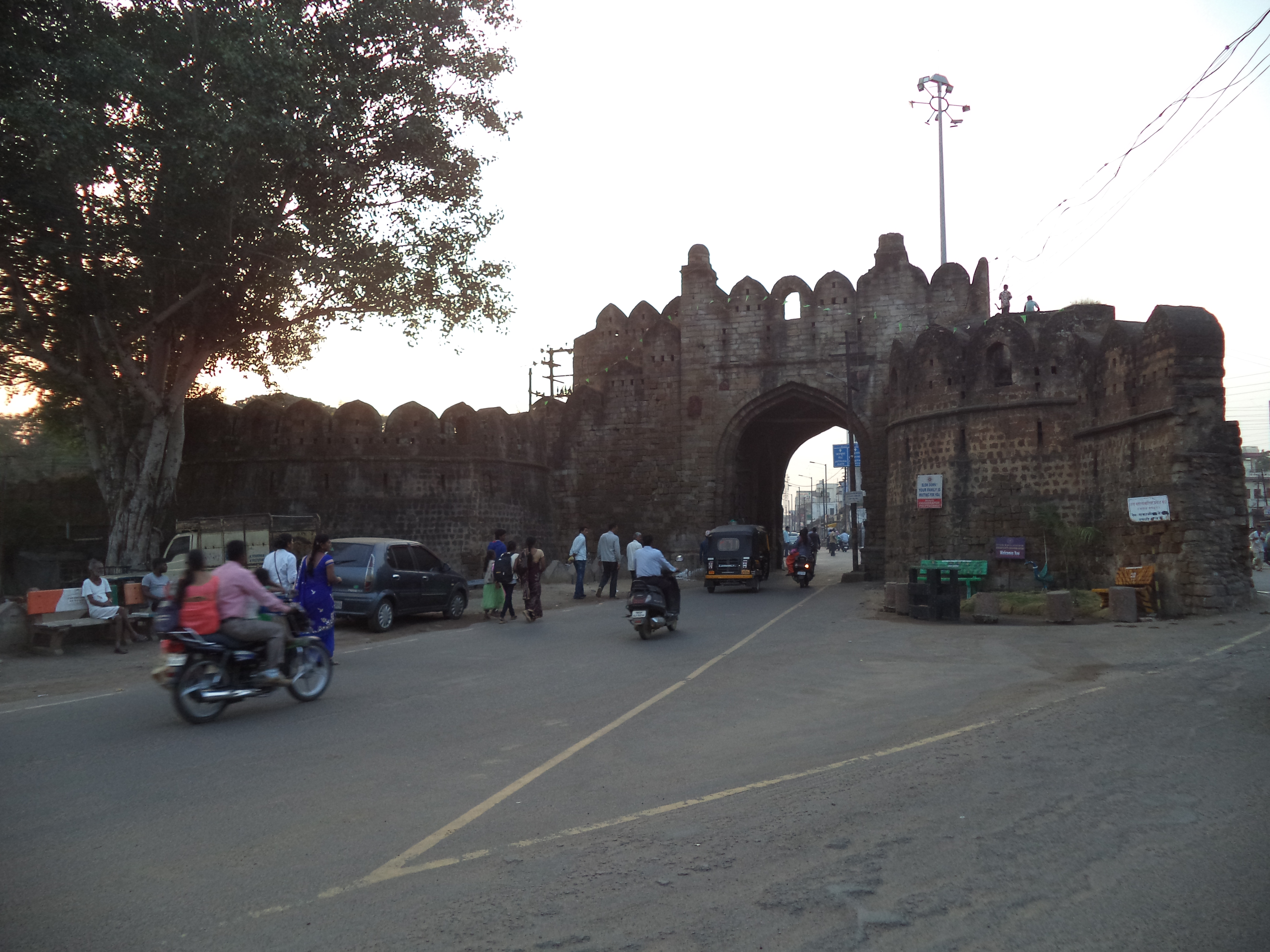
Anchaleshwar gate of Chandrapur Fort

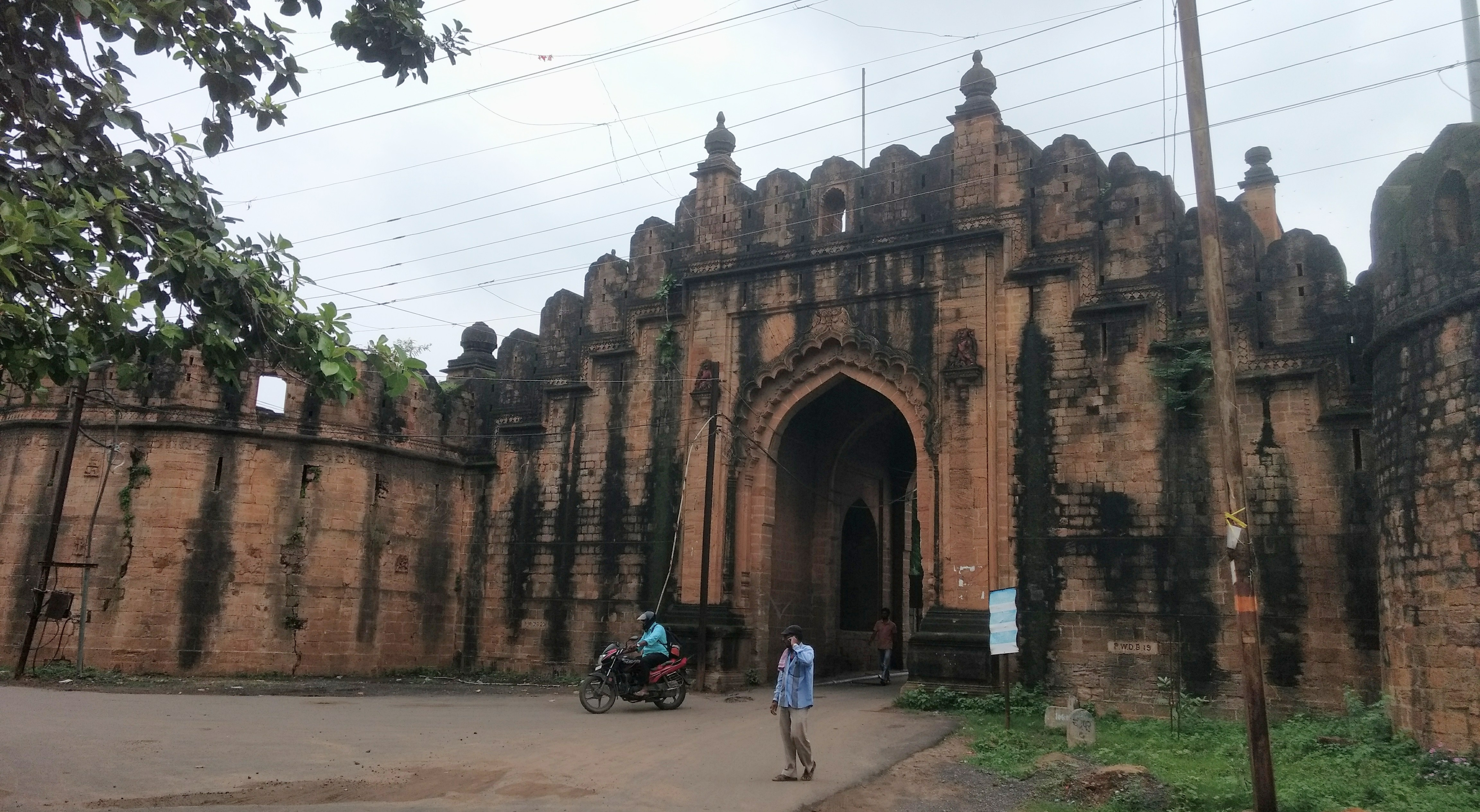
Pathanpura gate of Chandrapur Fort

Mahakali Mandir

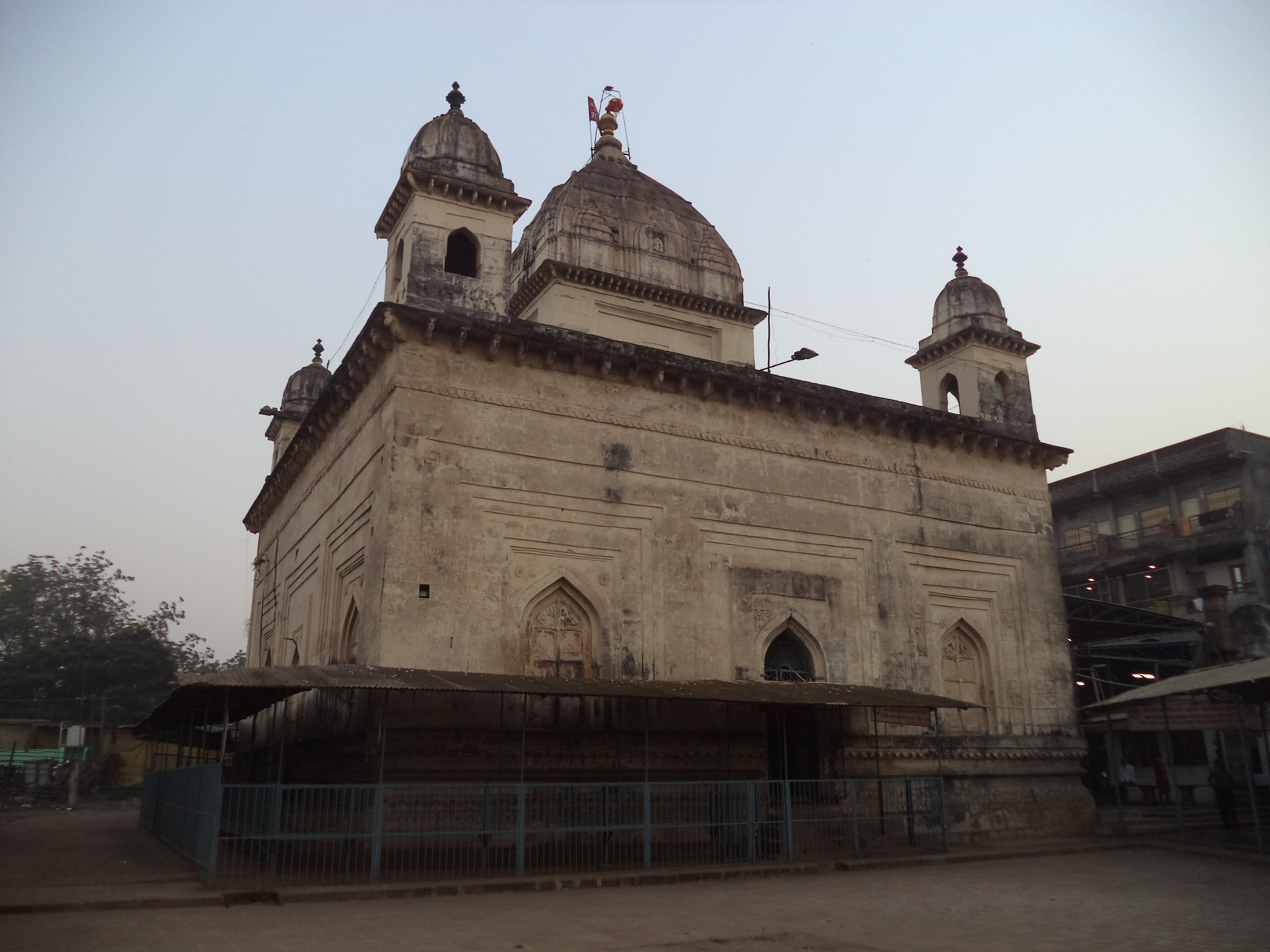
Mahakali Mandir

Mahakali Mandir (temple) is an often frequented temple in Chandrapur. The ancient temple was built by Dhundya Ram Sah, of Gond Dynasty around the 16th century. Tuesdays are a particularly significant day to visit. Within the mandir there is a small Ganesh temple and a Hanuman temple. At the two temple entrances, there are small shops for puja (worship) supplies such as coconut, flowers and cloth. Items for home décor and puja décor are sold near the temple. Near the rear entrance there is a Shani temple.

Within the temple are two murtis (idols). One associated with Shiv Ling is a standing idol decorated with red, yellow and orange cloths. The other is in a reclining position below the ground level, and devotees must walk in a tunnel to reach it. Inside the temple, a priest is present to assist visitors with puja and offerings. A trust administers the temple. Dharmashalas provide accommodation for pilgrims. The annual yatra (fair) takes place in April, entertaining the followers of Mahakali and the citizens of Chandrapur.

Anchaleshwar Mandir

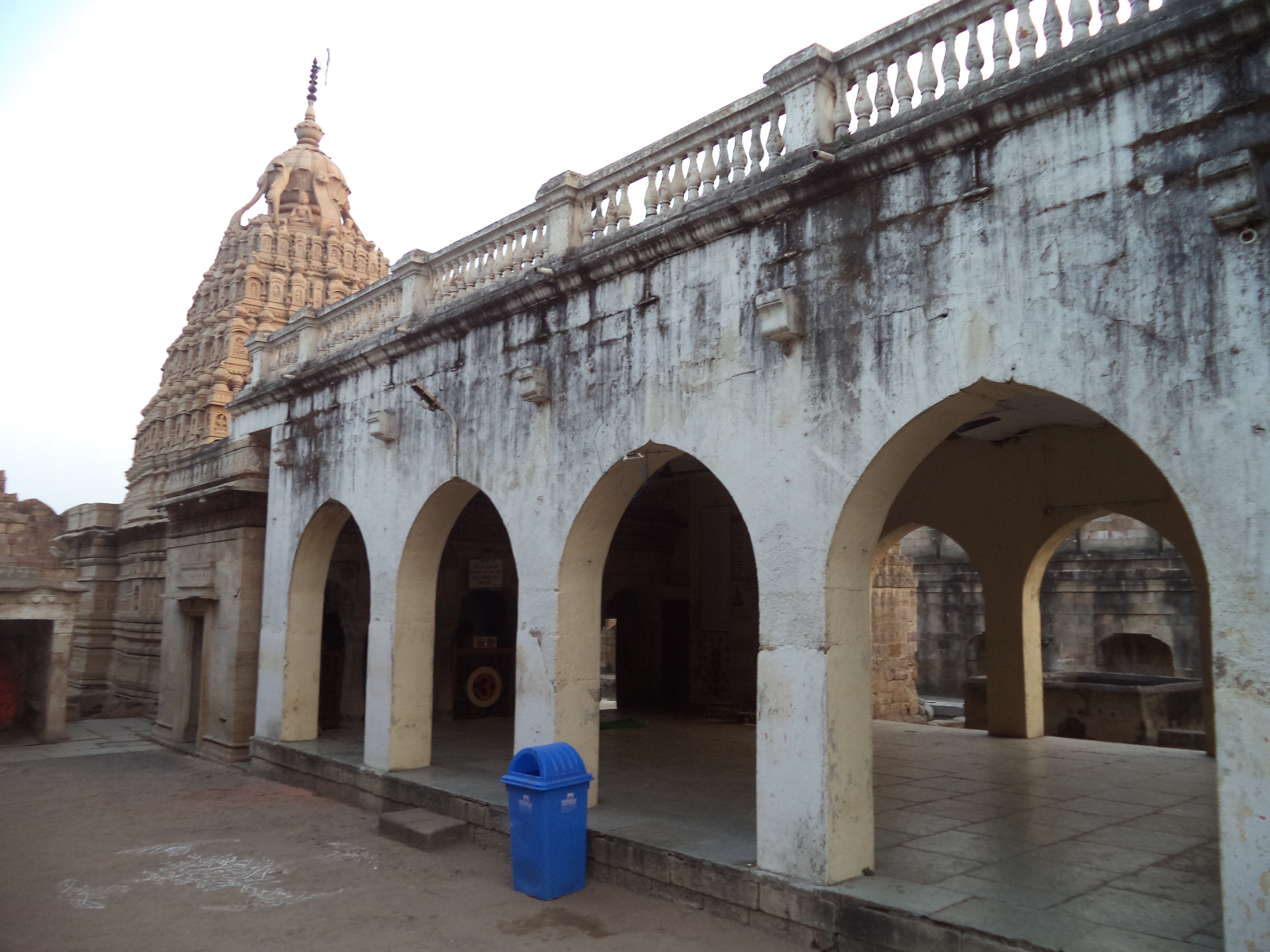
Anchaleshwar Mandir

The Anchaleshwar Mandir celebrates a form of the Lord Siva. It is situated adjoining Anchaleshwar Gate of Chandrapur fort on the banks of the Zarpat river. The official samadhi (mausoleum) of the Gond kings is located within the temple complex.

Tadoba Andhari Tiger Reserve

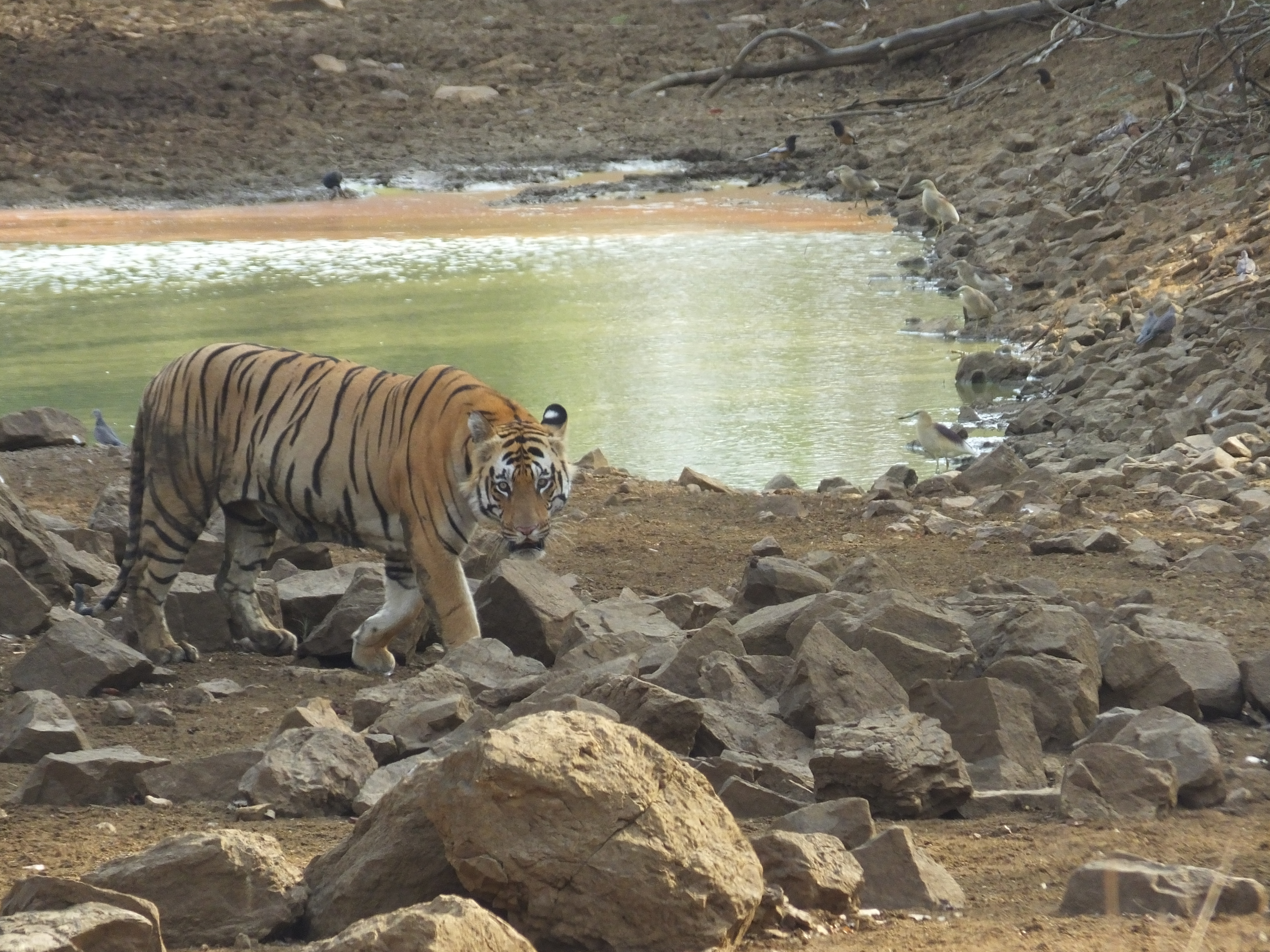
Tiger at Tadoba Andhari Tiger Reserve

The Tadoba Andhari Tiger Reserve is located approximately 30 km north of Chandrapur near the Erai dam. This park was included in the project tiger since 1973. The total area of the reserve is 625.40 km^{2}. In 2014 the tiger population in Tadoba was 66, that number has gone up to 86. Tadoba is now a home to 86 Tigers despite years of lynching, poaching & other threats. There are many hotels and resorts near Moharli gate, Zari gate and Navegaon gate of the reserve, available for the tourists. The guided tours inside the park are available during early morning and evening time only.

== Notable people ==
- Karmavir Dadasaheb Kannamwar, second Chief Minister of Maharashtra.
- Balasaheb Deshmukh, a follower of Bal Gangadhar Tilak. It was due to his efforts that Tilak visited Chandrapur and laid the foundation of Lokmanya Tilak Vidyalaya.
- Mohan Bhagwat, chief of the Rashtriya Swayamsevak Sangh.
- Hansraj Ahir, former Deputy Home Minister of India (MOS Home affairs) and also Union minister of Chemical and Fetilizers (MOS) Govt. of India.
- Shantaram Potdukhe, former Minister of Finance (MoS) of India.
- Baba Amte, Social Worker
- Barrister Rajabhau Khobragade, Deputy Chairman of Rajya Sabha, leader of the Republican Party of India (Khobragade) and follower of B. R. Ambedkar.
- Abdul Shafee, a politician of the Indian National Congress Party, MLC, 5th Loksabha.
- Sudhir Mungantiwar, former Minister of Finance & Planning and Forests Govt. of Maharastra, former Guardian Minister of Wardha and Chandrapur.
- Swagat Thorat, a wildlife photographer, playwright, painter, editor, and director. Known as the Braille Man of India.

== See also ==
- Make in India
- Urjanagar
- List of talukas in Chandrapur district
