= Vizag back-to-back HVDC converter station =

Location
- Country: India
- State: Andhra Pradesh
- Coordinates: 17°38′33″N 83°07′57″E; 17°38′26″N 83°08′10″E
- From: Eastern Region
- To: Southern Region

Ownership information
- Owner: Power Grid Corporation of India

Construction information
- Substation installer: Alstom (Vizag 1), ABB (Vizag 2)
- Commissioned: 1999, 2005

Technical information
- Type: Back to Back
- Current type: HVDC
- Total length: 0 km (0 mi)
- Capacity: 2 x 500 MW
- DC voltage: 205 kV (Vizag 1); 176 kV (Vizag 2)
- No. of poles: 2

The Vizag back-to-back HVDC station, or Visakhapatnam back-to-back HVDC station, is a back-to-back HVDC connection between the eastern and southern regions in India, located in Anakapalli district, closer to the city of Visakhapatnam, and owned by Power Grid Corporation of India.

It consists of two independent poles, each with a nominal power transmission rating of 500 MW, referred to as Vizag 1 and Vizag 2. Vizag 1 was built by Alstom between 1996 and 1999 and has nominal DC voltage and current ratings of 205 kV, 2475 A. Its design is very similar to that of the Chandrapur back-to-back HVDC converter station.

Vizag 2 was built by ABB between 2002 and 2005 and has nominal DC voltage and current ratings of 176 kV, 2841 A.

Both Vizag 1 and Vizag 2 use air-insulated, water-cooled thyristor valves.

On 31 December 2013, the Northern, Eastern and Western grids were synchronised with the Southern regional grid, creating a single synchronous AC grid over the whole of India. As a result, the converter station is no longer required for its original purpose of asynchronously linking the Eastern and Southern grids, although it can still be used as an embedded power flow device to help control power flow within the AC system. The stations could potentially be dismantled and moved to elsewhere to export/import power from other countries. Sometimes the excess power fed to the southern grid by this HVDC link is flowing back to Western region through the 765 KV AC lines between Southern grid and the Western grid which is not desired.

== Sites ==
Site	Coordinates
Vizag 1	17°38′33″N 83°07′57″E
Vizag 2	17°38′26″N 83°08′10″E

== See also ==
- Chandrapur back-to-back HVDC converter station
- HVDC Sileru–Barsoor
