= Irai Dam =

- Location within Maharashtra
- Official name: Irai Dam
- Location: Chandrapur
- Coordinates: 20.1677381°N 79.3048096°E
- Opening date: 1983
- Owners: Government of Maharashtra, India

Dam and spillways
- Type of dam: Earthfill; Gravity
- Impounds: Irai river
- Height: 30 m (98 ft)
- Length: 1,620 m (5,310 ft)
- Dam volume: 0.985 km^{3} (0.236 cu mi)

Reservoir
- Total capacity: 0.193000 km^{3} (0.046303 cu mi)
- Surface area: 58 km^{2} (22 sq mi)

Irai Dam is an earthfill and gravity dam on Irai river near Chandrapur and Tadoba Andhari Tiger Project in state of Maharashtra in India. A borderline flood situation was seen in the catchment and the low-lying areas of this dam and the nearby Chargaon dam in September 2012. The situation came under control after the rainfall stopped.

== Specifications ==
The height of the dam above lowest foundation is 30 m (98 ft) while the length is 1,620 m (5,310 ft). The volume content is 0.985 km^{3} (0.236 cu mi) and gross storage capacity is 0.226500 km^{3} (0.054340 cu mi).

== Purpose ==
- Water supply

== See also ==
- Dams in Maharashtra
- List of reservoirs and dams in India
