= Chandrapur Super Thermal Power Station =

Thermal power station in India

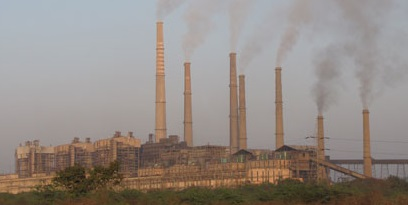
- Current functioning units of CSTPS
- Country: India
- Location: Chandrapur, Maharashtra (state)
- Coordinates: 20.004968°N 79.291334°E
- Status: Operational
- Commission date: 8 October 1983
- Operator: Maharashtra State Power Generation Company Limited

Thermal power station
- Primary fuel: Coal

Power generation
- Units operational: 7
- Nameplate capacity: 3340 MW

External links
- Commons: Related media on Commons

Chandrapur Super Thermal Power Station (often abbreviated as CSTPS) is a thermal power plant located in Chandrapur district in the Indian state of Maharashtra. The power plant is one of the coal based power plants of MAHAGENCO. The coal for the power plant is sourced from Durgapur and Padmapur Collieries of Western Coalfields Limited. The plant was officially inaugurated by the Prime Minister Indira Gandhi on 8 October 1984.

With the total capacity of 3340 MW, the plant is the largest power plant in the Maharashtra. It accounts for more than 25% of Maharashtra's total needs. The plant gets water supply from Erai Dam when in normal conditions. In the summer of 2010 due to less water in Erai, the plant also got water supply from Chargaon Dam.

== Capacity ==
Stage	Unit number	Installed capacity (MW)	Date of commissioning
1st	1	210	1983 August
1st	2	210	1984 July
1st	3	210	1985 May
1st	4	210	1986 March
2nd	5	500	1991 March
2nd	6	500	1992 March
2nd	7	500	1997 October
3rd	8	500	2015 May
3rd	9	500	2016 March
Total	9	3340	

== Gallery ==
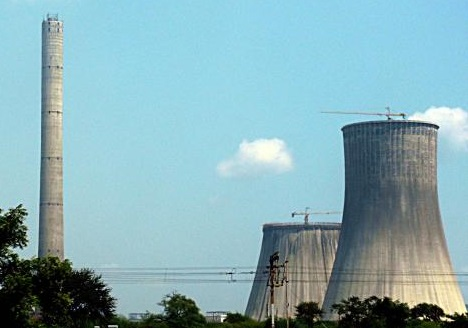
New 2 units of CSTPS

== See also ==
- Make in Maharashtra
