= Borivali-Padgha =

Village in Maharashtra

Borivali-Padgha Padghe
- village
- Location in Maharashtra, India Borivali-Padgha (India)
- Coordinates: 19.3700971°N 73.1755871°E
- Country: India
- State: Maharashtra
- District: Thane

Government
  - Type: Gram Panchayat

Population
  - Total: Approximately 15,000
- Time zone: UTC+5:30 (IST)
- PIN: 421101
- Vehicle registration: Thane MH - 04
- Literacy: 85%
- Vidhan Sabha constituency: Bhiwandi (Gramin)

Borivali-Padgha and Mumbai shown in the map of Maharashtra.

Borivali-Padgha is a twin village in Bhiwandi Taluka in Thane District of Maharashtra State, India. It belongs to Konkan region. It is located 35 km towards East from District Thane. It is 18 km from textile manufacturing city Bhiwandi, 23 km from Railway Junction Kalyan, 35 km district headquarters Thane and 59 km from Maharashtra State capital Mumbai.

Borivali-Padgha Pin code is 421101 and postal head office is in Padgha. The villages are located at NH3. The villages are surrounded by the slopes of Mahuli Hills.

Kurund 2 km, Devli 2 km, Rahur 3 km, Dohle Taloli & Sape 4 km, Khadavli 6 km and Raya 8 km are the nearby villages. The nearest Railway station is Khadavli which is 6 km far and situated in the Central Railway Asangaon Kasara Railway Line. The nearest International Airport is Chhatrapati Shivaji International Airport which is 53 km far.

Borivali Village has 90% Kokani Muslim population and remaining are Buddhist and Adivasi. The Padgha village has 80% Hindu and remaining are Buddhist and Muslims. The terminus station of the eponymous Chandrapur–Padghe HVDC transmission system or which is also called as MSEB is located there.

5 of its citizens were accused of carrying out the 2002 bus bombings and March 2003 bomb blasts in Mumbai.

In December 2023, 15 people from Borivali-Padgha were arrested by the National Investigative Agency for allegedly supporting and conducting activities for ISIS.
