= Sumaira Abdulali =

Indian environmentalist, activist (born 1961)

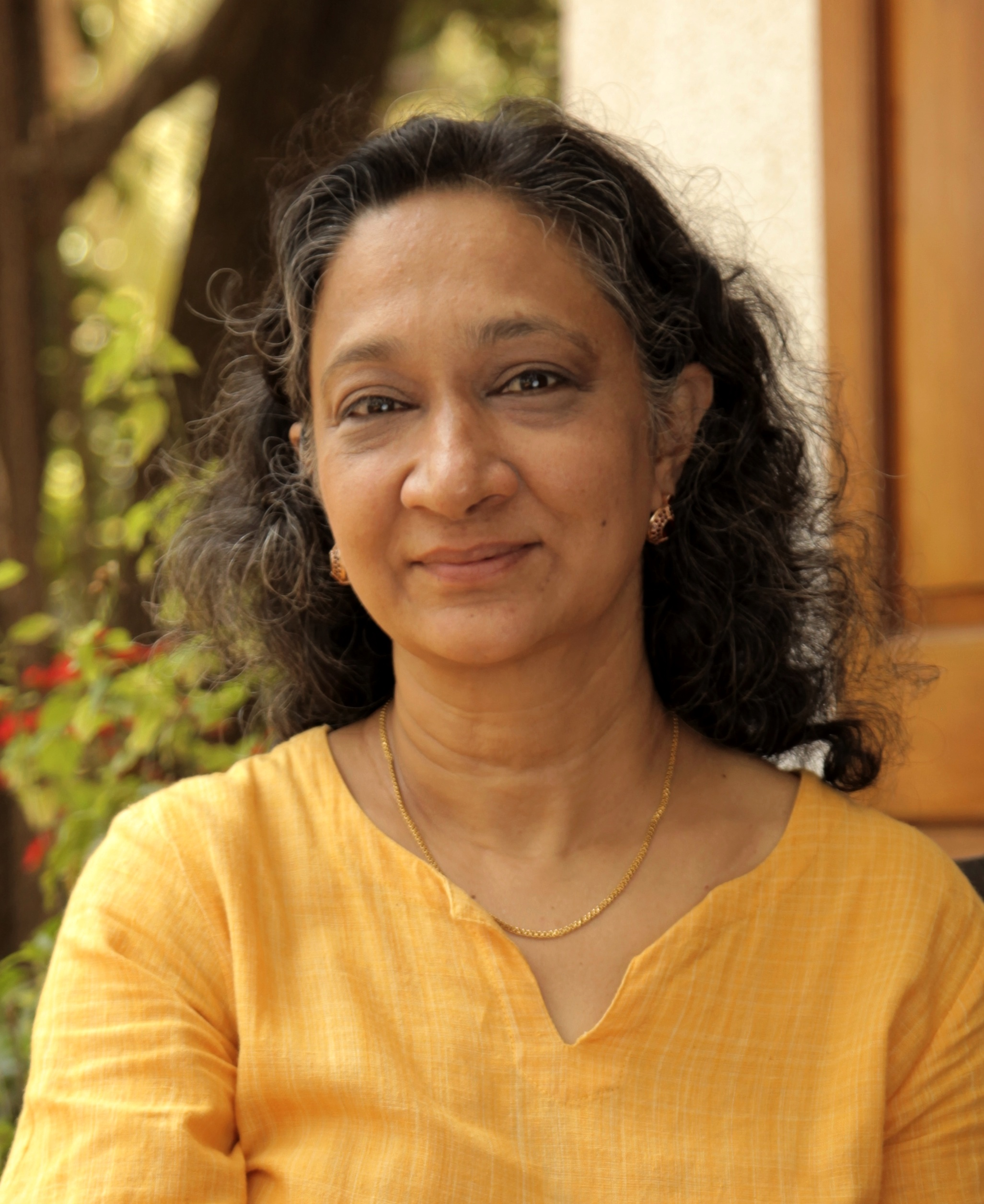
- Born: 22 May 1961 (age 65); Mumbai, India
- Known for: Awaaz Foundation, MITRA
- Relatives: Salim Ali, Humayun Abdulali, Zafar Futehally, Tyabji family (maternal)
- Awards: Mother Teresa Awards, Ashoka Fellow
- Scientific career
- Fields: Environmentalism, wildlife conservation, noise pollution, sand mining
- Workplaces: Bombay Natural History Society

Sumaira Abdulali (born 22 May 1961) is an environmentalist from Mumbai, India, founder of the NGO Awaaz Foundation and convenor of the Movement against Intimidation, Threat and Revenge against Activists (MITRA). She was co-chairman of the Conservation Subcommittee and honorary secretary of Asia's oldest and largest environmental NGO, the Bombay Natural History Society, and was a Governing Council Member between 2008 and 2021.

Through legal interventions, advocacy and public campaigns, contribution to documentary films, television debates and press articles, she has successfully mainstreamed and built consciousness about previously unknown environmental hazards, notably noise pollution and sand mining, and is a Governing Council and has won national and international awards for her work. She also set up the first network for protection of activists in India after an attack on her by the sand mafia in 2004.

She has been referred to as "one of India's foremost environmental activists."

== Activism ==
=== Noise pollution ===
Sumaira Abdulali has been called the Indian 'Minister of Noise' by Government officers and by the press.

In 2003, Abdulali filed public interest litigation in coordination with the Bombay Environment Action Group, Dr. Yeshwant Oke and Dr. Prabhakar Rao in the Bombay High Court demanding the demarcation of silence zones. Seven years later, in 2009, the Bombay High Court directed the Brihanmumbai Municipal Corporation to demarcate 2,237 silence zones extending 100 metres around hospitals, educational institutions, courts and religious institutions.

In 2006, Abdulali founded Awaaz Foundation, a registered public trust to support her work in environmentalism, named for the Marathi and Hindi word for "noise". She has continued her campaign against noise pollution through litigation, advocacy and awareness programs with pro bono help from legal and advertising professionals and through volunteers. Professionals such as Ishwar Nankani of Nankani and Associates and Josy Paul of BBDO India have been an integral part of her campaign.

In 2007, she filed another petition with the Awaaz Foundation for control of noise from horns, vehicular traffic, construction activities, firecrackers, for a noise map of Mumbai city integrated into its Development Plan and for strict and impartial implementation of the Noise Pollution Rules. In 2016 the High Court heard the PIL and passed final orders to control noise from all these sources, for the State of Maharashtra to conduct noise mapping studies in all cities of Maharashtra and to integrate the noise mapping of Mumbai into its draft Development Plan for the next 25 years. The Court also clarified that their orders would apply to events and festivities of all religions and issued Contempt Notices to Government and Police officers who had failed to implement their orders. Mumbai, which was declared the noisiest city in India in January 2016 was the only city in India where noise levels declined from previous years during the festival season 2016. The Mumbai Police thanked citizens of Mumbai through a statement for making this happen.

Abdulali has advocated the impartial application of Noise Rules from all sources including from all religions and sections of society. In 2016 the Bombay High Court, while passing its order, re confirmed that Noise Rules are applicable equally to all religions and religious places. She has measured noise levels at political rallies for several years, including the annual Dussehra Rally of the Shiv Sena at Shivaji Park, prompting their leader, Bal Thackeray to call her the 'Awaaz lady' and challenging her to control his decibel levels, which he compared to the roar of a tiger. Based on her findings, the Mumbai Police filed criminal cases against the rally organizers.

In 2010, she wrote to the Ministry of Environment and Forests (MoEF) for more stringent Noise Rules and the need for national data on noise pollution. The MoEF amended the Noise Rules in January 2010 incorporating all her suggestions and also announced a National Noise Monitoring Network of the Central Pollution Control Board in India. She opposed the use of private helipads atop rooftops in Mumbai. In 2010, the State Government gave permission for rooftop helipads on Sea Wind and Antilia, homes of two of India's richest men, Mukesh Ambani and Anil Ambani. Following her signature campaign, the MoEF said such helipads were 'avoidable' and their use would not be permitted in any Indian city. In 2016 the Bombay High Court re confirmed that the Government would have to consider additional noise pollution from private helipads before giving any permissions.

The State Government of Maharashtra issued a circular in 2015 banning the use of 'Horn OK Please' signage on the rear side of commercial vehicles across Maharashtra on the grounds that it encourages motorists to honk unnecessarily and leads to noise pollution.

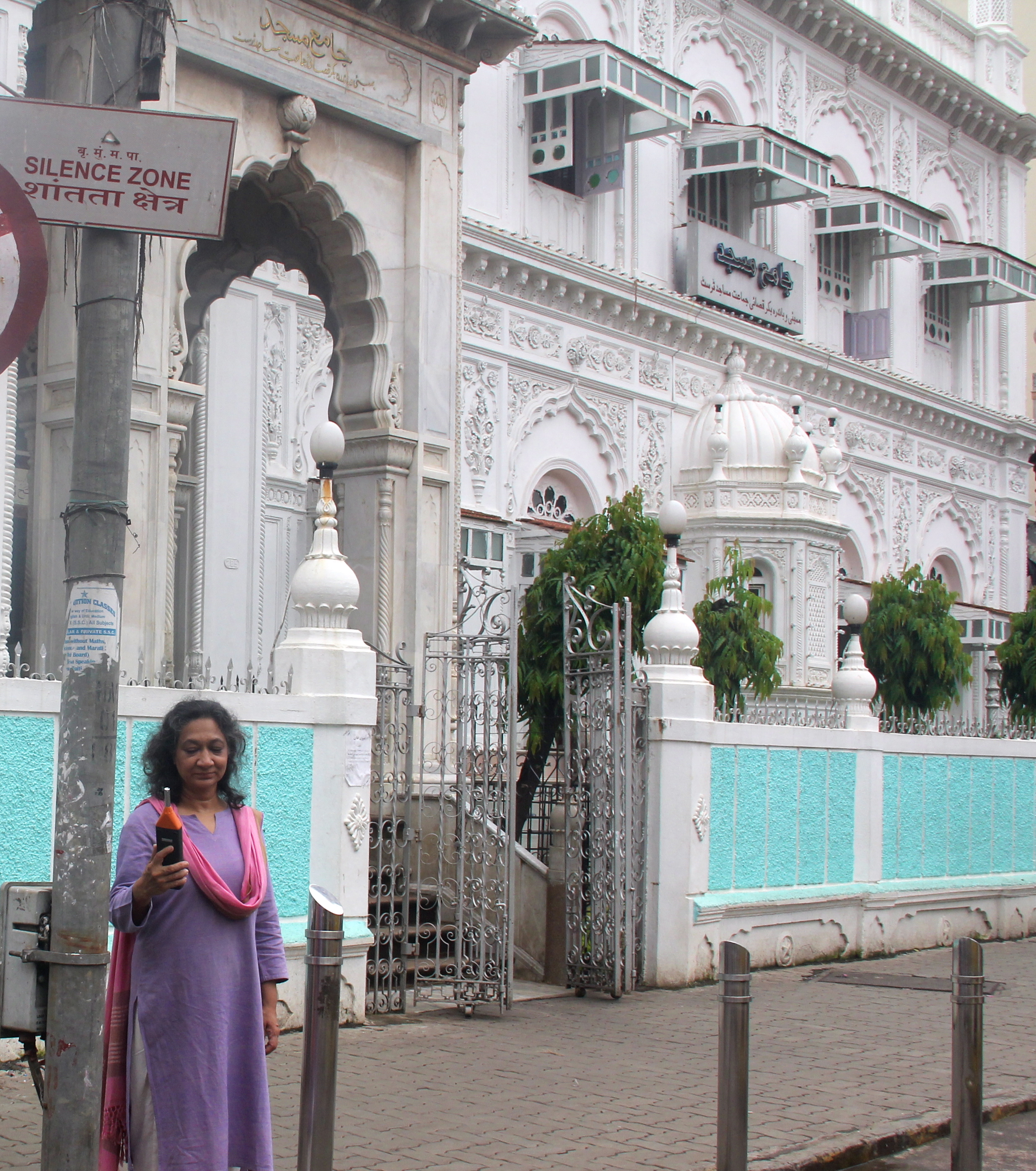
Sumaira Abdulali recording noise under a Silence Zone board at a religious place

She was a member of the Maharashtra Pollution Control Board Committee to determine appropriate decibel levels restrictions on horns and sirens. The recommendations were notified by the State Government as law and confirmed by a Bombay High Court Order in August 2016.

In 2017, based on Abdulali's data, the Bombay High Court issued Contempt Notices to officers of the Mahim Police Station and the Municipal Commissioner, Mumbai for violation of Noise Rules. In 2018, under directions of the Bombay High Court during compliance hearings NEERI carried out noise mapping of all 27 major cities of Maharashtra, the first comprehensive official studies in the country. In 2018, she measured noise from the Mumbai Metro construction and partnered with the Government in a year-long campaign against honking. The Government banned DJs during festivals and the festival season was the quietest on record in recent years.

=== Sand mining ===
Sumaira Abdulali has been referred to as "India's foremost campaigner against illegal sand mining" by the Press and has opposed illegal sand mining through advocacy and legal interventions since 2003, when she noticed it outside her ancestral home at Kihim Beach in Alibag. In May 2004, a confrontation with illegal sand mining on Kihim Beach ended with illegal sand miners, purported to include the son of a local Indian National Congress leader, physically assaulting her and damaging her car.

Following the encounter, Abdulali filed a First Information Report with the police, who, after investigation, charged four individuals with attacking her and arrested them. In 2011, a district court acquitted all four individuals on grounds of insufficient evidence.

Abdulali's Awaaz Foundation filed the first public interest litigation in the country against illegal sand mining in 2006. After numerous hearings, and independent investigation through Court Commissioners in all coastal districts of Maharashtra, the Bombay High Court passed interim orders banning illegal sand mining in coastal areas. In 2010, The High Court extended the ban on sand extraction across the state of Maharashtra.

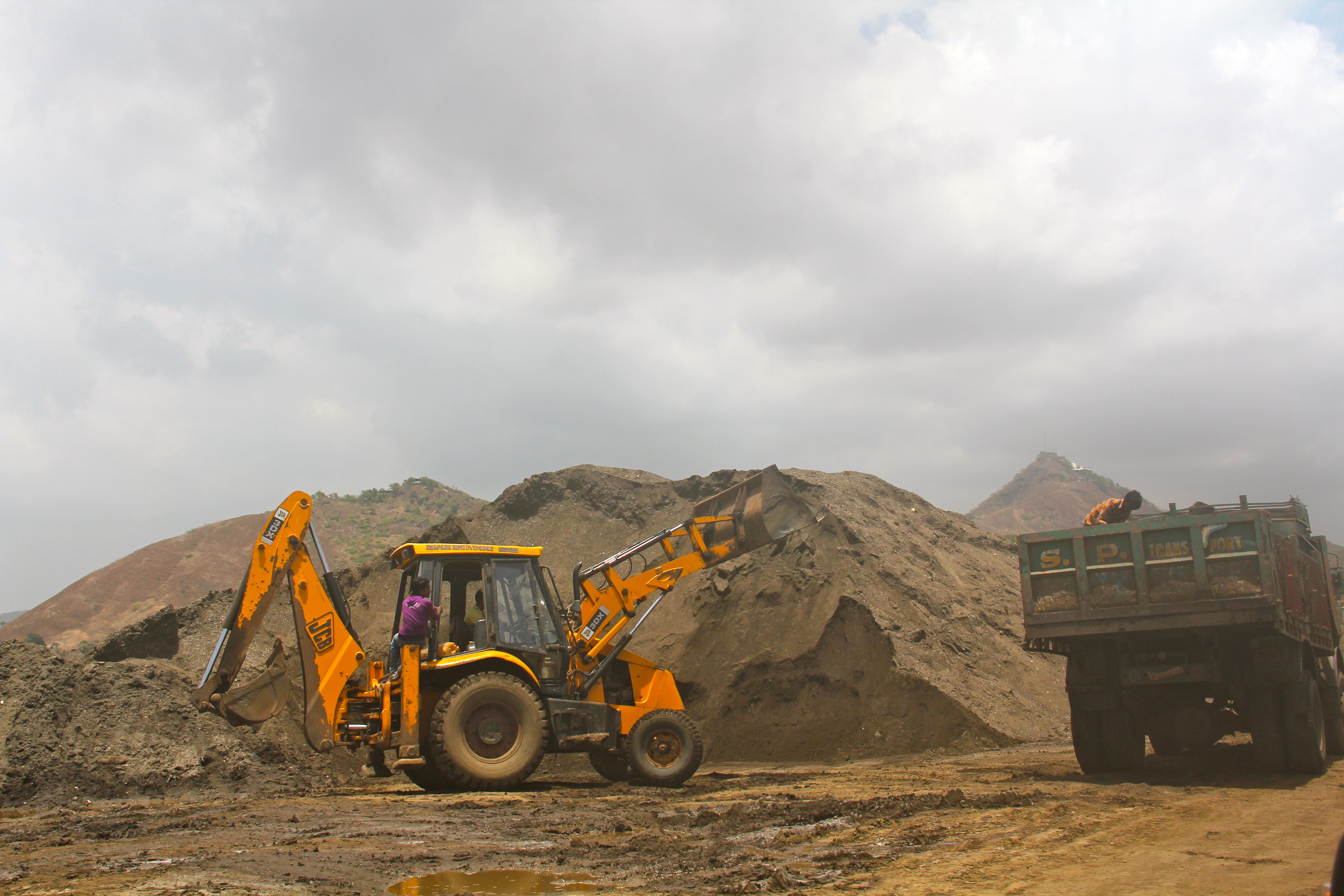
Loading illegally dredged sand

After the ban came into force, in 2010, Abdulali, along with journalists and local activists, traveled to Bankot creek in the Raigad district of Maharashtra to document photographic evidence of ongoing illegal sand mining. After surveying the site and recording purportedly illegal activity on video, Abdulali and her associates say that their car was pursued through a lonely area and struck by another vehicle driven by the sand mafia.

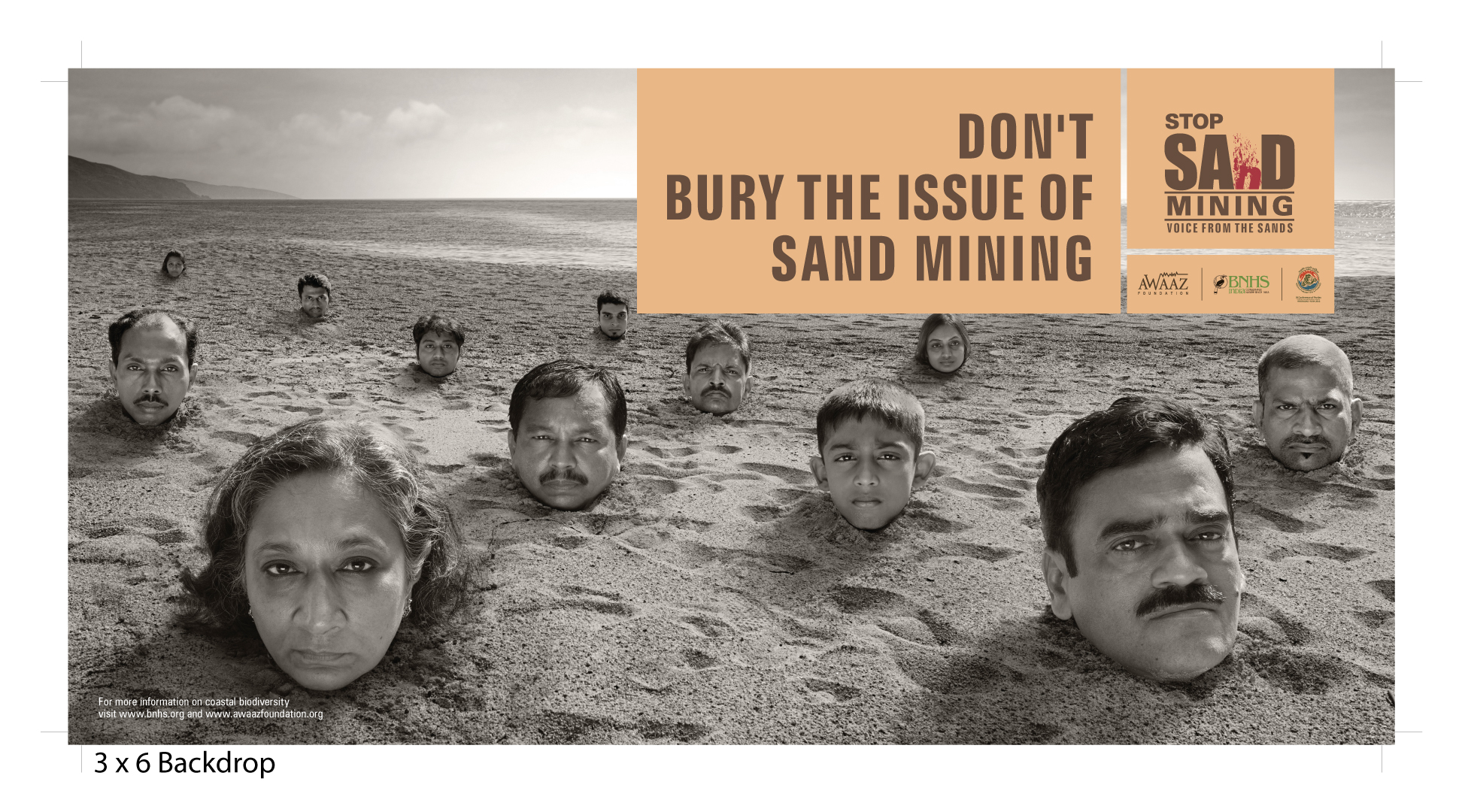
Coastal sand mining side event at CBD CoP11

The Police filed an FIR for attempted murder against the attackers. During case hearings at Mahad, she was threatened and intimidated by the accused.

In October 2012, India hosted the 11th Conference of Parties of the United Nations Convention on Biological Diversity in Hyderabad, India. Awaaz Foundation and the Bombay Natural History Society presented a side event on sand mining, the first such event in any International Conference. Since sand mining did not form a part of the agenda of the CBD in spite of being a crucial issue to protect coastal environment, she wrote to their technical Committee, SBSSTA to include it in future formal Agendas. On 2 October 2016 she met Mr Erik Solheim, Under-Secretary-General of the United Nations and executive director of the United Nations Environment Programme and once again requested him to put sand mining, international trade in illegally mined sand and recycling of debris, plastics and industrial waste for construction on the global agenda of the UNDP. In October 2018, she was invited as keynote speaker in the first UNEP Roundtable on sand mining in Geneva and presented virtually on the need for International policies to govern extraction of sand and international trade in sand and the need for mainstreaming technology to recycle plastics and other waste materials for building aggregates to replace natural sand. In May 2019 the UNEP released its report based on the roundtable in which Awaaz Foundation's work on illegal sand mining was featured throughout the report.

Abdulali participated in the production of the 2012 documentary Sand Wars, which focuses on sand mining and its damaging environmental impacts across the world. The film won numerous International Awards and inspired the United Nations Environment Programme (UNEP) to publish a Global Environmental Alert in March 2014 titled "Sand: Rarer Than One Thinks". After a screening of the film in Mumbai in January 2014, she conducted an awareness campaign along with Denis Delestrac at Juhu Beach 'Don't Bury the Issue of Sand Mining.' The campaign won the Spikes Asia Silver Award for "public relations and lobbying".

In May 2014, the National Green Tribunal (to whom the public interest litigation of 2006 files by Awaaz Foundation had been transferred) passed a final order and in 2015 the State Government of Maharashtra issued a new sand mining policy in accordance with NGT Orders. The Ministry of Environment, Forest and Climate Change of the Union Government too issued national 'Sustainable Sand Mining Guidelines" based on the Maharashtra model.

Abdulali has advocated that construction debris and plastics, currently dumped in landfills should be recycled as building aggregate. She has opposed the use of crushed stone as a substitute to natural sand for construction, as it involves breaking down of mountains to extract stone.

In August 2016, a road bridge at Mahad collapsed, killing the occupants of vehicles on the bridge. This bridge was in the vicinity of sand mining sites where Abdulali had been attacked by the sand mafia in 2010. She wrote to Shri Devendra Fadnavis, Chief Minister of Maharashtra to investigate the role of sand mining in the collapse and drawing to his attention that other bridges including the Vaitarna Railway Bridge, a main line northwards of Mumbai, was threatened. Without conducting any investigations, Minister of State for Home (Rural) Deepak Vasant Kesarkar ruled out the possibility that sand mining was responsible for the Mahad bridge collapse.

=== Open-pit mining ===
In 2011, Abdulali filed public interest litigation to oppose leases issued by the Government of Maharashtra to allow open-pit mining in the Sawantwadi-Dodamarg corridor of the Western Ghats. Abdulali and others argued that such mining would have a disruptive effect on local wildlife in the biodiverse Sawantwadi-Dodamarg corridor, which provides a habitat for such endangered species as leopards and tigers. Abdulali filed a public interest litigation requesting that the area be declared an Ecologically Sensitive Area (ESA) and a zero mining policy be applied in the area. In 2013, the Bombay High Court granted the Sawantwadi-Dodamarg corridor ESA status and issued an order that the government impose a moratorium on mining activities in the area to preserve biodiversity.

== Protection of activists ==
Following the 2004 alleged assault on Abdulali by "sand mafia" in Kihim, Abdulali joined with other NGOs and activists in founding the Movement against Intimidation, Threat and Revenge against Activists (MITRA). MITRA has taken up the issue of attacks against activists with the Bombay High Court and with the State Government.

== Documentary films ==
Abdulali participated in the following documentary films:

- In 2017 "Line in the Sand" directed by Bronwen Reed and Savitri Chaudhry and produced by the Australian Broadcasting Corporation.
- In 2013 Sand Wars directed by Denis Delestrac, winner of numerous International Awards for best Documentary Film.
- In 2004 in a short film "Is God Deaf?" about noise pollution in the name of religion directed by Sanjivan Lal for Doordarshan.
- In 2002 in Zara Suniye Toh, 4 part an awareness documentary on Noise Pollution of 6 minutes each directed by Gautam Benegal, produced by Mumbai Metropolitan Region Development Authority (MMRDA).
