= Awaaz Foundation =

Charitable trust in India

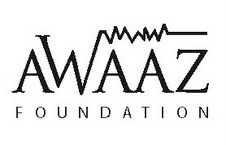
- Formation: 2006
- Type: Non-governmental organisation
- Legal status: Charitable Trust
- Headquarters: Mumbai
- Region served: India
- President of Foundation: Sumaira Abdulali
- Website: www.awaazfoundation.org

Awaaz Foundation (meaning "the organisation against sound" – "Awaaz" means "sound" in Urdu) is a charitable trust and non-governmental organisation in Mumbai, India, which builds awareness, carries out advocacy, and is involved in educational projects to protect the environment and prevent environmental pollution. It has impacted many important decisions by the government and influenced policy making in important environmental matters in India. The beneficiaries of the Foundation are the citizens of India at large.

Awaaz Foundation was founded on 21 February 2006 by Sumaira Abdulali, a well-known environmentalist, who has exposed many scandals of environmental villainy in India at personal risk. The Foundation has filed several public interest litigations, including demands for strict implementation of noise pollution laws, better functioning of Mumbai's Tree Authority, reducing noise pollution, banning sale of tobacco to minors, efforts to counter the politically sponsored sand mining mafia and recognition of the biodiverse Sawantwadi-Dodamarg wildlife corridor as an ecologically sensitive area.

== Noise pollution ==
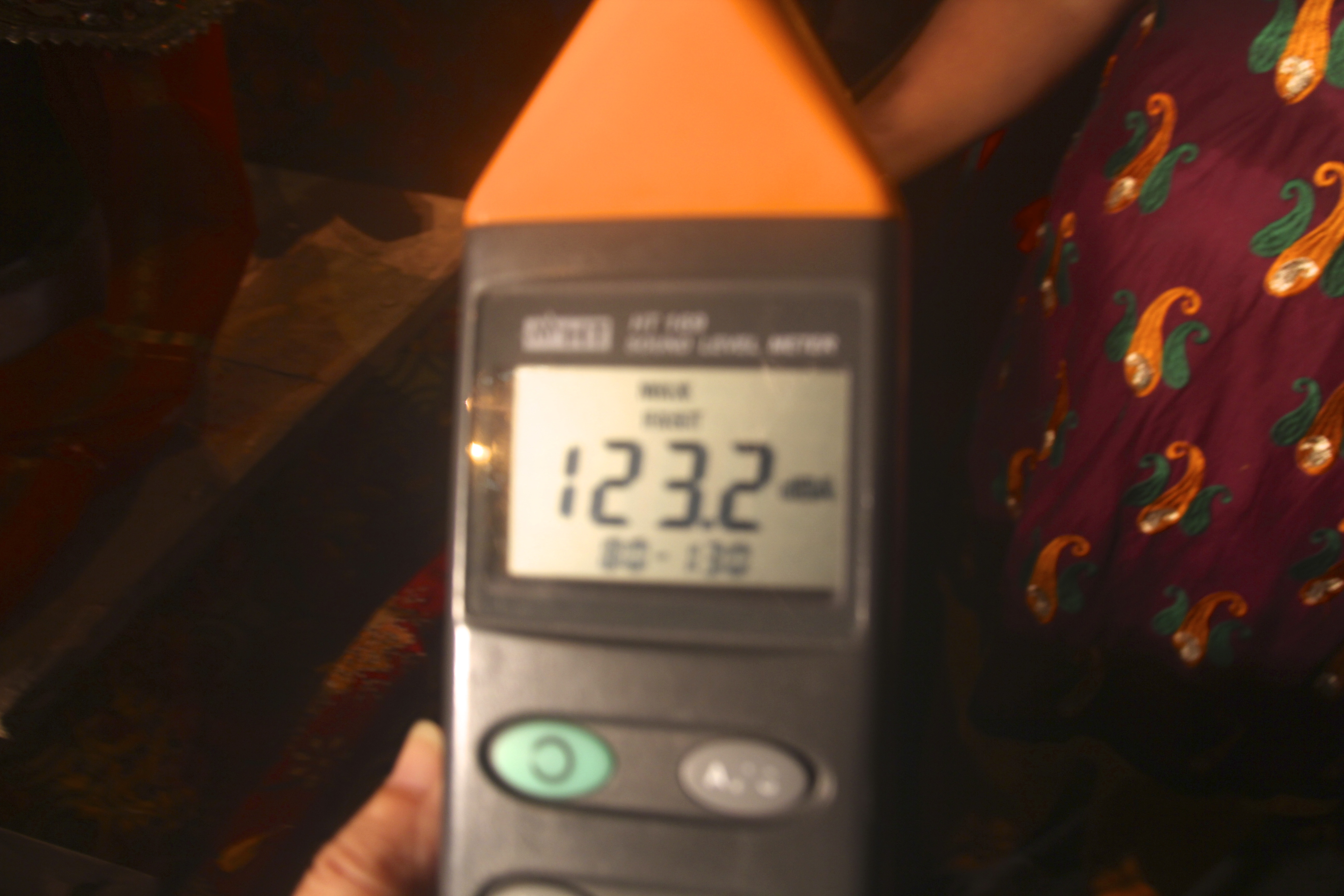
Indian festivals, increasingly commercialised and politicised, are becoming louder and show record peak levels in spite of increased public awareness and better implementation of time limits following Court Orders.

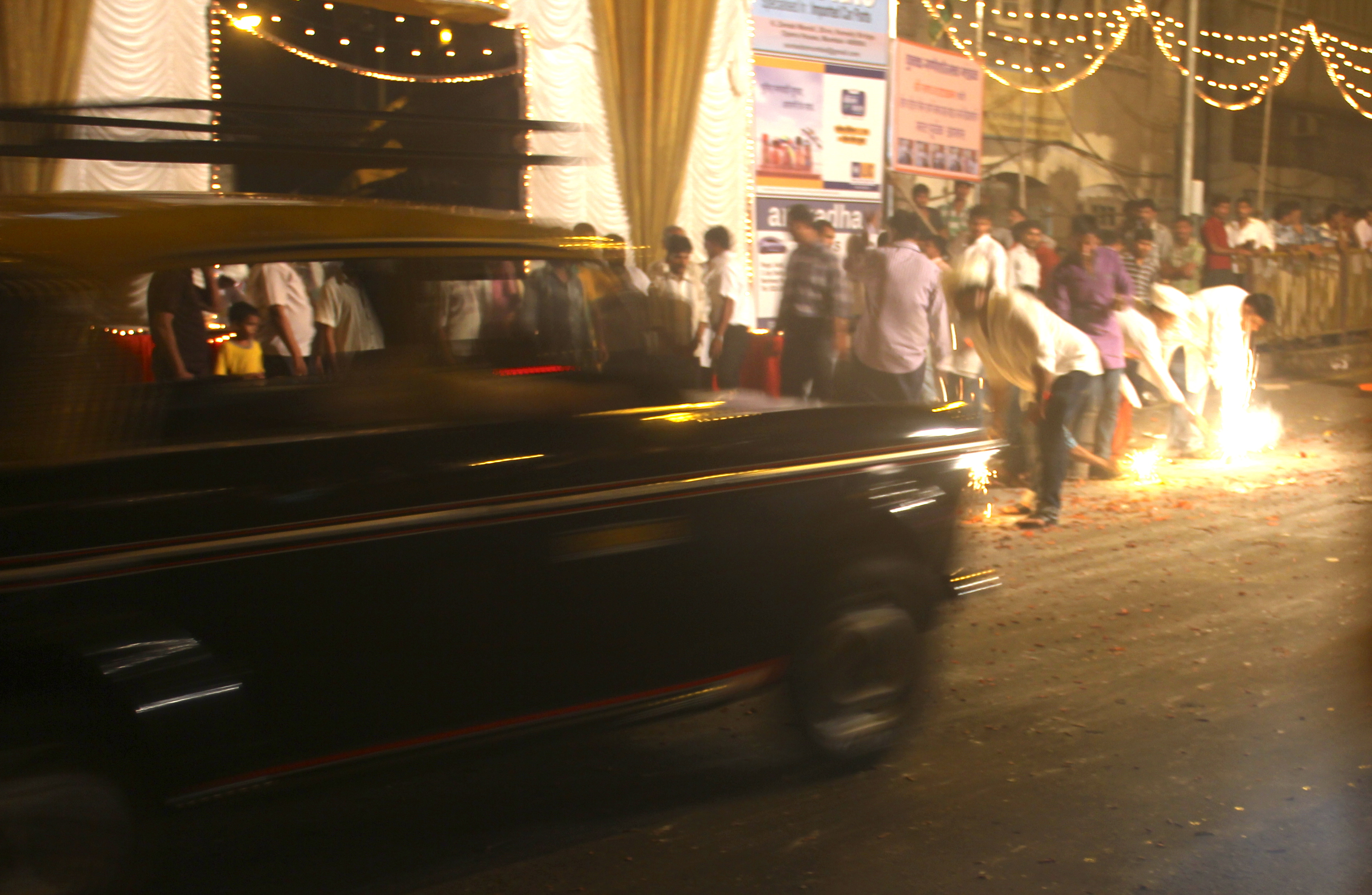
Use of firecrackers is increasing and they are now used round the year for every kind of celebration including weddings, cricket matches, Hindu, Muslim and Christian festivals and other miscellaneous events. These firecrackers are being lighted on public roads with traffic passing over them momentarily.

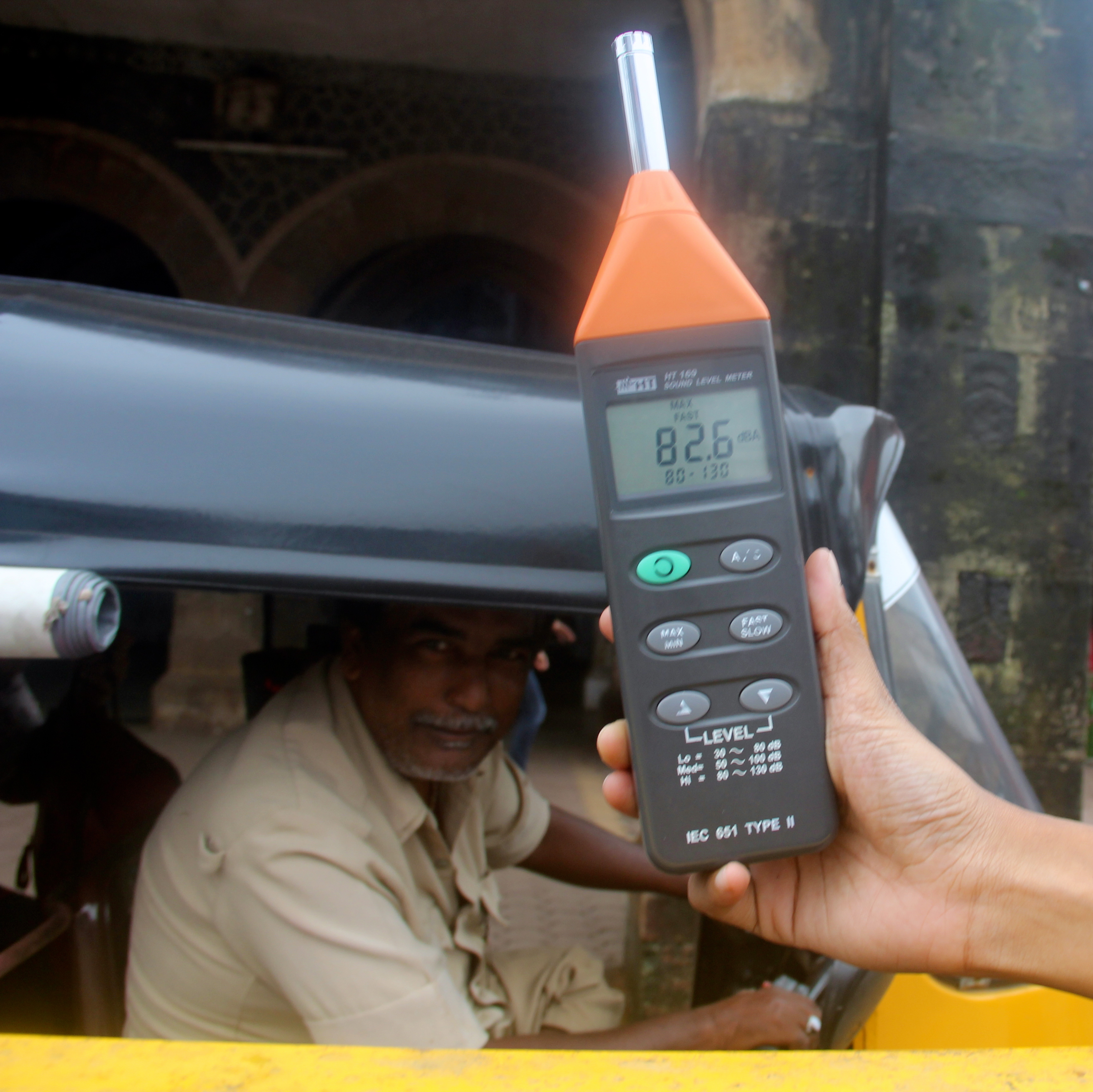
Mumbai is the noisiest city in the world and traffic is a continuous source of noise. An auto rickshaw in Mumbai measures 82.6 dB during this recording by Awaaz Foundation

Noise pollution is a serious health hazard and can cause annoyance and aggression, hypertension, high stress levels, tinnitus, hearing loss, sleep disturbances, heart disease, mental illness and other serious effects on health. Like smoking, noise pollution affects active and passive recipients when noise levels cross certain safe boundaries. Anti-Social behaviour such as public use of firecrackers and loudspeakers is a highly sensitive social issue in India.

Among the major forms of pollution in India is noise pollution. There is no parallel in the world to the noise pollution generated during festivals and religious celebrations in India. For Indians, making noise is a sign of happiness. For politicians the ability to make a big noise, by using huge loudspeakers at any opportunity, is a sign of strength. Festivals in India have become political battlegrounds as politicians try to score brownie points over one another by attempting to host the noisiest festival. The use of loudspeakers, permitted by the courts on certain occasions, often exceeds the permissible decibel limit, causing a great deal of stress and anxiety to the neighbourhoods.

Awaaz Foundation has advocated against noise pollution from various sources and has conducted campaigns to create awareness of adverse health effects from noise in a methodical and scientific manner. The various noise pollution campaigns of the Foundation have received widespread public support and turned into a public movement in Mumbai followed by the rest of the country. Increased awareness and vigilance of citizens has resulted in policy change, better systems and better implementation of Noise Rules.

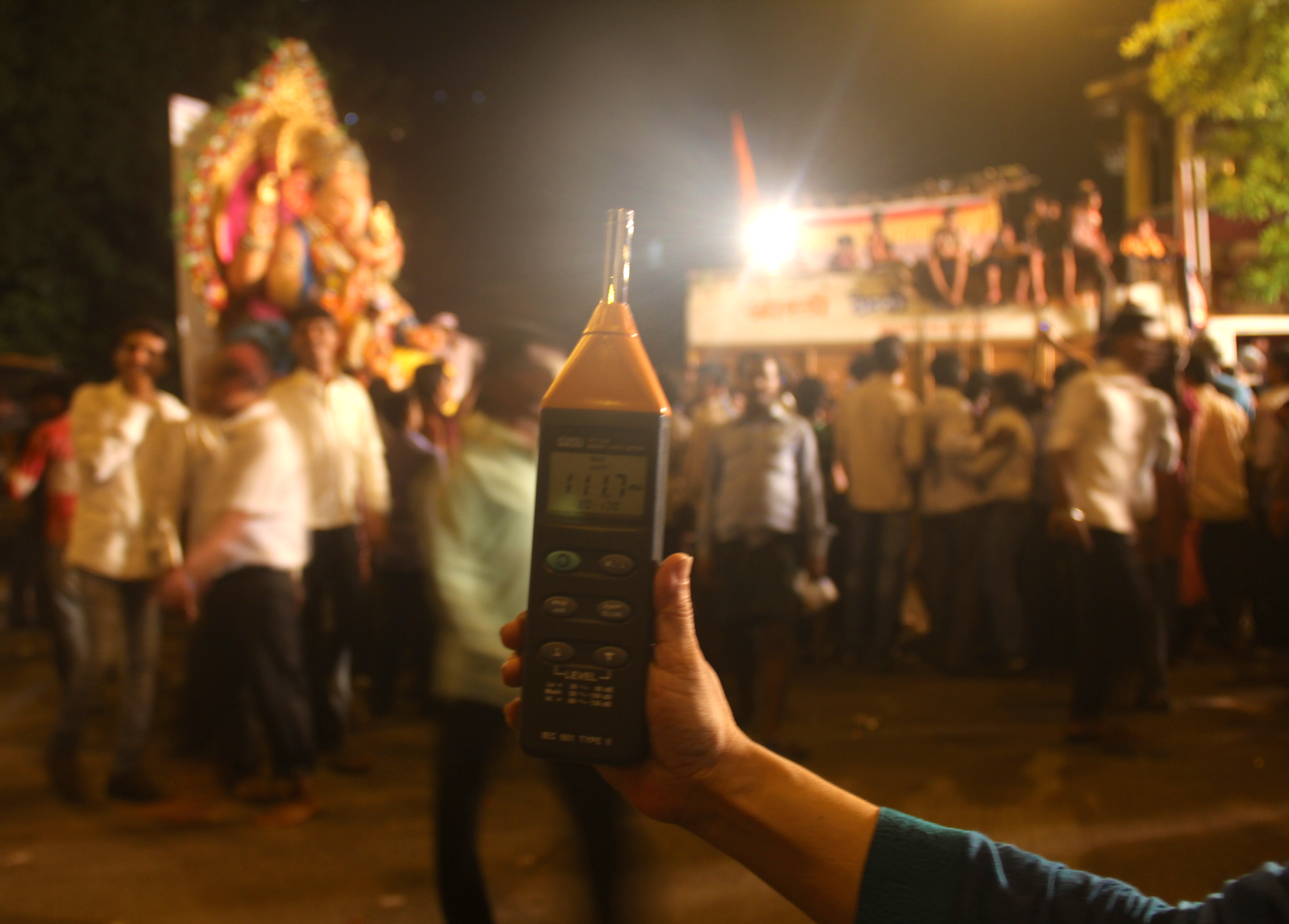
Awaaz Foundation has measured noise levels from myriad sources including festivals, traffic, construction and religious places. This is a measurement during Ganpati 2013, the loudest festival in Mumbai.

Awaaz Foundation systematically collected noise pollution data for the first time in India, collated and presented it to the State and Union Governments, Courts, police and citizens. Data was generated of noise levels at major events since 2003, from sources including firecrackers, traffic, loudspeakers, industrial equipment and construction.

In 2010 Awaaz Foundation tested noise levels of helicopters after several leading Industrialists applied for permission to build private helipads atop their residential buildings in densely populated areas of Mumbai. After the data was presented in court, permission to use private helipads in all urban areas of India were banned by the MoEF.

Also based on data presented to MoEF during the pendency of the public interest litigation in the Bombay High Court, Government of India's Ministry of Environment and Forests accepted all recommendations by Awaaz Foundation on 11 January 2010 for stricter noise laws in the country and issued a new notification to ban use of loudspeakers, musical instruments and honking in the areas demarcated as silence zones, including areas around religious places throughout India.

The MoEF denied permission to the State Government of Maharashtra to permit private helipads for personal use of individuals atop residential buildings and included other sources of noise such as traffic and construction noise within the ambit of the Rules for the first time.

Awaaz foundation filed a Public Interest Litigation on 12 November 2007 in Mumbai High Court seeking implementation of Noise Pollution Rules, 2000, which contemplate creation of silence zones around educational places, courts, hospitals and religious places as well.

In 2009 the Bombay High Court accepted the need for implementation of stricter noise laws and ordered the State Government to implement Noise Pollution regulation rules notified by 'Central Pollution board', (one of the Subordinate and statutory bodies) of Government of India's Ministry of Environment and Forests. Consequent to the Bombay High Court Order, the State Government of Maharashtra initially notified and asked municipal bodies in the state to demarcate an area of 100 metres (330 ft) around educational institutions, hospitals and courts as silence zones but left out the areas surrounding religious places as silence zones. Awaaz Foundation once again petitioned the Court to have these places notified as silence zones. On 6 August 2009, the principal secretary of the Home Department, Government of Maharashtra in an affidavit told the court that about 1,313 religious places had been identified in the city of Mumbai and the BMC would put up Silence zone boards within three months.

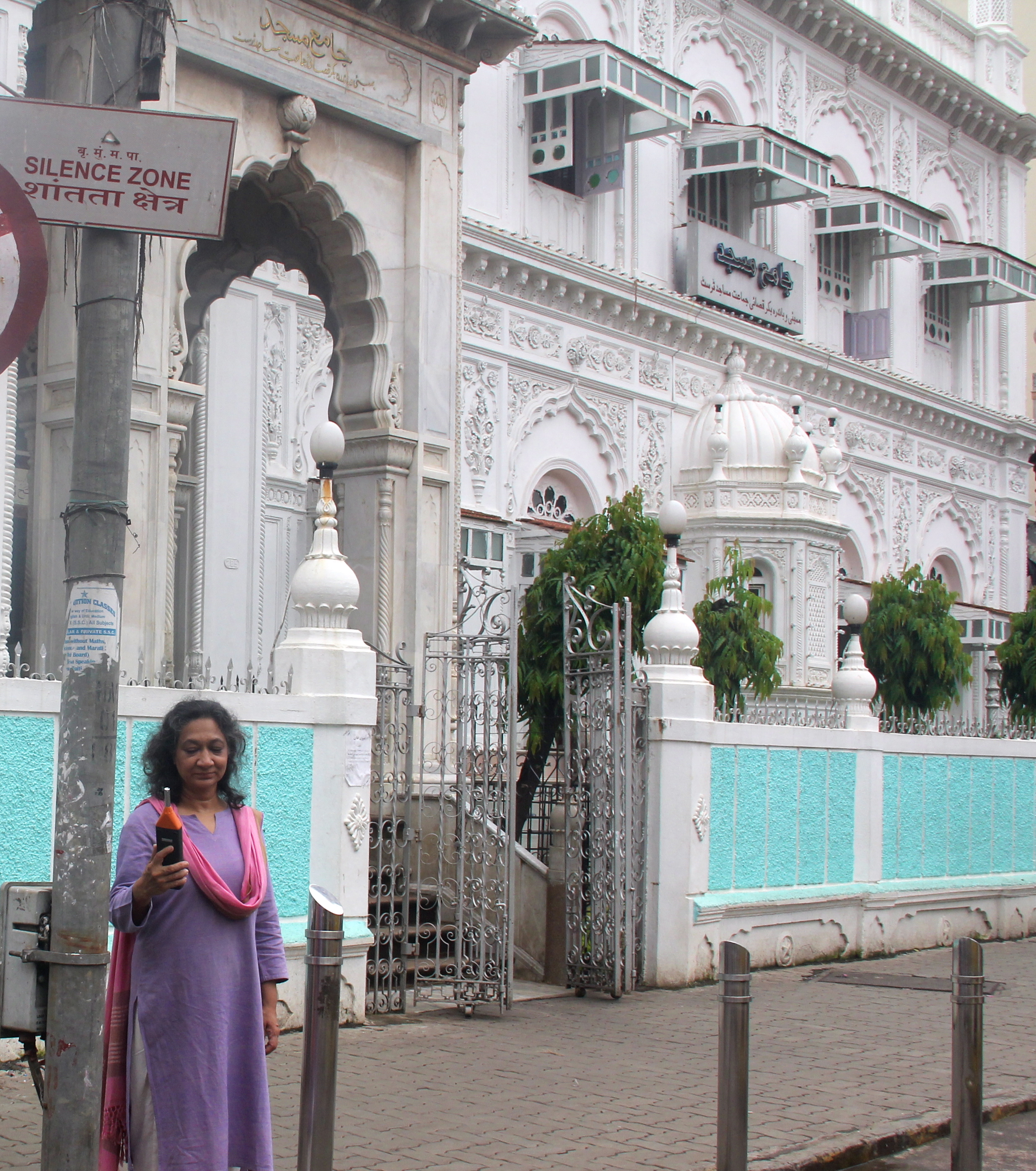
Sumaira Abdulali recording noise under a Silence Zone board at a religious place

Finally on 20 Aug 2009 principal secretary (appeals and security) Government of Maharashtra Mr. Anna Dani filed an affidavit stating that a supplementary notification has been issued to include all religious places in silence zone, and has been circulated to all civic bodies in the state.

Awaaz Foundation's advocacy against noise pollution in India motivated the Government of India to make rules and implement them. Awaaz Foundation has successfully petitioned both local and state governments in India to impose stricter noise pollution laws. Under the Environment Protection Act, in which the new Noise Pollution Rules are framed, violation of the rules is punishable with a Jail term of up to five years and fine of ₹100,000 (US$1,100).

Firecrackers, initially used mainly during the Diwali Festival, are now used to celebrate almost any occasion including weddings, cricket matches, and festivals of every community. Awaaz Foundation tested the noise levels of firecrackers along with the Maharashtra Pollution Control Board in 2008, 2010, 2012 and 2013. The noise level of almost all crackers exceeded 100 dB and some varieties consistently exceeded 125 dB. Firecracker packaging did not disclose details of noise levels or chemical content or even the year of manufacture; the Petroleum and Explosives Safety Organisation (PESO) who is the Authority to check firecrackers at the stage of manufacture and the Arms and Explosives Department of the Mumbai Police who license firecracker vendors did not take action for many years following complaints of violations. In 2012, Awaaz Foundation, under Right to Information, obtained an Order to disclose details of all firecrackers tested by PESO on their website. Diwali 2012 was the quietest Diwali in recent years. In 2013, the Mumbai Police undertook an awareness and enforcement campaign for the 10pm deadline on bursting crackers during the Diwali Festival. The Firecracker Distributors' Association of Mumbai and Thane also cooperated in this effort. Diwali 2013 was the quietest in a decade.

Awaaz Foundation also has organised volunteers groups, offered them support and education to all those who faced noise related problems, independently monitored Ambient noise level using sound level meter. and interacted with the authorities to ensure their support and co operation. Excessive noise from loudspeakers, construction, traffic and firecrackers have been separately taken up by Foundation at various times and with various authorities; educational programs and publications for schools, colleges, citizens groups and the authorities empowered to implement the laws have been supported and implemented.

Awaaz Foundation encouraged citizen participation to implement noise rules by creating awareness about a free downloadable application onto phones to measure decibel levels. Awaaz requested citizens to complain to the Mumbai Police website with a copy to them for followup and received numerous complaints in the festival season 2012. In 2013, Awaaz Foundation used newly available technology called Noise Watch, a free App to use smartphones or iPhones as decibel meters to build a participatory citizens campaign to map noise levels across Mumbai. A Facebook page Citizens' Noise Map supports the initiative and the readings taken by citizens are upload able directly onto a GIS map. The initiative caught on quickly during Ganpati 2013 and spread to other Indian cities such as Pune almost immediately. The citizens' noise map was sent to the Chief Minister of Maharashtra and spurred a decision of the Government to conduct a formal noise map of Mumbai.

Awaaz Foundation has conducted numerous awareness campaigns including #GetWellSoonMumbai, a social media campaign on Facebook, #TellTheDriver not to honk in partnership with the Thane, Navi Mumbai and Mumbai Traffic Police, #HornFllu in partnership with the Indian Medical Association, Noise Annoys in partnership with the Times of India #YourAwaazAgainstNoise, #GodsAgainstNoise. In 2015, community leaders carried out awareness drives to reduce noise from Mahim Fair and Eid e Milan through public Statements and grass root level campaigns

Awaaz Foundation measured noise at the Shiv Sena Party's annual Dasara Rally in 2010, 2011, 2012 2013, 2014 and 2015 and presented their findings to the Police and Bombay High Court. Based on these readings the police filed cases against Rally organizers.

Following final hearings of Awaaz Foundation's PIL, clubbed with nine other PILs by the Bombay High Court in August 2016, a comprehensive final Order was passed. For the first time, noise levels during the Ganpati festival declined in 2016 Noise levels declined again during Diwali 2016. Mumbai, which in January 2016 was named the noisiest city in India by the Central Pollution Control Board was the only city to see decline in noise levels during the Diwali Festival. The Mumbai Police issued a Statement thanking citizens of Mumbai for making noise pollution reduction a citizens' movement.

== Sand mining ==
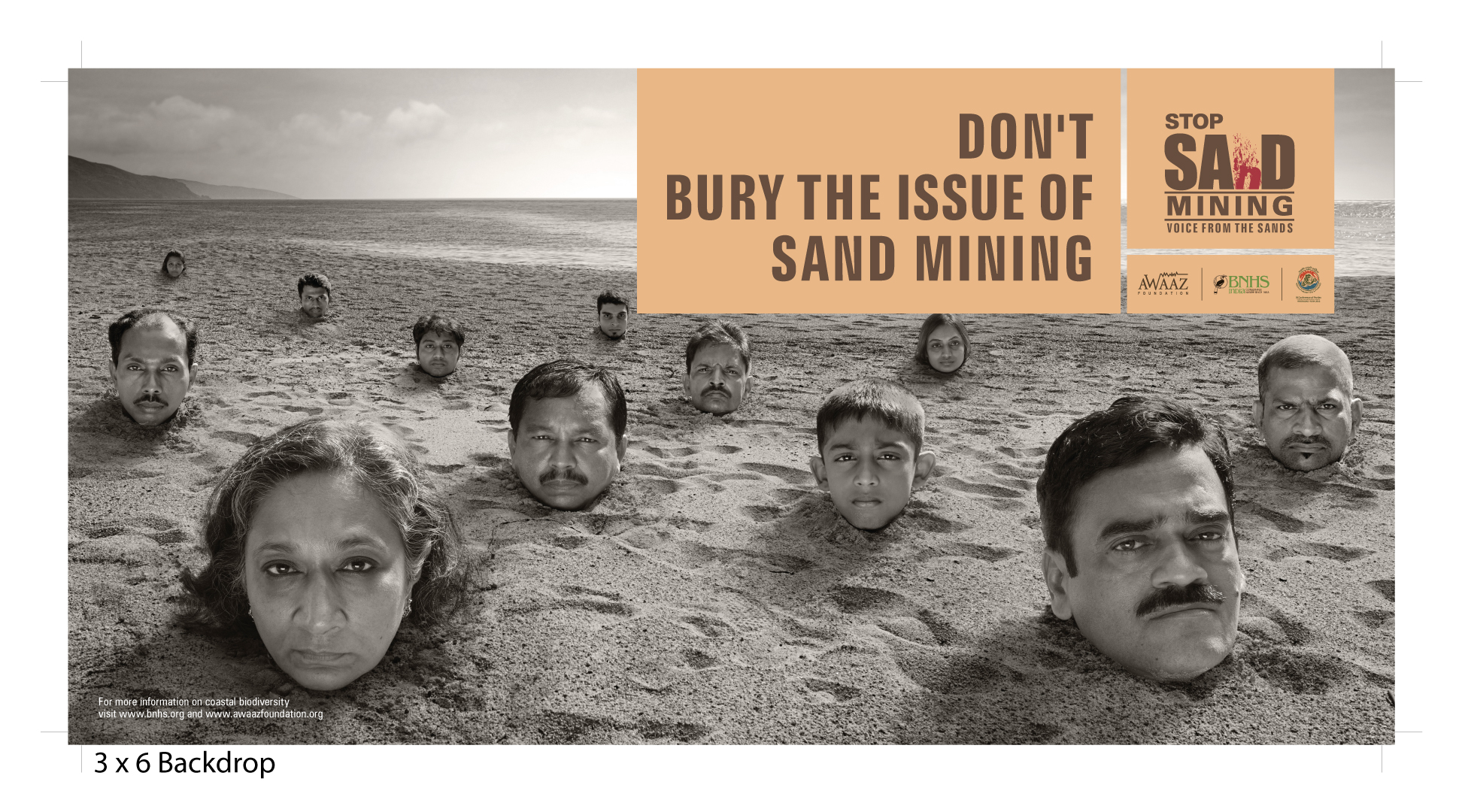
Awaaz Foundation and BNHS created awareness against coastal sand mining for the first time in a national or international forum at the UN Convention on Biodiversity, Conference of Parties 11 in Hyderabad India in October 2012

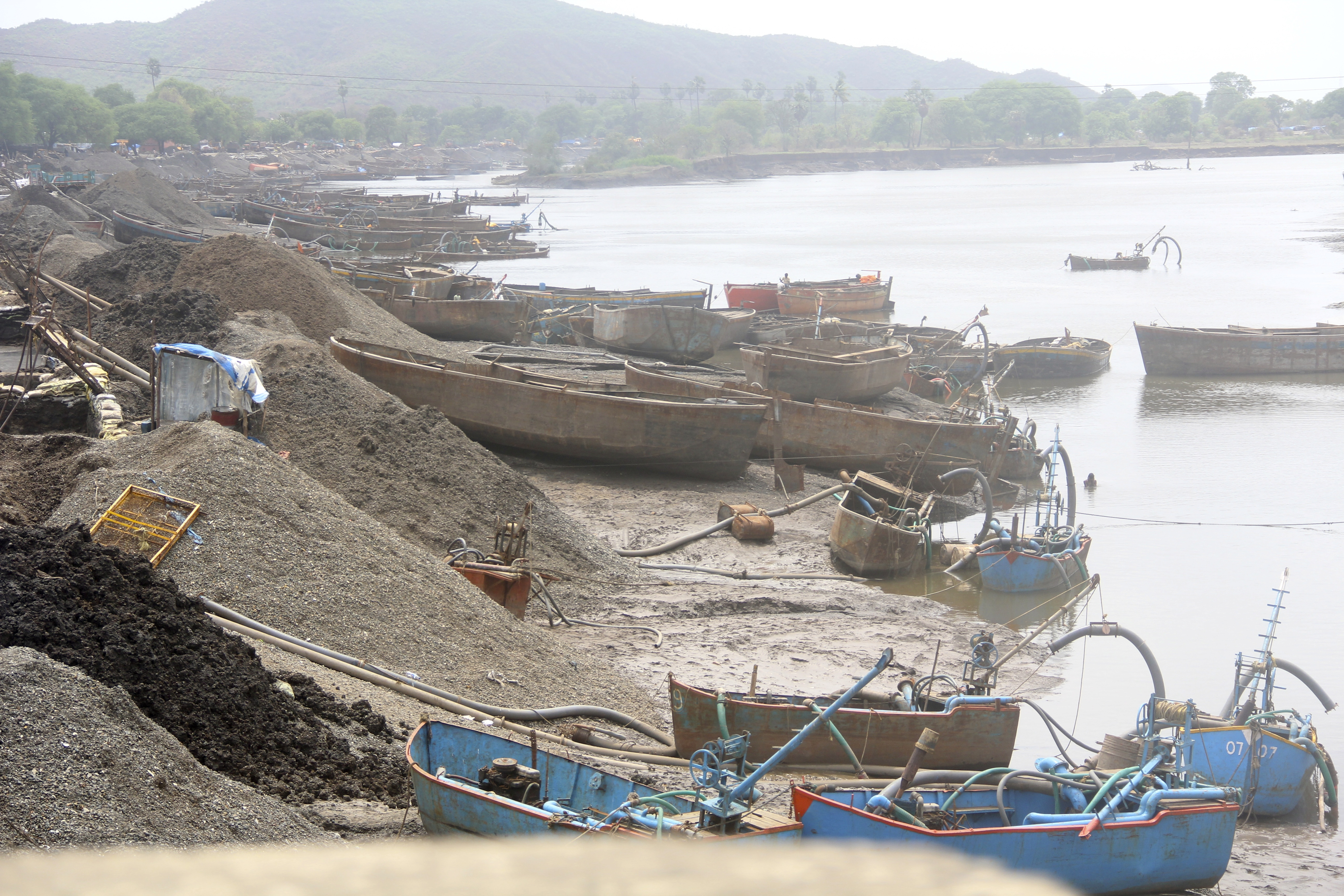
Suction pumps can extract a large volume of sand in a short period of time and can also operate through the day and night and through all seasons to quickly denude an area of its sand.

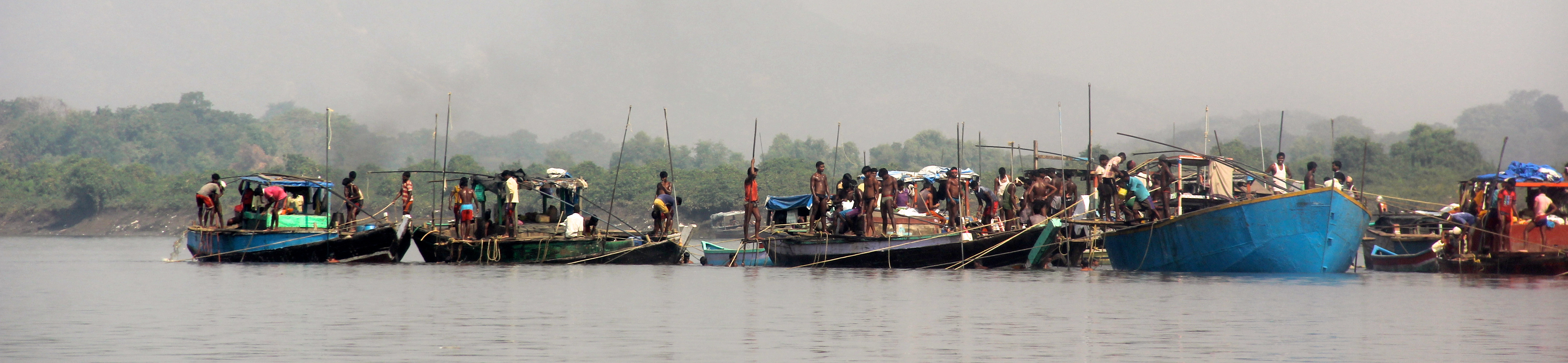
Manual sand mining, although labour-intensive, can extract huge quantities of sand due to the sheer number of such miners at a given stretch. In Thane creek, hundreds of manual sand mining boats operate simultaneously.

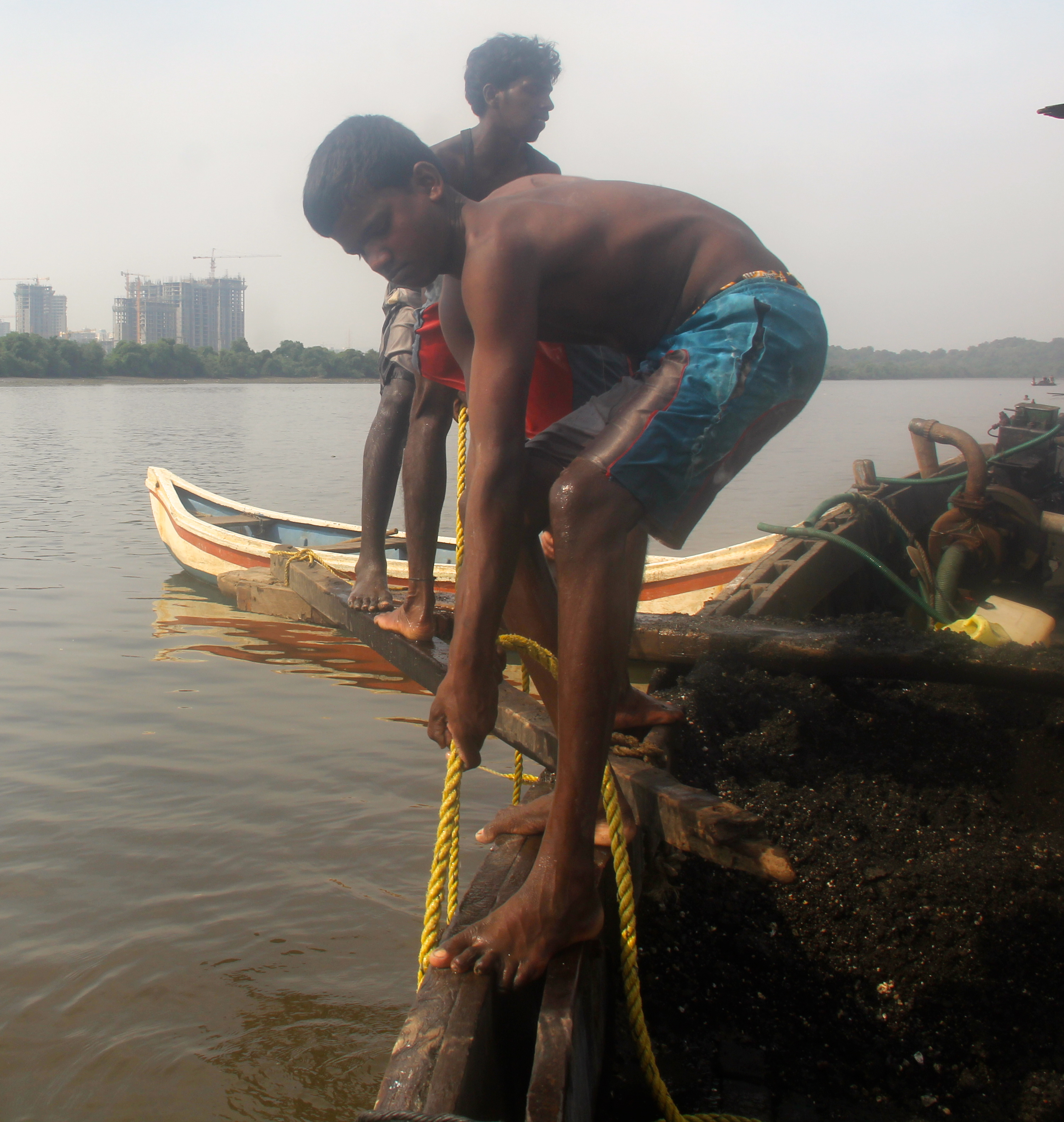
This 13-year-old boy has been mining sand manually for the past 3 years in an illegal sand mining operation near Mumbai.

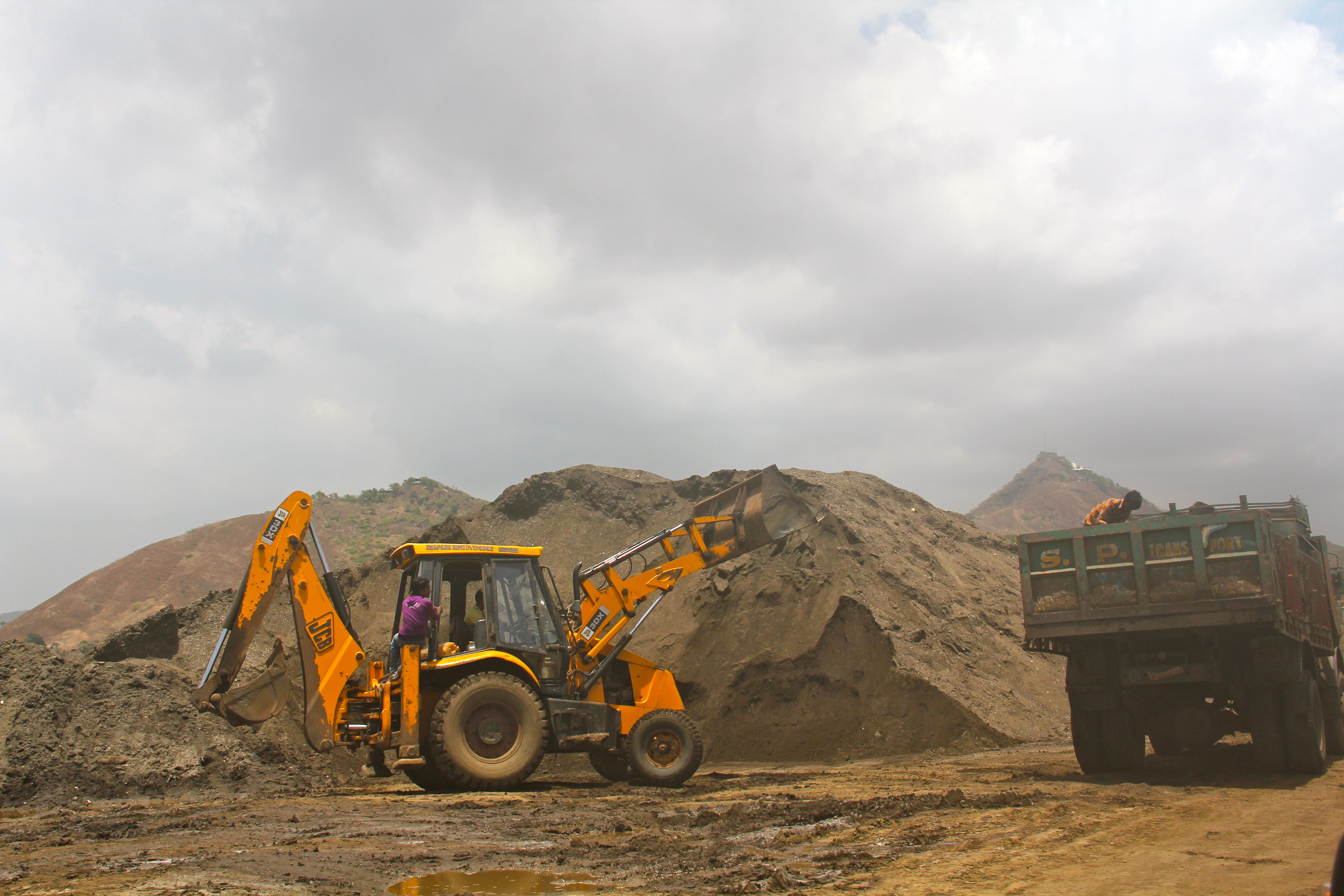
Illegal sand mining is extensive around cities like Mumbai where it is required for construction. There is often a link between politicians and illegal sand mining in India.

Awaaz Foundation has also worked to conserve the coastal ecosystems and aquatic ecosystem habitats, and has engaged in marine conservation activism against nonessential seabed mining. Sand mining is a practice that is becoming an environmental issue in many countries. Awaaz Foundation has raised public awareness of illegal sand mining in Maharashtra and Goa States of India.

Illegal sand mining is a major unacknowledged threat to coastal and riverine biodiversity in India. The suspension of Indian Administrative Service officer Durga Shakti Nagpal for allegedly acting against illegal sand mining in Noida UP has brought the issue, which is rampant all across the country, into sharp focus.

Sand mining is a little known threat to biodiversity, water security and prime coastal or riverside land all over the world and is capable of causing land erosion, contaminating sweet water along coastlines and rivers, and destroying entire habitats in a very short space of time. While there are numerous scientific studies on habitat degradation for various other reasons, and specific studies on loss of various species of flora and fauna, there is no official information available on the effect on entire ecosystems due to large scale illegal sand mining, particularly coastal sand mining. The issue was brought to attention at any national or international forum for the first time through a side event The effect of coastal sand mining on biodiversity at the Convention on Biological Diversity Conference of Parties 11 by Awaaz Foundation and Bombay Natural History Society(BNHS) in October 2012. In August 2013, the National Green Tribunal banned sand mining in rivers across India. However, illegal sand mining on the coast around Mumbai continued even after the Order.

The term sand mafia has been referred to by the Indian media while referring to those supporting or engaged in illegal sand mining (mainly politicians) who threaten, attack and kill Government and Police officers, activists or any other person who attempts to stop the illegal activity. MITRA (Movement against Intimidation, Threat and Revenge against Activists), a network of NGOs to protect activists in Maharashtra was set up after an attack by the sand mafia on Awaaz Foundation Convenor Sumaira Abdulali in 2004. This was the first publicly reported attack by the sand mafia but over the years there have been numerous others including a second attack on Sumaira Abdulali and a team of journalists, the murder of a Police Officer in Madhya Pradesh, murder of activists in Tamil Nadu and UP, and the suspension of IAS Durga Shakti Nagpal. Awaaz Foundation wrote to the Prime Minister of India protesting Durga Nagpal's transfer and demanded an investigation into the links between the transfer, the murder of activist Pale Ram Chauhan in the same area a few days later, and the politically led sand mafia of the region. An investigation was conducted by the MoEF and the presence of the sand mafia was confirmed. Report of MoEF on sand mining

The State Government of Maharashtra first took serious note of illegal coastal sand mining in 2004 following an incident of assault at Kihim Beach on Sumaira Abdulali (Convenor of Awaaz Foundation) by the son and employees of a local Member of the Legislative Assembly who are part of an extensive politically controlled sand mafia in Maharashtra. After that, Awaaz Foundation filed a public interest litigation (PIL) in the Bombay High Court seeking a ban on mining activities along the Konkan coast. Following the PIL, the court banned mining in the CRZ (coastal regulation zone) area and directed that a comprehensive report on alternatives to sand dredging prepared by Indian Institute of Technology Bombay should be implemented by the State Government. The Report includes measures to compulsorily manufacture and use artificial sand from building debris, environmental cess on natural sand and more environmentally friendly techniques of sand dredging.

Sumaira Abdulali was attacked a second time in March 2010 at Mahad while inspecting a site where illegal sand dredging is rampant. Thereafter, the Bombay High Court has completely banned all sand mining activity in the State of Maharashtra and the Government has been forced to notify a completely new Policy on sand mining after considering the IIT Bombay Report.

Sumaira Abdulali of Awaaz foundation raised some specific queries under the Right to Information Act regarding number of licences issued to barges carrying sand from Raigad district to Mumbai and Navi Mumbai along with the name of barges owners, conditions for operations as well as the number of inspections deployed to check if any contraband material was being smuggled into the jetty. The MMB did not respond for several months, then foundation filed these queries with the Maharashtra State Information Commission. Thereafter, the concerned agencies responded that neither The Maharashtra Maritime Board (MMB) nor Directorate-General of Shipping (DGS) nor The Indian Coast Guard maintain any records of the number of barges that move in and out of the inland waters on a day -to -day basis.

The new sand mining policy stipulates that the barges should be registered and the list should be updated with the local Tehsildar. The Maharashtra Maritime Board (MMB) will Provide No Objection Certificates to the sand barges that pass through the sea channel after the letters of approval from the district collector.

Awaaz Foundation inspected numerous illegal sand mining sites in the coastal areas near Mumbai including Thane, Vaitarna, Bankot Creeks, Kihim and Awas beaches and sent their findings to the MoEF, Government of Maharashtra, police and local authorities. They were instrumental in bringing public awareness about illegal sand mining and political links to this activity. Awaaz Foundation published a Report ' The links between politicians and sand mining in and around Mumbai. To control illegal sand mining controlled by politicians, Awaaz Foundation has proposed a specially trained environmental police in India.

To advocate policy change and raise awareness internationally, Awaaz Foundation participated and raised awareness for the first time in any national or International Convention through a side event in the Conference of Parties 11 held under the United Nations Convention on Biological Diversity in Hyderabad India in October 2012. Awaaz Foundation participated in the making of a documentary film on international coastal sand mining, Sand Wars, directed by Denis Delestrac. Sand Wars had record viewership when shown on the French channel Arte. Awaaz Foundation is advocating inclusion of coastal sand mining on the Agenda of the next Convention of Biodiversity Conference of Parties 12 in 2014 by writing to the Indian Government, who is its International custodian until October 2014.

In 2016, Awaaz Foundation once again represented to the United Nations that the ill effects of sand mining should form part of the global agenda of the United Nations Environment Programme during a meeting with Mr Erik Solheim, chief of UNEP. They also pressed for mainstreaming of alternative methods of building and road construction using recycled debris and plastics, which have been successful in pilot and small projects.

In August 2016 a number of people lost their lives when a bridge was swept away at Mahad. The bridge was located near a sand mining site where Sumaira Abdulali had been attacked in 2010 during a sand mining site inspection. Sand mining equipment was found abandoned in the creek. Awaaz Foundation demanded an enquiry into the link between the collapse and nearby illegal sand mining, but Home Minister to the Government of Maharashtra Deepak Kesarkar, without carrying out any enquiry, stated that there was no link.

== Mining in dense forests ==
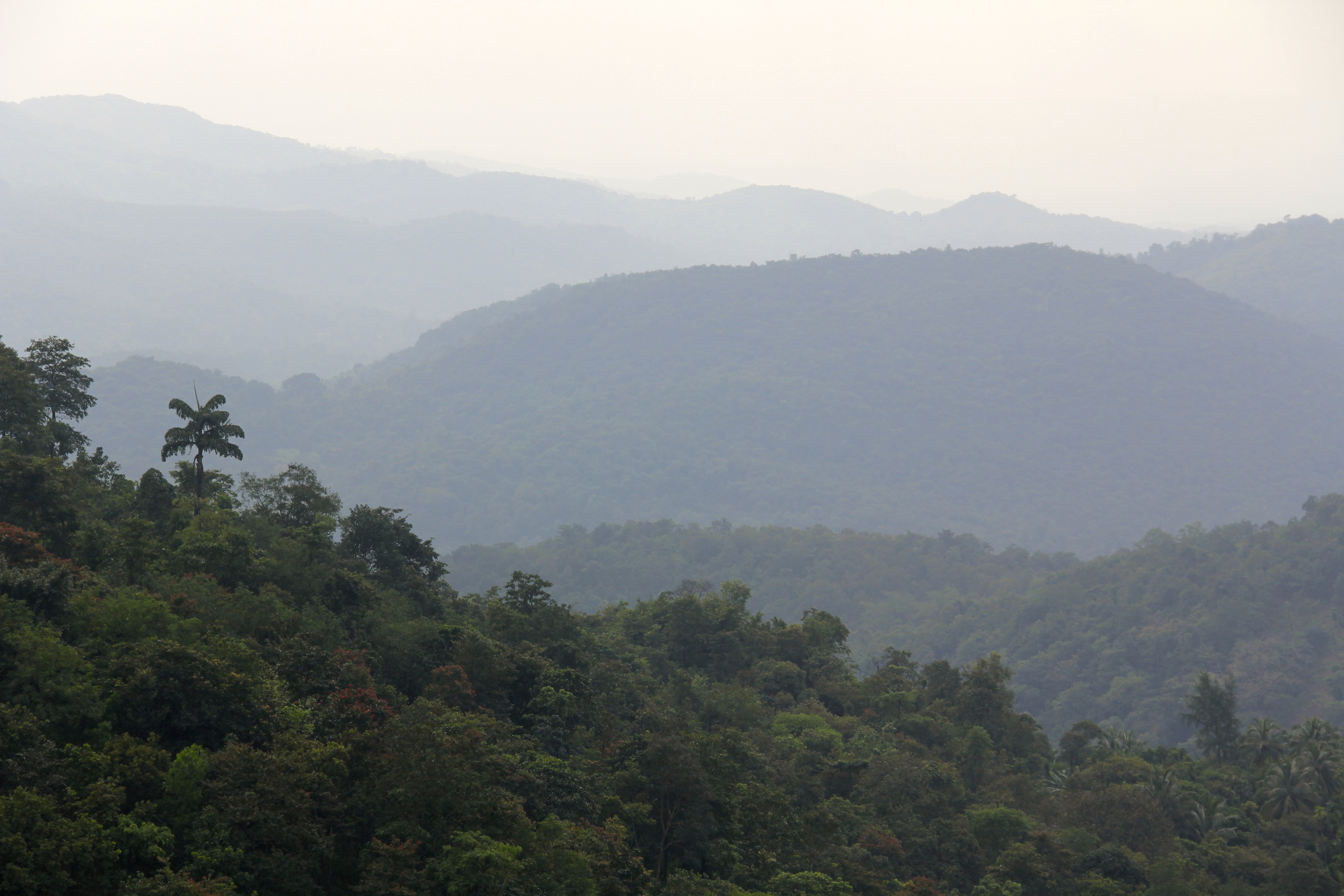
Sawantwadi-Dodamarg is one of the most thickly forested areas in Maharashtra (49%) and is extremely biodiverse including tiger, elephant and a variety of indigenous flora and fauna.

In 2006, India applied to the UNESCO MAB for the Western Ghats to be listed as a protected World Heritage Site. The Western Ghats is very important Tropical Rainforest of India. During the monsoon season between June and September, the unbroken Western Ghats chain acts as a barrier to the moisture laden clouds. The range starts near the border of Gujarat and Maharashtra, south of the River Tapti, and runs approximately 1,600 kilometres (990 mi) through the states of Maharashtra, Goa, Karnataka, Tamil Nadu and Kerala ending at Kanyakumari, at the southern tip of India, one of three Biodiversity hotspots in the country.

The National Mineral Policy of India, 2008 rules that any abandoned mine "should be made richer than what it was before" through refilling the craters and reforestation, but most miners leave their mines in a state of utter decay and toxicity. According to the data available with the ministry's Indian Bureau of Mines, there are 297 abandoned mines across the country and most of them are yet to be "rehabilitated". To protect large-scale destruction of flora and fauna around Western Ghats. Awaaz Foundation is advocating a zero-mining policy.

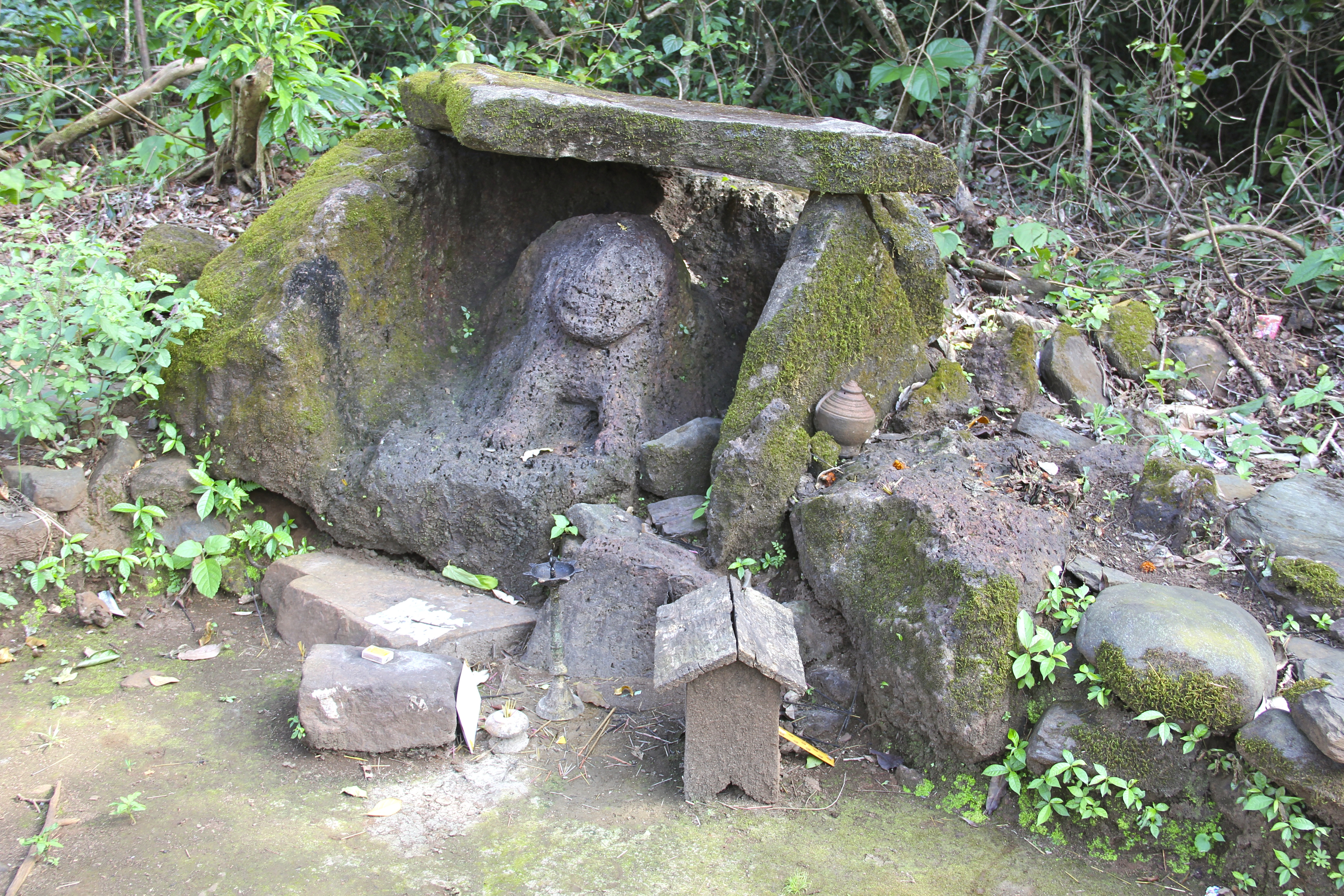
After 49 mining licenses were sanctioned by the Government of Maharashtra, 22 villages of the Sawantwadi-Dodamarg wildlife corridor made official representations to have their area notified as eco sensitive. Tiger is often spotted here and this is the Tiger God they worship.

Awaaz Foundation successfully filed public interest litigation to declare the Sawantwadi–Dodamarg wildlife corridor as an eco sensitive area. The State Government of Maharashtra had sanctioned 49 mines in the area, even though its own record shows that the corridor, connecting national parks such as Radhanagari Wildlife Sanctuary in Maharashtra with those in Goa and Karnataka, abounds in indigenous flora and fauna including tiger and elephant and has the highest green cover in Maharashtra (49%). Sawantwadi-Dodamarg, due to its many natural springs and high rainfall, is also a source area for rivers which feed water to Goa. 22 villages signed resolutions not to allow mines in their area.

The ministry of environment and forests of Government of India appointed two high levels Committees to recommend the type of development which should take place in the Western Ghats. Initially, the MoEF appointed the Western Ghat Ecology Expert Panel headed by ecologist Dr. Madhav Gadgil but suppressed its Report which recommended that the entire Western Ghats were eco sensitive to varying degrees. Awaaz Foundation and other concerned citizens filed Right to Information applications which resulted in the Report being made public over 6 months after it was finalised. Amid growing demand for implementation of the Western Ghat Ecology Expert Panel, the Government appointed another Committee chaired by Dr. Krishnaswamy Kasturirangan to assess the recommendations of the Western Ghat Ecology Expert Panel Report. Dr. Kasturirangan Report too, was neither accepted nor declined for several months.

Meanwhile, Awaaz Foundation's litigation for declaration of the Sawantwadi-Dodamarg wildlife corridor as eco sensitive was heard by the Bombay High Court on 28 September 2013 and the Government ordered to notify it as eco sensitive before 31 December 2013. The Order was passed during the pendency of both high level Committee Reports and forms a precedent for citizens/villagers to take up smaller bio diverse areas for protection.

== Heavy metal pollution ==
Awaaz Foundation measured heavy metal content of firecrackers and Holi colours and found high levels of toxic heavy metals in both. Tests conducted by Volunteer Faiz Abdulali using a sensitive meter capable of detecting specific heavy metals instantly through surface contact was used. In 2013, metals which are banned under the Manufacture, Storage and Import of Hazardous Chemicals Rules 1989 and placed under Schedule 1 for their highly toxic nature through ingestion or through contact were detected such as Vanadium, Copper, Zirconium, Lead and other heavy metals. These were found specially in commonly used crackers such as sparklers which are often handled by children. Awaaz Foundation has demanded a full disclosure of all chemical content of firecrackers on their packaging. This would be in accordance with Supreme Court Orders.

== See also ==
- noise regulation scale
- Sound level meter
- Environmental Principles and Policies
- Environmental design and planning
- Noise health effects
- Loud music
- Noise-induced hearing loss
- Loudness
- Environmental Policy
- Environmentalism
- Human ecology
- Environmental movement
- Forest protection
- List of environmental issues
- Environmental design
- Environmental agreements
