= Movement against Intimidation, Threat and Revenge against Activists =

Movement against Intimidation, Threat and Revenge against Activists (MITRA)
- Formation: 2004
- Type: Non-governmental organisation
- Headquarters: Mumbai
- Region served: India
- President: B.G. Deshmukh
- Website: www.mitraindia.net

Movement against Intimidation, Threat and Revenge against Activists (MITRA) is a network of NGOs and activists based in Mumbai to protect people taking up public interest causes through Right to Information, grass root activism, or public-interest litigation (India) against intimidation from threat and attack from vested interests they may oppose in the course of their work. MITRA was founded in 2004 after an attack on activist Sumaira Abdulali by the politically led sand mafia at Kihim Beach, Alibag. MITRA was chaired by late Mr. B.G Deshmukh IAS, Retired Cabinet Secretary of India.

== Attacks on activists ==
After activist and Convenor of Awaaz Foundation Sumaira Abdulali was attacked by the son and employees of a local Alibag politician during a sand mining site visit, a public meeting was held in Mumbai and MITRA was formed under the Chairmanship of Mr. B.G. Deshmukh, IAS and retired Cabinet Secretary of India. A number of prominent NGOs and activists networked for the first time to provide a common platform to fight against vested interests and show solidarity in the face of violence. Activists under threat or those who were attacked were identified and joint NGO representations made at various levels including to the Government of Maharashtra the Police and the Bombay High Court. Recently, Attacks on RTI activists in India are escalating along with attacks on other public spirited citizens taking up grass root activism or public interest litigation.

== Representations to authorities ==
MITRA made a number of representations to the Commissioner of Police, the Home Minister of Maharashtra, Chief Minister of Maharashtra, the Home Minister of India, Prime Minister of India and Chairperson of the UPA Smt Sonia Gandhi. Attacks and murders of known activists, journalists and government and police officers acting in the public interest were brought to their attention and included a second attack on Sumaira Abdulali and journalist Viju B at Mahad, an attack on Citispace Convenor Nayana Kathpalia in Mumbai, an attack on AGNI Co ordinator Jamesh John in Mumbai, an attack on Citispace Trustee H S D’Lima in Mumbai, the murder of activist Shehla Masood in Bhopal, the murder of Right to Information activist Satish Shetty in Pune, the murder of journalist J Dey in Mumbai, the murder of anti-superstition activist Narendra Dabholkar in Pune.

== Suo Motu public interest litigation ==
In 2010, following an attack on Citispace Convenor Nayana Kathpalia who had filed public interest litigation in the Bombay High Court and the murder of RTI Activist Satish Shetty in Pune for exposing an active land mafia, the Bombay High Court took up suo motu public interest litigation to protect citizens working in the public interest. MITRA intervened in the petition and obtained an order for the legal status of ongoing cases of attack or murder of activists pending with the police to be placed before the Court. In most cases, no arrests had been made. The Court also ordered the police to compile a list of activists or citizens under threat and to take action to protect them.

== See also ==
- Attacks on RTI activists in India
