= Banking Nature =

- Written by: Denis Delestrac; Sandrine Feydel
- Directed by: Denis Delestrac; Sandrine Feydel
- Music by: Stéphane Lopez
- Country of origin: France
- Original languages: English; French

Production
- Producer: Via Découvertes
- Editor: Guillaume Quignard
- Running time: 88 minutes
- Production company: ARTE France

Original release
- Release: 3 February 2015

Banking Nature is a documentary by Denis Delestrac and Sandrine Feydel that looks at the growing movement to monetize the natural world and to turn endangered species and threatened areas into instruments of profit.

== Synopsis ==
Sandrine Feydel and Denis Delestrac report on how investors buy up the habitats of endangered species and then sell them in the form of shares. The film includes a montage of images of nature, reflective voice-overs and interviews with bankers, economists, activists and policymakers. The economist Pavan Sukhdev is interviewed, saying nature can best be protected by sticking a price tag on it. Pablo Solon is interviewed saying this subjecting of nature to free market forces as a "license to kill" it. Vandana Shiva, an Indian philosopher, scientist and environmentalist is also interviewed.
