= Maharashtra Pollution Control Board =

Regulatory body in Indian state

- महाराष्ट्र प्रदूषण नियंत्रण मंडळ
- Official logo of MPCB

Agency overview
- Formed: 7 September 1970
- Jurisdiction: Government of Maharashtra
- Headquarters: Sion, Mumbai-400051
- Agency executives: Shri. Siddhesh Ramdas Kadam, Chairman; Shri. M. Devender Singh (IAS:2011 DR), Member Secretary
- Website: http://mpcb.gov.in/

The Maharashtra Pollution Control Board (Marathi: महाराष्ट्र प्रदूषण नियंत्रण मंडळ) (established 7 September 1970) implements a range of environmental legislation in the state of Maharashtra, India. The MPCB functions under the administrative control of Environment Department of the Government of Maharashtra.

== Responsibilities and Functions of Maharashtra Pollution Control Board ==
It is mainly responsible for:

- Water (Prevention and Control of Pollution) Act, 1974,
- Air (Prevention and Control of Pollution) Act, 1981,
- Water (Cess) Act, 1977
- Some of the provisions under Environmental (Protection) Act, 1986 and the rules framed under this like:
  - Biomedical Waste (M&H) Rules, 2016,
  - Hazardous Waste (M&H) Rules, 2016,
  - Municipal Solid Waste Rules, 2016 etc.

It was established under the provisions of Maharashtra Prevention of Water Pollution Act, 1969.

Some of the important functions of MPCB are;

- To plan comprehensive program for the prevention, control or abatement of pollution and secure executions thereof,
- To collect and disseminate information relating to pollution and the prevention, control or abatement thereof,
- To inspect sewage or trade effluent treatment and disposal facilities, and air pollution control systems and to review plans, specification or any other data relating to the treatment plants, disposal systems and air pollution control systems in connection with the consent granted,
- Supporting and encouraging the developments in the fields of pollution control, waste recycle reuse, eco-friendly practices etc.
- To educate and guide the entrepreneurs in improving environment by suggesting appropriate pollution control technologies and techniques
- Creation of public awareness about the clean and healthy environment and attending the public complaints regarding pollution.

== Criticism ==
During a hearing of a PIL on the Panchganga river pollution, the court find that successive state governments had not appointed members for the board since its establishment on 7 September 1970. The appointment of board members is obligatory as stipulated in the Water (Prevention and Control of Pollution) Act, 1974. There is no data available whether the government has ever appointed members other than the secretary-level officers.

The National Human Rights Commission of India issued a notice on 1 September 2026 to the Maharashtra Pollution Control Board, seeking an inquiry and action-taken report on the allegations of noise pollution during the public Ganeshotsav celebrations.

== See also ==
- Awaaz Foundation is a Non-governmental organisation in India, works towards preserving and enhancing environment and for other socially oriented causes.
- MPCB-CASI MAHA Model United Nations is a student led simulation of the United Nations held in Maharashtra, where all Universities across Maharashtra participate in. Organised by Maharashtra Pollution Control Board, Environment Department and Public Works Department | Government of Maharashtra.
