= Denis Delestrac =

French director and producer

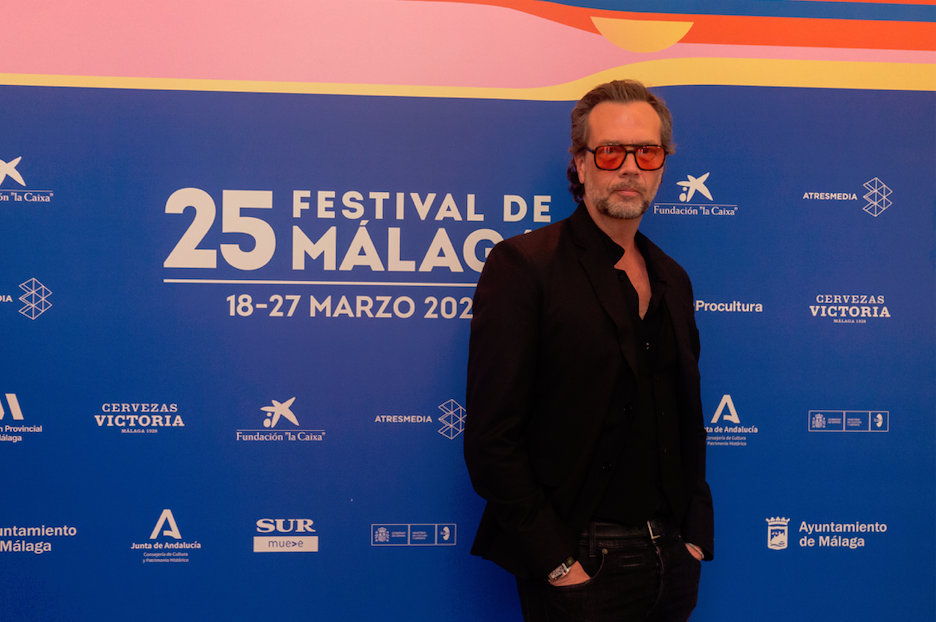
- Denis Delestrac at the Malaga Film Festival
- Born: Denis Delestrac; 14 August 1968 (age 57); France
- Occupation: Film director
- Website: http://www.denisdelestrac.com

Denis Delestrac is a French director and producer who is best known for creating feature-length investigative documentaries. His films focus on the ecological, social, and political impacts of natural resources. His film, Sand Wars, influenced the United Nations Environmental Program to write a report on sand scarcity in 2019.

He has won over 40 international prizes and became a member of the European Film Academy in 2017.

== Career ==
Denis Delestrac graduated from the Toulouse Law School and obtained a Master's degree in Journalism at the University of Dallas. He began working as a photojournalist, and later as a writer in the United States, where he covered the 1992 Los Angeles riots, the Waco siege, and the 1992 presidential elections.

Denis Delestrac made his debut in non-fiction filmmaking in 2001. In addition to his TV and theatrical non-fiction works, Delestrac directs branded content films for brands or events through his production company Intrepido Films.[1]

== Private life ==
Delestrac resides in Barcelona.

== Selected filmography ==
Film	Year	Position	Description
McCurry: The Pursuit of Color	2021	Director, writer, producer	Documentary biopic about the photographer Steve McCurry
The Shadow of Gold	2018	Director, co-writer	Two-part documentary investigating the social and environmental impact of gold mining.
Captain's Dream	2018	Director, writer, producer	The Russian artist and boat captain, Alexander Ponomarev creates the first Biennale in Antarctica.
Freightened	2016	Director, writer	An investigation which reveals the mechanics and perils of freight shipment industry.
Banking Nature	2014	Director, co-writer	A documentary that looks at the growing movement to monetize the natural world and turning endangered species into instruments of profit.
Sand Wars	2013	Director, writer, associate producer	Sand Wars is a docu-thriller about the scarcity of sand due to mining the resource for making concrete.
Pax Americana	2010	Director, writer, associate producer	Pax Americana examines the origins and today's reality of the militarization of space.
Mystery of the Nile	2005	Assistant director	IMAX film documenting the first successful expedition to navigate the entire length of the Nile from source to sea.
Adventure of the Nile	2005	Director, writer	A documentary film about the first expedition to have succeeded in descending the Nile.
The Nomad Experience	2006	Director	A documentary reflection about spirituality and human values.
Human Rights	2003	Scriptwriter	A documentary film about how armed conflicts affect civilian communities and force displacement.
The Face of the Human Condition	2003	Scriptwriter	A portrait of National Geographic photographer Steve McCurry.
Recovering the Past	2003	Scriptwriter	A documentary film about heritage conservation in Sudan with contemporary archaeologist Charles Bonnet.
The Nomad Spirit	2003	Scriptwriter	A look at how market economy has transformed the Mongolian society.
The Mission to Educate	2003	Scriptwriter	The educative, healthcare and economic challenges faced by the Tuareg and Wodaabe tribes of the Ténéré Desert.

== Selected awards ==
- Best film – Inspiration Category – EKO Film 2013
- Gold Panda for Best Nature & Environment Protection Award – Sishuan TV Festival 2013
- Golden Sun – Barcelona Environmental Film Festival 2013
- Japan Prize NHK 2013 – 2nd Prize
- Greenpeace Prize – Festival du Film Vert 2014
- Best film – San Francisco International Ocean Film Festival 2014
- Finalist – Monte Carlo 33rd International URTI Grand Prix for Author's Documentary
- Rockie Award – Banff World Media Festival 2014
- Prix Gémeaux 2014
- Winner – Wild and Scenic Film Festival 2015
- Best Film – Green Me Film Festival 2015
- Winner - "Impact Prize" – FIGRA 2015
- Best Environmental Film – Cayman International Film Festival 2015
- Winner - Expo Milano Prize 2015
- Best Full Length Documentary – 8th Kuala Lumpur Eco Film Fest 2015
- Award of the Faculty of Forestry and Wood Sciences – Life Sciences Film Festival Prague
- Grand Prize of the City of Innsbruck 2015
- Best International Feature Award – Planet in Focus – Toronto 2015
- Golden Sun – FICMA 2015
- Special Prize – "Emys Foundation" 2015
- Greenpeace Prize – Festival du Film vert de Genève 2016
- Best Film – Another Way Film Festival 2016
- Grands Prix – Ecrans Publics 2016
- Winner – Deauville Green Awards 2016
- Finalist – DIG Awards 2016
- Winner – Deauville Green Awards 2018
- Winner – 3rd place On Art Film Festival 2018

== Professional affiliations ==
- Member of the European Film Academy
- Member of the International Federation of Journalists
- Founding member of The Barcelona International Documentary Club
- Membre Sociétaire Stagiaire du collège audiovisuel de la Société Civile des Auteurs Multimédia
