= Sand mining =

Practice used to extract sand

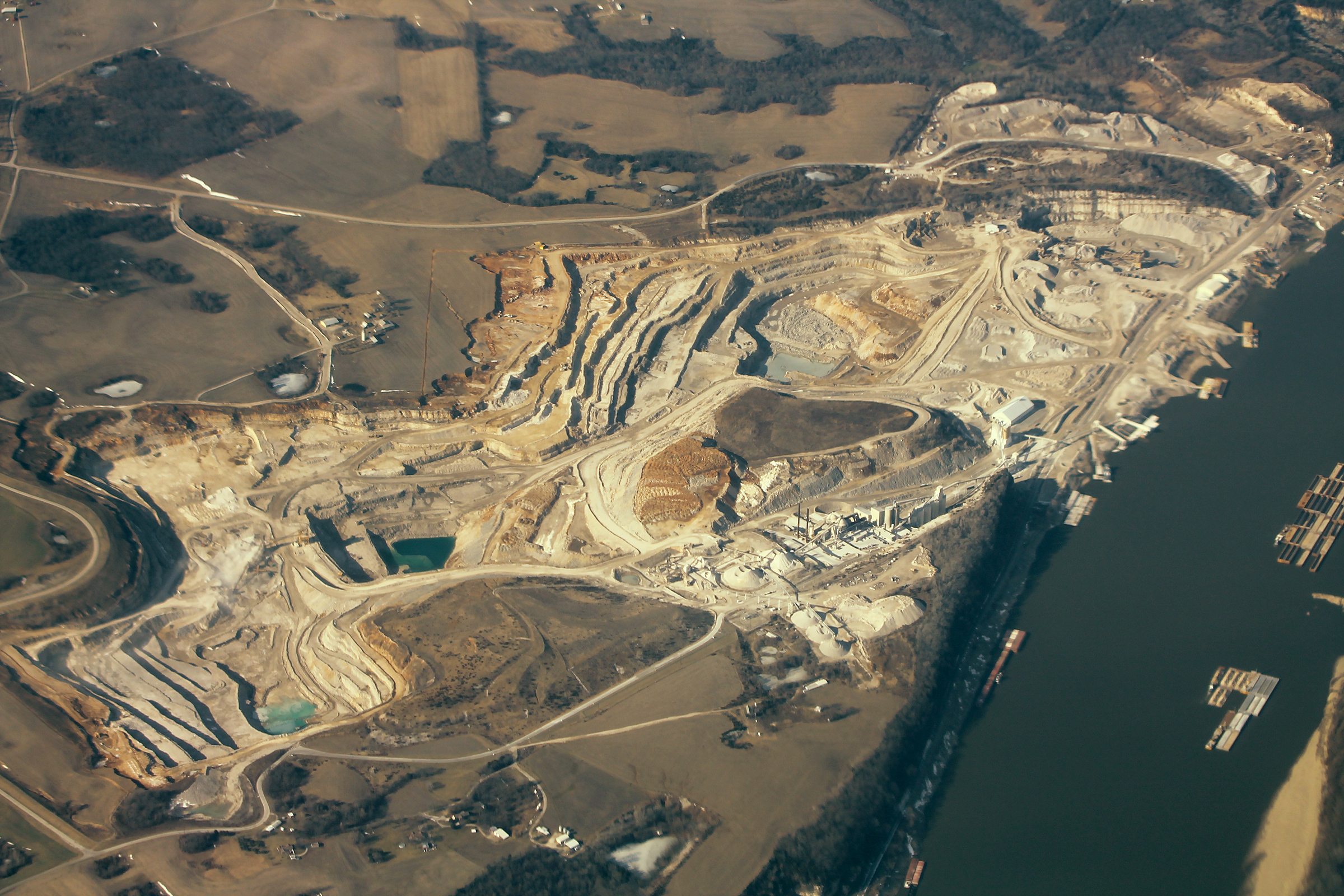
Sand pit along the Mississippi River, United States

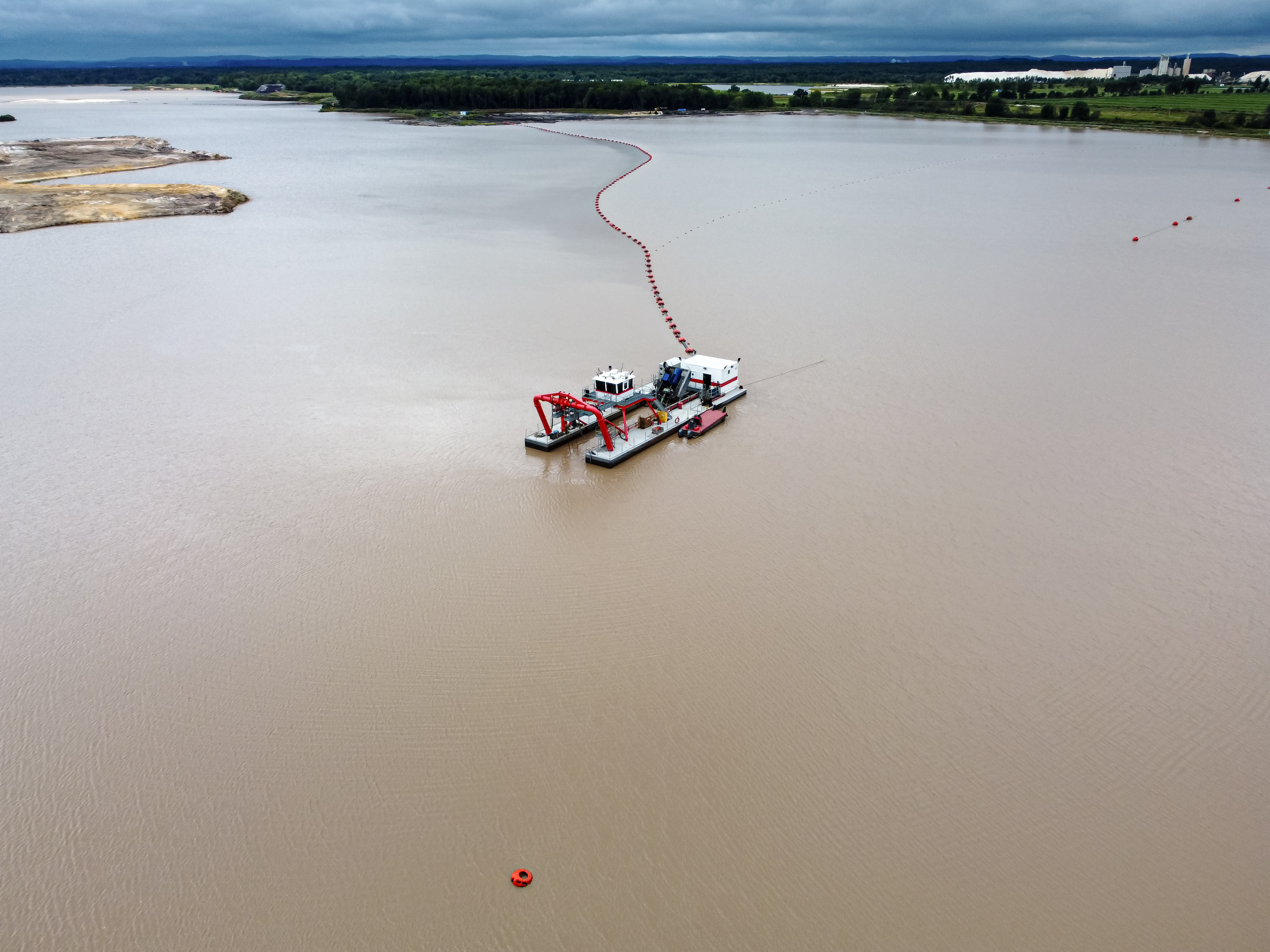
Artificial lake with frac sand dredger

Sand mining is the extraction of sand, mainly through an open pit (or sand pit) but sometimes mined from beaches and inland dunes or dredged from ocean and river beds. Sand is often used in manufacturing, for example as an abrasive or in concrete. It is also used on icy and snowy roads usually mixed with salt, to lower the melting point temperature, on the road surface. Sand can replace eroded coastline. Some uses require higher purity than others; for example sand used in concrete must be free of seashell fragments.

Sand mining presents opportunities to extract rutile, ilmenite, and zircon, which contain the industrially useful elements titanium and zirconium. Besides these minerals, beach sand may also contain garnet, leucoxene, sillimanite, and monazite.

These minerals are quite often found in ordinary sand deposits. A process known as elutriation is used, whereby flowing water separates the grains based on their size, shape, and density.

Sand mining is a direct cause of erosion, and impacts the local wildlife. Various animals depend on sandy beaches for nesting clutches, and mining has led to the near extinction of gharials (a species of crocodilian) in India. Disturbance of underwater and coastal sand causes turbidity in the water, which is harmful for organisms like coral that need sunlight. It can also destroy fisheries, financially harming their operators.

Removal of physical coastal barriers, such as dunes, sometimes leads to flooding of beachside communities, and the destruction of picturesque beaches causes tourism to dissipate. Sand mining is regulated by law in many places, but is often done illegally. Globally, it is a $70 billion industry, with sand selling at up to $90 per cubic yard.

== By country ==
=== Australia ===
In the 1940 mining operations began on the Kurnell Peninsula (Captain Cook's landing place in Australia) to supply the expanding Sydney building market. It continued until 1990 with an estimate of over 70 million tonnes of sand having been removed. The sand has been valued for many decades by the building industry, mainly because of its high crushed shell content and lack of organic matter, it has provided a cheap source of sand for most of Sydney since sand mining operations began. The site has now been reduced to a few remnant dunes and deep water-filled pits which are now being filled with demolition waste from Sydney's building sites. Removal of the sand has significantly weakened the peninsula's capacity to resist storms. Ocean waves pounding against the reduced Kurnell dune system have threatened to break through to Botany Bay, especially during the storms of May and June back in 1974 and of August 1998. Sand Mining also takes place in the Stockton sand dunes north of Newcastle and in the Broken Hill region in the far west of the state.

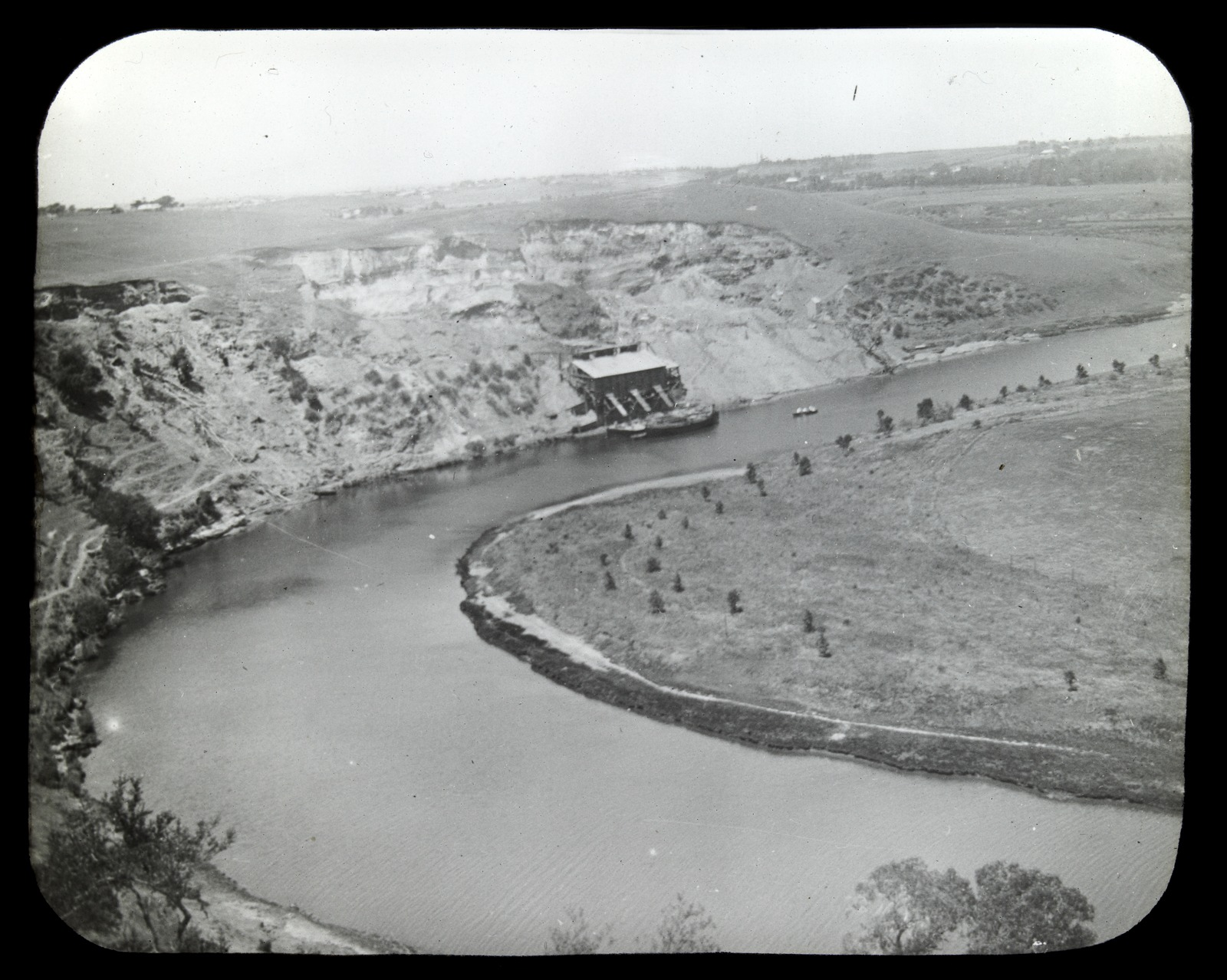
Sand being loaded onto a barge on the Maribyrnong River, Essendon West, around 1910

A large and long-running sand mine in Queensland, Australia (on North Stradbroke Island) provides a case study in the environmental consequences on a fragile sandy-soil based ecosystem, justified by the provision of low wage casual labor on an island with few other work options. The Labor state government pledged to end sand mining by 2025, but this decision was overturned by the LNP government which succeeded it. This decision has been subject to an allegation of corrupt conduct.

From the 1850s to the early 20th century, sand was mined from the tall, cliff-like banks of the Maribyrnong River, in what is now suburban Melbourne. The Maribyrnong Sand Company was set up in the early 20th century to transport the sand by barge downriver to the industrial areas of Footscray and Yarraville, for use in the production of glass, concrete and ceramics.

Sand mining contributes to the construction of buildings and development. The negative effects of sand mining include the permanent loss of sand in areas, as well as major habitat destruction.

=== India ===
Sand mining is an environmental problem in India. Environmentalists have raised public awareness of illegal sand mining in the states of Maharashtra, Madhya Pradesh, Andhra Pradesh, Tamil Nadu and Goa. Conservation and environmental NGO Awaaz Foundation filed a public interest litigation in the Bombay High Court seeking a ban on mining activities along the Konkan coast. Awaaz Foundation, in partnership with the Bombay Natural History Society also presented the issue of sand mining as a major international threat to coastal biodiversity at the Conference of Parties 11, Convention on Biological Diversity, Hyderabad in October 2012. D. K. Ravi, an Indian Administrative Service officer of the Karnataka state, who was well known for his tough crackdown on the rampant illegal sand mining in the Kolar district, was found dead at his residence in Bengaluru, on 16 March 2015. It is widely alleged that the death was not due to suicide but caused by the mafia involved in land grabbing and sand mining.

=== New Zealand ===
Sand mining occurs in the Kaipara Harbour, off the coast at Pakiri and offshore from Little Barrier Island. A sand mine had operated at Whiritoa on the east coast of the North Island for 50 years extracting 180,000m^{3} of sand. Coastal sand mines currently operate at Maioro and Taharoa to recover iron sand. When an application was lodged in 2005 to mine iron sands on the seabed of the coast of Raglan local residents organised in opposition to the scheme. The application for the mining was turned down by Crown Minerals due to a lack of technical detail. A proposal to begin sand mining in Bream Bay was among 149 initiatives invited to apply for resource consent in a streamlined process under the Fast-track Approvals Act 2024, an inclusion which drew widespread opposition amongst the local community.

=== Sierra Leone ===
Activists and local villagers have protested against sand mining on Sierra Leone's Western Area Peninsula. The activity is contributing to Sierra Leone's coastal erosion, which is proceeding at up to 6 meters a year.

=== United States ===
The current size of the sand mining market in the United States is slightly over a billion dollars per year. The industry has been growing by nearly 10% annually since 2005 because of its use in hydrocarbon extraction. The majority of the market size for mining is held by Texas and Illinois.

==== Wisconsin, Minnesota, Illinois, Indiana, Iowa and Florida ====
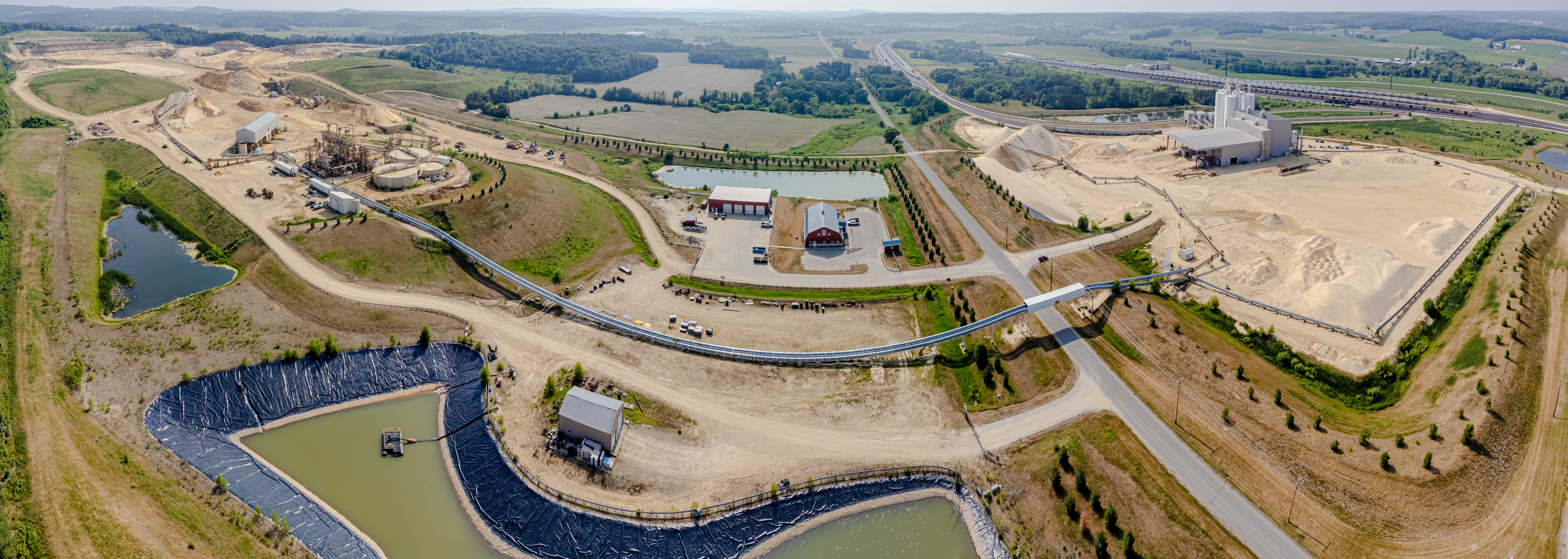
Frac sand facility in Blair, Wisconsin

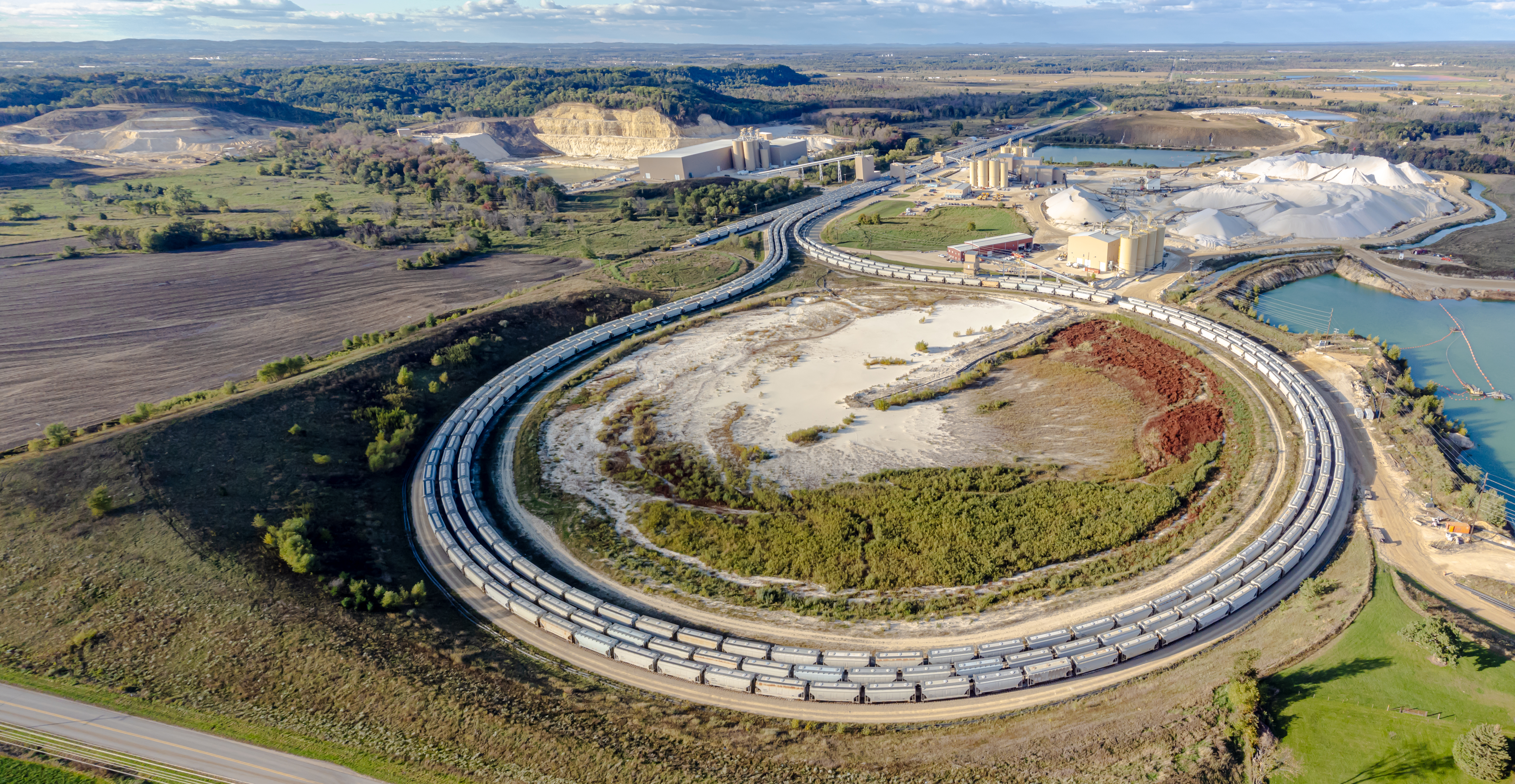
Frac sand mine in the Town of Oakdale, Wisconsin with a large looped track with 3 rail lines

Silica sand mining business has more than doubled since 2009 because of the need for this particular type of sand, which is used in a process known as hydraulic fracturing. Wisconsin is one of the five states that produce nearly 2/3 of the nation's silica. As of 2009, Wisconsin, along with other northern states, is facing an industrial mining boom, being dubbed the "sand rush" because of the new demand from large oil companies for silica sand. According to Minnesota Public Radio, "One of the industry's major players, U.S. Silica, says its sand sales tied to hydraulic fracturing nearly doubled to $70 million from 2009 to 2010 and brought in nearly $70 million in just the first nine months of 2011." According to the Wisconsin Department of Natural Resources (WDNR), there are currently 34 active mines and 25 mines in development in Wisconsin. In 2012, the WDNR released a final report on the silica sand mining in Wisconsin titled Silica Sand Mining in Wisconsin. The recent boom in silica sand mining has caused concern from residents in Wisconsin that include quality of life issues and the threat of silicosis. According to the WDNR (2012) these issues include noise, lights, hours of operation, damage and excessive wear to roads from trucking traffic, public safety concerns from the volume of truck traffic, possible damage and annoyance resulting from blasting, and concerns regarding aesthetics and land use changes.

As of 2013, industrial frac sand mining has become a cause for activism, especially in the Driftless Area of southeast Minnesota, northeast Iowa and southwest Wisconsin.

=== China ===
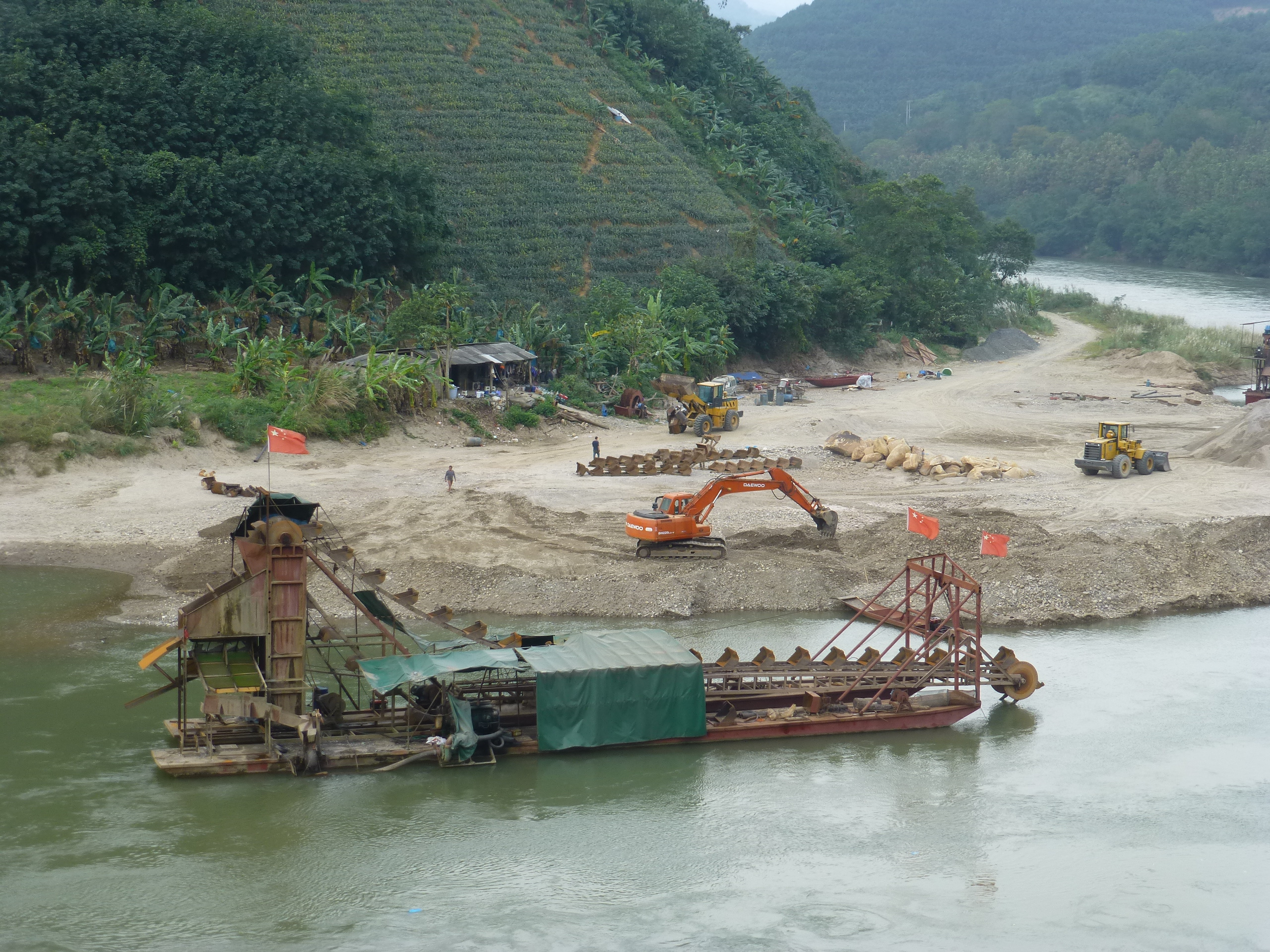
A sand mining operation in the Red River, in Jinping County, Yunnan

Much sand is extracted by dredges from the bottom of rivers such as the Red River in Yunnan, or quarried in dry river beds. Due to the large demand for sand for construction, illicit sand mining is not uncommon.

In 2020 the Coast Guard Administration of the neighboring country of Taiwan expelled or detained nearly 4,000 Chinese sand dredging vessels. Illegal sand dredging by Chinese vessels causes environmental damage in Taiwan as well as the Philippines.

== Illegal mining ==
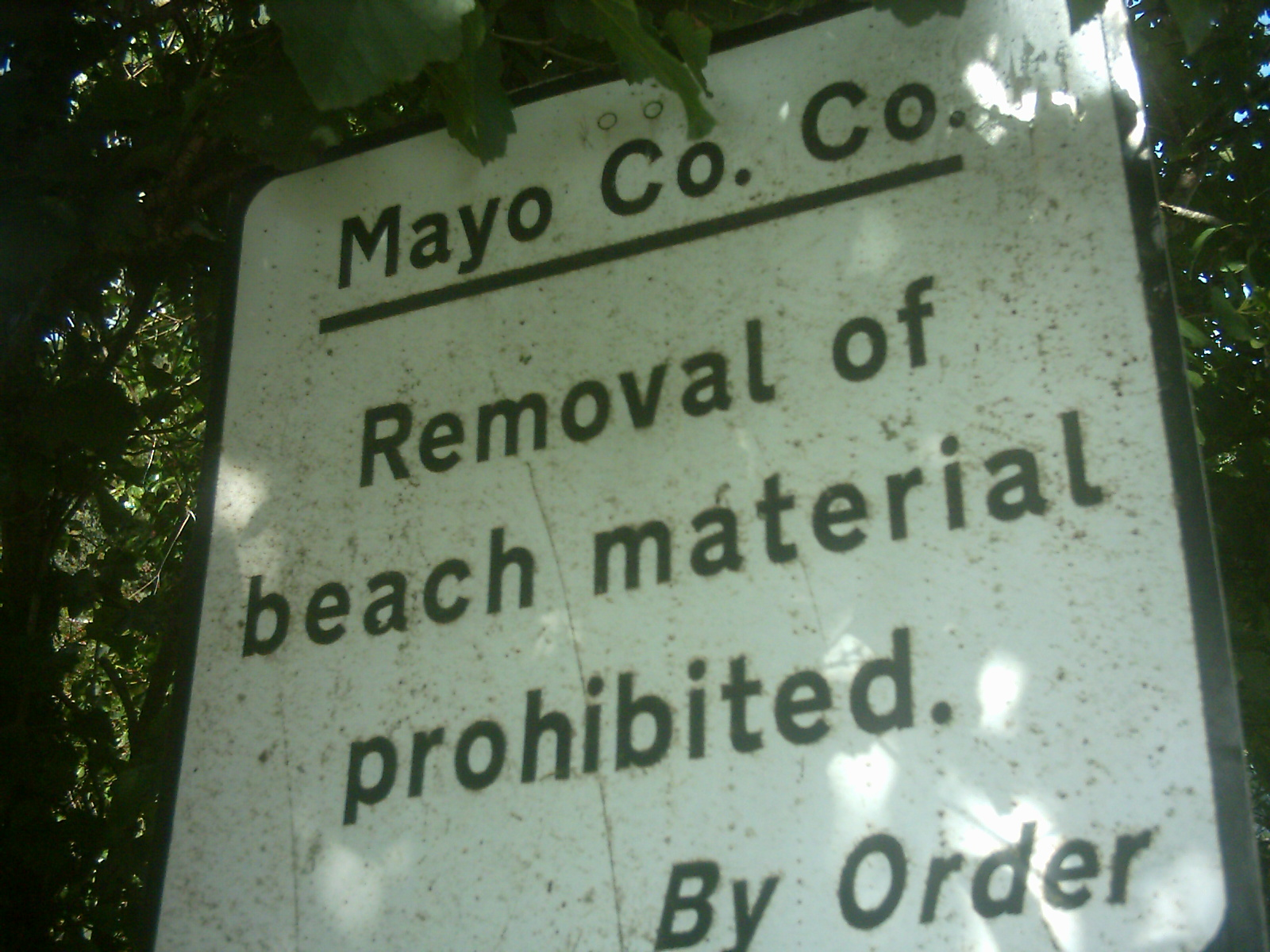
Sign in County Mayo, Ireland, forbidding the removal of sand and stones from a beach.

Sand theft or unauthorised or illegal sand mining leads to a relatively unknown global example of natural and non-renewable resource depletion problem comparable in extent to global water scarcity. Beach theft is illegal removal of large quantities of sand from a beach leading to full or partial disappearance of the beach. In India, illegal sand mining is the country's largest organized criminal activity. Sand theft feeds the illegal sand trade, a black market estimated to be worth between $200B and $350B a year. Illegal removal of sand damages river and marine ecosystems.

== See also ==
- Beach theft
- Environmental issues with mining
- Heavy mineral sands ore deposits
- Resource depletion
- Sand mining in Kerala
- Sand mining in Tamil Nadu
