= FIGRA =

Annual festival of documentary films

- Location: France
- Founded: 1993
- Awards: Grand Prize of FIGRA, Special Prize of Jury, Prize of Public
- Language: French
- Website: https://www.figra.fr/

== Other Links ==
- (fr)Pour ses 30 ans, le Figra à Douai en première ligne d’un monde tourmenté on Le Monde
- (fr)Un documentaire sur le groupe de mercenaires Wagner lauréat du Grand prix du Figra on Le Figaro
