= Sand theft =

Unauthorized or illegal mining of sand

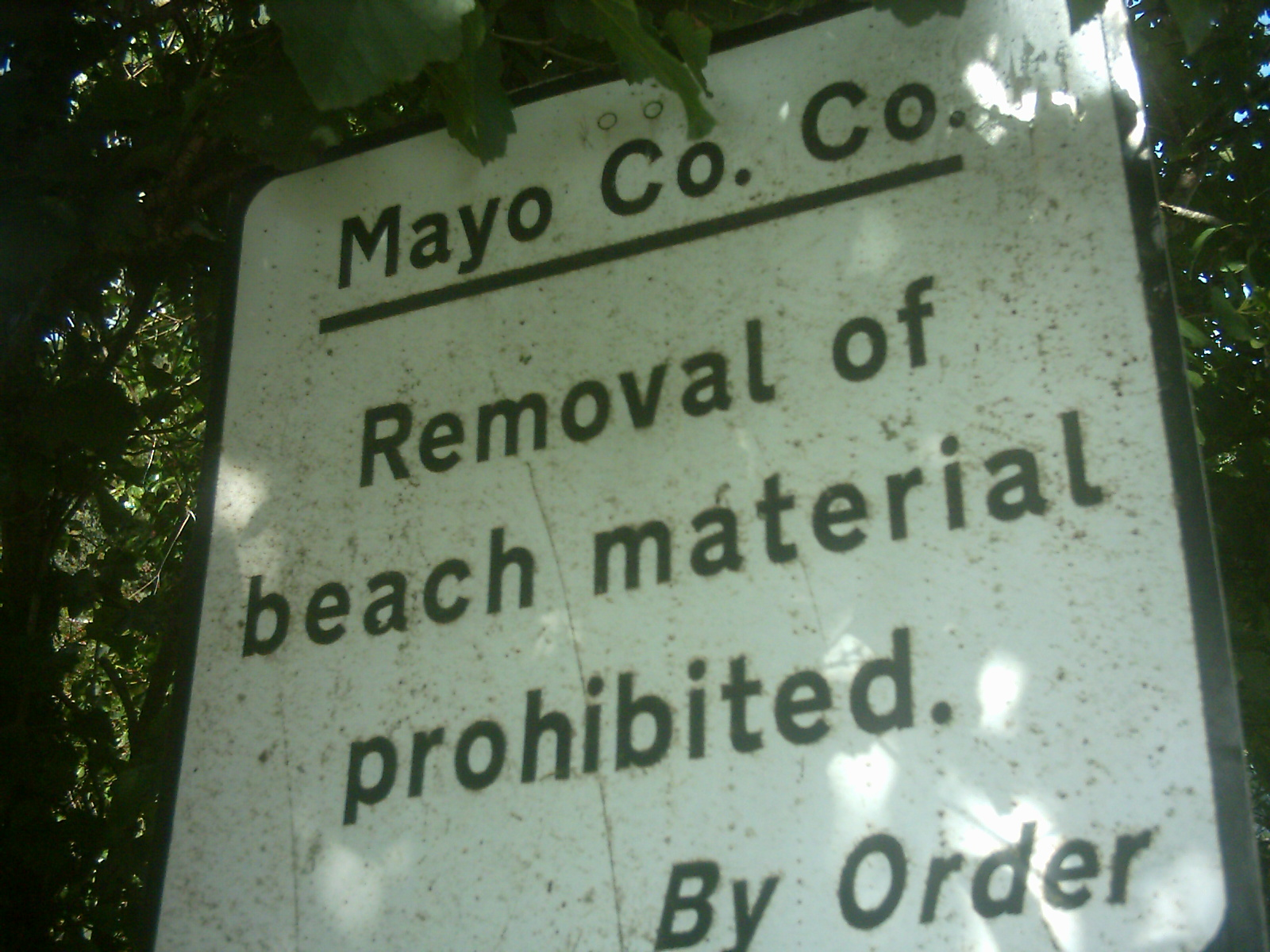
Sign in County Mayo, Ireland, forbidding the removal of sand and stones from a beach.

Sand theft or unauthorised or illegal sand mining leads to a relatively unknown global example of natural and non-renewable resource depletion problem comparable in extent to global water scarcity. Beach theft is illegal removal of large quantities of sand from a beach leading to full or partial disappearance of the beach. In India, illegal sand mining is the country's largest organized criminal activity. Sand theft feeds the illegal sand trade, a black market estimated to be worth between $200B and $350B a year. Illegal removal of sand damages river and marine ecosystems.

== Sand and beach theft by country ==
Sand theft is a worldwide phenomenon. Beach theft, the large-scale removal of sand to the point that entire stretches of a beach disappear, is considerably less common.

Two instances of beach thefts have been widely reported in the media: one in Hungary in 2007 and another in Jamaica in 2008. The beach that was stolen in Hungary was an artificially created one on the banks of a river. The other one is a genuine example of beach theft.

=== China ===
Too much sand was taken from the Yangtze River to help build Shanghai in the 1980s and 1990s, prompting the Chinese government to ban sand mining there in 2000. However, smugglers continue to take sand. They evaded capture by hacking and cloning the automatic tracking systems of other ships, leading to multiple collisions.

=== Greece ===
The pink sands of Elafonisi, created by tidal and wave-induced deposits of pigmented microorganisms living in a symbiotic relationship with native seaweed, were a frequent subject of souvenir-taking by tourists until the Greek government declared the area a nature reserve and prohibited the sands' removal; even today, color saturation levels remain at only around 10% of those in the early twentieth century.

=== Hungary ===
An incident of beach theft occurred in Hungary in 2007. In this case, multiple tonnes of sand were stolen by thieves from an artificial beach created by a resort in Mindszent alongside the banks of the Tisza river. Approximately 6,000 cubic meters of sand were shipped in and lounge chairs, playground rides, and beach huts were added. Owing to the harsh Hungarian winters, the owners of the resort covered the rides with tarpaulin and closed the resort for the season in September 2007. When one of the owners drove by, they noticed that the beach was gone.

=== India ===
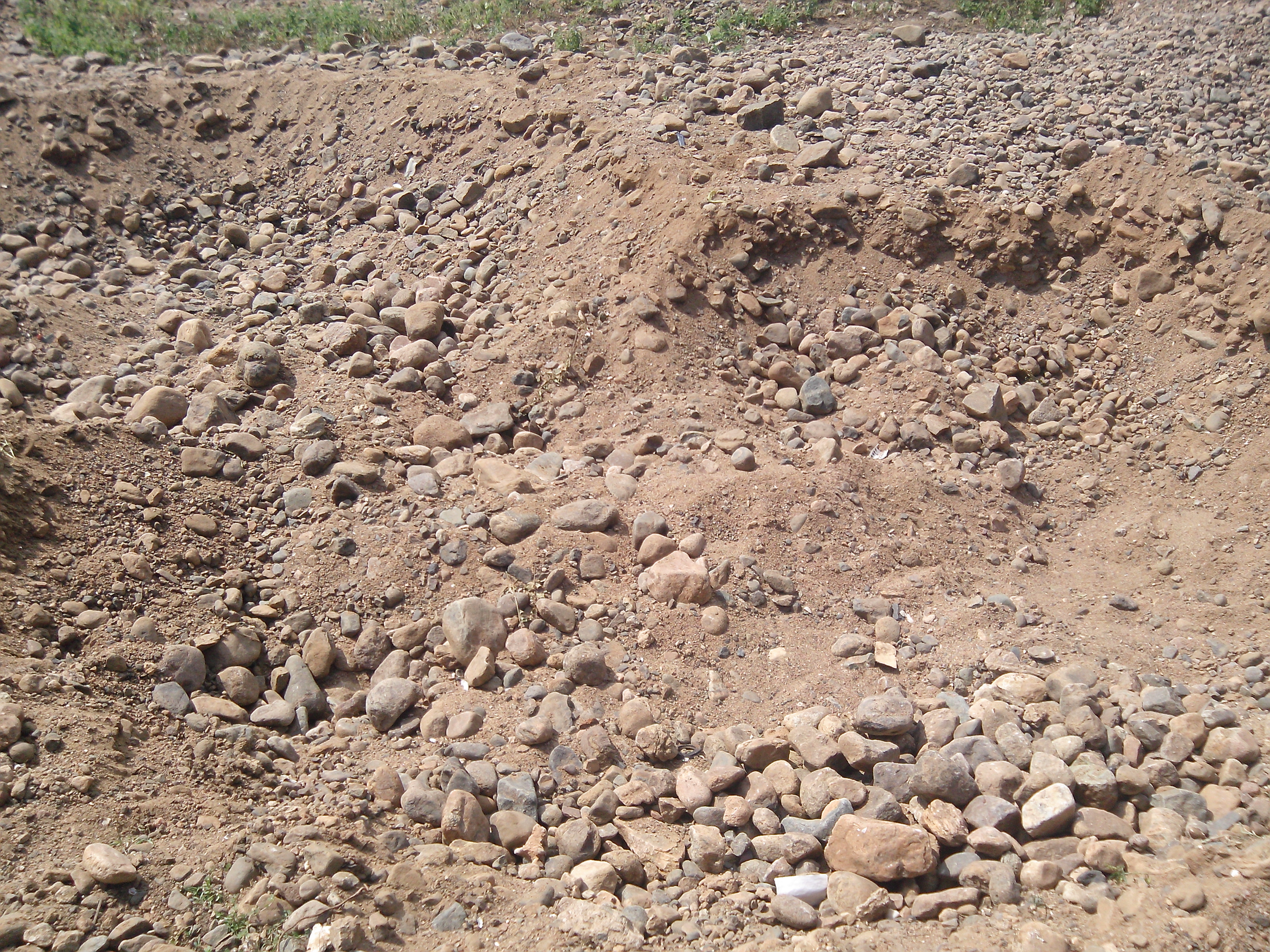
A mined river bed in Kachirapalayam

Sand thieves are referred to in India as the "sand mafia". They have been alleged to have murdered hundreds of people, including journalists, environmental activists, police officers, government officials, and others. In South India, the problem appears so pronounced that a particular Tamil term – manarkollai – has been coined.

=== Jamaica ===
Sand is used in unregulated homebuilding across the island.

Involvement by hotels was suspected in a July 2008 heist, where 500 truckloads of sand were stolen from a 400-metre stretch of beach at Coral Springs in the northern parish of Trelawny. The beach was to be part of a resort complex, but development halted after the theft. Sand was reported to have turned up on other beaches, but no charges were ever made.

=== Mexico ===
A Mexican environmental activist was murdered when he tried to stop sand mining in his village.

=== Singapore ===
Singapore is the world's largest importer of sand, using it for land reclamation that has increased the country's size by 20% since independence. Much of the imported sand has reportedly been mined illegally in Malaysia, Indonesia and Cambodia.

=== South Africa ===
A murder in South Africa was associated with rival gangs of sand miners fighting over sand.

=== Netherlands ===
In the Netherlands, approximately 60,000 m³ of sand was sold in connection with the development of the Heyerhoven golf course in Venlo. In January 2025, De Limburger reported that the province of Limburg was closely monitoring further excavation at the site, following earlier controversy over the removal and sale of sand. The proceeds were reportedly intended to contribute to the repayment of a €950,000 crowdfunding loan.

== Effects ==
Although sand theft may seem comical, it is nonetheless a serious problem as the removal of sand facilitates soil salinisation. For example, in Cape Verde, the theft of sand has caused the soil to salinify to such a degree, that a large number of orchards were permanently destroyed in the process.

Taking sand from river systems and then transporting it can use a great deal of energy. It may also lead to ecological devastation, as it may involve completely dredging the river and its contents. If a river is depleted of sediment, it may end up flowing much faster, with serious downstream effects, including greater flooding.

== See also ==
- Illegal mining
- Beach nourishment
- Sand Wars
