= List of megaprojects in India =

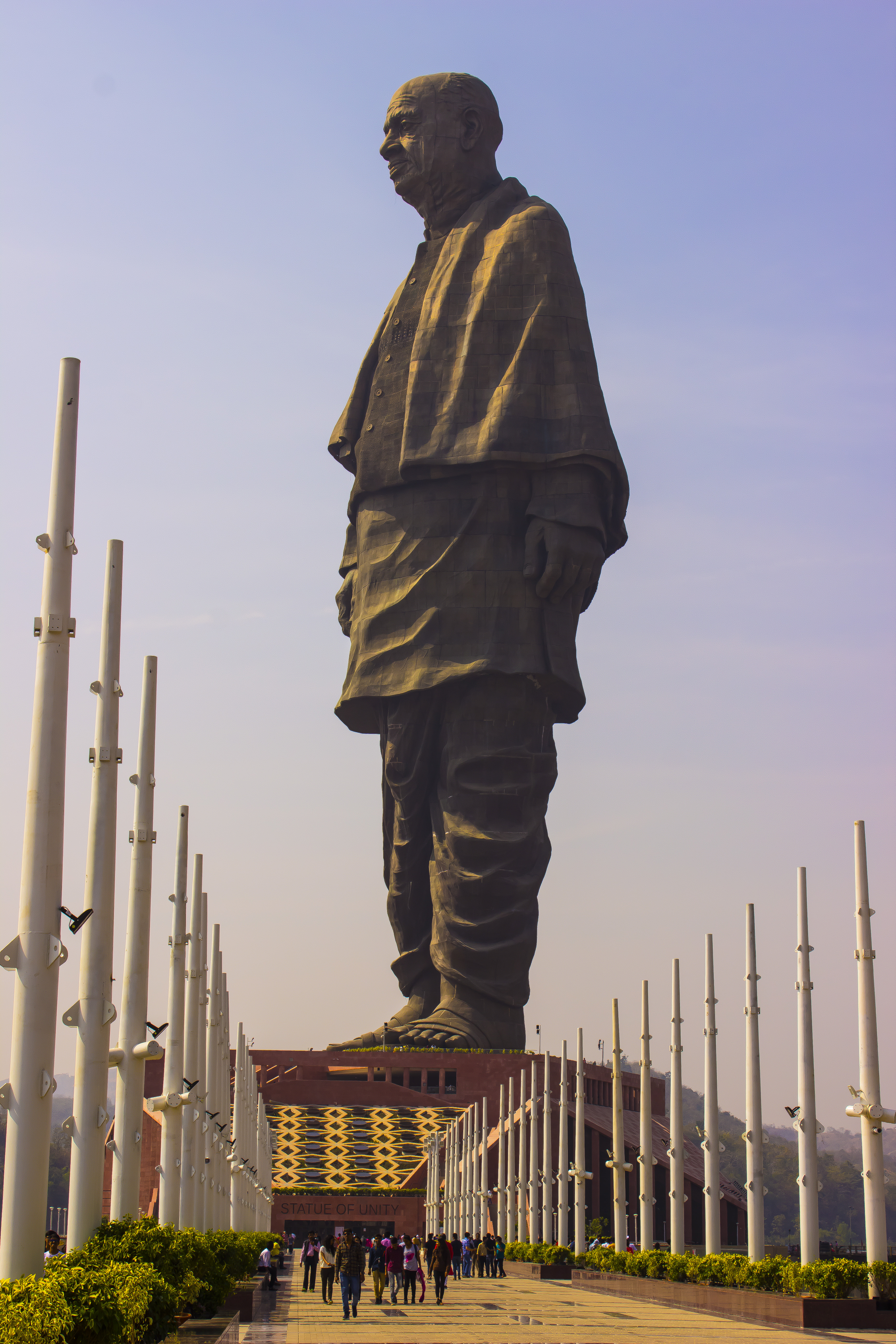
The 597-foot Statue of Unity in Gujarat – the tallest statue in the world

This is a list of Megaprojects in India. "Megaprojects are temporary endeavours (i.e., projects) characterized by large investment commitment, vast complexity (especially in organisational terms), and long-lasting impact on the economy, the environment, and society".

== Legend ==
Terms used in the status column	Status color
Proposed	
In planning, approved, under/in development, under construction, re-construction in progress, nearly complete	
On hold	
Abandoned, cancelled	
Completed	

== Bharatmala (roads and highways) projects ==
=== Sea links ===
Project	Image	Location	Status	Notes
Airoli-Katai Naka Freeway		Navi Mumbai, Maharashtra	Under construction	It will connect Navi Mumbai's Airoli Naka with Katai Naka.
Atal Setu Connector		Navi Mumbai, Maharashtra	Under construction	It will connect Atal Setu in Chirle with Mumbai-Pune Expressway in Bhatan.
Marve-Manori bridge		Mumbai, Maharashtra	Under construction	
Thane Coastal Road		Thane, Maharashtra	Under construction	
Ulwe Coastal Road		Navi Mumbai, Maharashtra	Under construction	
Dharamtar Creek Bridge		Mumbai, Maharashtra	Under construction	
Western Coastal Road		Mumbai, Maharashtra	Under construction	It will connect Mumbai's Versova with Bandra.
Versova–Virar Sea Link		Mumbai, Maharashtra	Under construction	It will connect Mumbai's Versova with Virar.
Versova–Dahisar Coastal Road		Mumbai, Maharashtra	Under construction	It will connect Mumbai's Versova with Dahisar.
Vasai Creek Bridge		Mumbai, Maharashtra	Completed	It connects Mumbai's Vasai with Mira Road.
Mumbai Trans Harbour Link		Mumbai, Maharashtra	Completed	India's longest sea bridge, with a length of 21.8 kilometers (13.5 mil)
Chhatrapati Sambhaji Maharaj Coastal Road		Mumbai, Maharashtra	Completed	It has 2.07 km long undersea twin tunnels
Nariman Point-Cuffe Parade Sea-Link		Mumbai, Maharashtra	Proposed	
Kharghar Coastal Road		Navi Mumbai, Maharashtra	Planned	
Madh-Versova Cable stayed bridge		Mumbai, Maharashtra	Planned	

=== Tunnels and border roads ===
Project	Image	Type	Location	Status	Notes
Arunachal Frontier Highway		Highway	Mago-Thingbu, Tawang to Vijaynagar, Changlang	Under construction	Border road along India-China border
Chattergala Tunnel		Highway	Union Territory of Jammu and Kashmir	Under construction	The tunnel will be 6.8 km long and will connect Kathua and Doda districts of Jammu and Kashmir via Basohli-Bani through Chattergala.
Khambatki Ghat Tunnel		Twin-tube highway tunnel	Maharashtra	Under construction	Khambatki Ghat is a mountain pass on the Pune-Kolhapur section of National Highway 48 in Maharashtra, India.
Kainchi Mod tunnel		Highway tunnel	Himachal Pradesh	Completed	48-km Kiratpur-Nerchowk four-lane project, connecting Manali through five tunnels and 22 bridges over the Sutlej
Panipat to Delhi Airport T3 Tunnel		Twin-tube highway tunnel	New Delhi	Completed	3.6 km tunnel and 2.5 km tunnel in Dwarka Expressway project
Mumbra Airoli Express Highway		Tunnel and highway	Navi Mumbai	Under construction	
Orange Gate-Marine Drive Tunnel		expressway	Mumbai	Proposed	
Kandili tunnel		Highway tunnel	Odisha	Completed	
Sunki tunnel		Highway tunnel	Odisha	Completed	
Thane-Borivali tunnel		Tunnel	Mumbai	Under construction	Construction work of the 11.80 km Thane-Borivali linking road twin-tunnel, passing underneath the Sanjay Gandhi National Park (SGNP), was set to begin in March 2022.
Goregaon-Mulund Tunnel		Tunnel	Mumbai	Under construction	
Kharghar-Turbhe Tunnel		Tunnel	Navi Mumbai	Under construction	
Trans-Arunachal Highway		Highway	Arunachal Pradesh	Semi-operational	Will be fully operational by April 2025
Zoji-la Tunnel		Tunnel	Ladakh	Under construction	
Shinku La Pass Tunnel		Tunnel	Shingo La	Under construction	World's highest tunnel at Shinku La Pass to connect Himachal to Ladakh
Atal Tunnel		Tunnel	Rohtang Pass in Pir Panjal in Himachal Pradesh	Completed	Longest highway single-tube tunnel above 10,000 feet (3,048 m) in the world
Banihal Qazigund Road Tunnel		Controlled-access highway	Union Territory of Jammu and Kashmir	Completed	One of India's longest tunnels, 8.45 km (5.25 mi) long
Dr. Syama Prasad Mookerjee Tunnel		Controlled-access highway	Union Territory of Jammu and Kashmir	Completed	India's longest tunnel, 9.20 km length
Igatpuri Tunnel		Tunnel	Maharasthra	Completed	8.2 km tunnel is part of Mumbai–Nagpur Expressway
Kasara Tunnel		Tunnel	Maharasthra	Completed	7.7 km tunnel is part of Mumbai–Nagpur Expressway
Mumbai-Pune Missing Link Tunnel		Tunnel	Maharasthra	Completed	8.9 km tunnel is part of Mumbai–Pune Missing Link Expressway
Kuthiran Tunnel		Twin-tube highway tunnel	Kerala	Completed	This is Kerala's first-ever tunnel for road transport and South India's longest six-lane road tunnel.
Maroge Tunnel		Tunnel	Kashmir	Completed	
Umling La		Motorable road	Ladakh	Completed	World's highest motorable road, located at an altitude of 19,300 feet (5,883 m), constructed by Border Roads Organisation (BRO)
Pragati Maidan Tunnel		Tunnel	New Delhi	Completed	Pragati Maidan Tunnel is a 1.3-km-long facility built by the Public Works Department (PWD) at an expenditure of Rs 9.20 billion as part of Pragati Maidan Integrated Transit Corridor Project.
Nechiphu Tunnel		Tunnel	Arunachal Pradesh	Completed	
Theng Tunnel		Tunnel	Sikkim	Completed	Theng Tunnel is a road tunnel on the Chungthang-Mangan (Gangtok-Chungthang) highway in North Sikkim. The 578 meters long tunnel is the longest tunnel in the state of Sikkim.
Rewa Sidhi Tunnel		Hybrid of aqueduct and tunnel	Madhya Pradesh	Completed	Newly opened, Madhya Pradesh's longest tunnel brings Rewa-Sidhi closer by 7 km. Nitin Gadkari said it is the first aqueduct of India. Bansagar canal and road have been built on it. The NH39 tunnel has been built on one of the most difficult terrains at a cost of around Rs 10.04 billion.
Sela Tunnel		Tunnel	Arunachal Pradesh	Completed	
Z-Morh Tunnel		Tunnel	Union Territory of Jammu and Kashmir	Completed	
Parikrama Path Project		Intrastate border road	Gujarat	Planned	

=== Char dham Pariyojana ===
Project	Type	Location	Status	Notes
Char Dham Highway	Regional road	Uttarakhand	Under construction	Char Dham National Highway, is an under construction two-lane (in each direction) express 719 km National Highway with a minimum width of 10 metres in the Indian state of Uttarakhand.

=== Roads and expressways ===
Project	Type	Location	Status	Notes
Amritsar–Jamnagar Expressway	Expressway	Rajasthan, Punjab, Gujarat	823 Km Rajasthan and Gujarat section fully operational	Amritsar–Jamnagar Expressway (NH-754) is an under-construction 1,257 km long, 4/6-lane expressway in northwestern India.
Pune–Bengaluru Expressway	Expressway	Karnataka, Maharashtra	Planned	Bangalore-Pune Expressway is an eight-lane access-controlled 700 km long expressway
Chirle-Palaspe Elevated Corridor	Expressway	Navi Mumbai, Maharashtra	Planned	The 6.5-km-long elevated route between Chirle and Palaspe will reduce travel time to five minutes.
Sewri-Worli Elevated Corridor	Expressway	Mumbai, Maharashtra	Planned	The 4.51 km long elevated grade-separated expressway between Sewri and Worli
Bundelkhand Expressway	Expressway	Uttar Pradesh	Completed	Currently, Bundelkhand Expressway is a 296 km long, 4-lane (expandable to 6) under-construction access-controlled expressway in the state of Uttar Pradesh, India
Purvanchal Expressway	Expressway	Uttar Pradesh	Completed	Currently, India's longest expressway at 340.8 km.
Delhi–Meerut Expressway	Expressway	Delhi and Uttar Pradesh	Completed	
Dwarka Expressway	Expressway	Delhi and Gurugram	Completed	
Delhi–Amritsar–Katra Expressway	Expressway	Delhi, Haryana, Punjab and Jammu and Kashmir	188.82km open for traffic (Haryana section fully operational and 30km Punjab section operational), partially open	Delhi–Amritsar–Katra Expressway is an approved 670 km (420 mi) long, four-lane (expandable to eight lanes) controlled-access expressway, which will connect Bahadurgarh border in Delhi with Katra in Jammu and Kashmir via Nakodar and Gurdaspur in Punjab. It is targeted for completion by FY2025
Delhi–Dehradun Expressway	Expressway	Delhi and Uttarakhand	Completed	Delhi–Saharanpur–Dehradun Expressway is an under-construction 239 km access controlled expressway in India.
Delhi–Mumbai Expressway	Expressway	Delhi, Haryana, Rajasthan, Madhya Pradesh, Gujarat and Maharashtra	Partially opened	World's longest continuous eight-lane expressway in a country when completed at 1380 km.
Ganga Expressway	Expressway	Uttar Pradesh	Completed	Ganga Expressway is an under-construction 1047 km long, 6-lane (expandable to 8) greenfield expressway in the state of Uttar Pradesh, India.
Gorakhpur Link Expressway	Expressway	Uttar Pradesh	Completed	Gorakhpur Link Expressway is a 4-lane (expandable to 6) expressway in the Indian state of Uttar Pradesh.
Mumbai–Nagpur Expressway	Expressway	Maharashtra	Completed	Nagpur–Mumbai Super Communication Expressway (officially known as Maharashtra Samruddhi Mahamarg) is an under-construction 6-lane (expandable to 8) 701 km long access-controlled expressway in Maharashtra, India.
Nagpur–Hyderabad–Bengaluru Expressway	Expressway	Maharashtra, Telangana, Andhra Pradesh and Karnataka	Planned	
Mangalore–Bengaluru Expressway	Expressway	Karnataka	Planned	This 290 km expressway will be the longest expressway in Karnataka, connecting to the Chennai–Bengaluru Expressway and the west coastal city of Mangalore. It will provide easy access from North Karkala and coastal Karnataka to Bengaluru, becoming an economic lifeline for both Karnataka .
Nagpur–Goa Expressway	Expressway	Maharashtra, Goa	Approved	This 760 km expressway will be the longest expressway in Maharashtra.
Narmada Expressway	Expressway	Madhya Pradesh	Planned	This 1300 km expressway will be the world's second longest eight lane expressway. after Delhi–Mumbai Expressway.
Western Peripheral Expressway part of Delhi outer ring corridor	Expressway	Haryana	Completed	135.6 km (84.3 mi)-long expressway
Eastern Peripheral Expressway part of Delhi outer ring corridor	Expressway	Uttar Pradesh	Completed	KGP Expressway is a 135 km (84 mi) long, six-lane expressway.
Raipur–Visakhapatnam Expressway	Expressway	Chhattisgarh, Odisha and Andhra Pradesh	Under construction	465 km greenfield expressway connects several economic hubs including Jagdalpur, Umerkote, Papadahandi, Nabarangpur, Borigumma, Jeypore, Koraput, Semiliguda and Vizianagaram.
Surat–Chennai Expressway	Expressway	Gujarat, Maharashtra, Telangana and Tamil Nadu	Under construction	The 1271 km corridor will pass through Nasik, Ahmednagar, Solapur, Kalaburgi, Kurnool, Kadappa & Tirupati to link Gujarat, Maharashtra, Telangana and Tamil Nadu.
Sohna Elevated Corridor	Expressway	Gurugram and Sohna	Completed	
Trans-Haryana Expressway	Expressway	Kurukshetra district and Narnaul	Completed	This 313 km 6-lane controlled-access highway will provide seamless connectivity between Ambala and Kotputli for the traffic originating from Himachal Pradesh, Chandigarh and Ambala.
Urban Extension Road-II	Expressway	New Delhi	Completed	75 km long urban extension road has added to act as an additional western ring road in New Delhi, thereby decongesting National Highway 1 section between Rohini, Delhi to the Singhu border. It is targeted to be completed by FY2024.
Ahmedabad–Dholera Expressway	Expressway	Gujarat	Completed	110-km road expressway will connect Ahmedabad to Dholera Special Investment Region and Dholera Airport. It will provide interconnectivity to Delhi–Mumbai Expressway. It is target for completion by FY2024.
Bangalore–Chennai Expressway	Expressway	Chennai and Bangalore	Karnataka section 71km open for traffic; under construction	262-km expressway corridor enhances the freight connectivity between two key economic hubs of South India while passing through states – Karnataka, Tamil Nadu and Andhra Pradesh. It is expected for completion by FY2025.
Lucknow–Kanpur Expressway	Expressway	Uttar Pradesh	Completed	63 km expressway connecting the cities of Kanpur and Lucknow will decongest the existing stretch by providing an alternate route.
Kolkata–Varanasi Expressway	Expressway	Uttar Pradesh, Bihar, Jharkhand and West Bengal	Under construction	612-km economic corridor reduces the distance between Varanasi and Kolkata by 63 km. The construction is expected to start in FY2023 and with the corridor opening to traffic by FY26.
Bengaluru–Vijayawada Expressway	Expressway	Karnataka and Andhra Pradesh	Planned	343-km expressway will connect Bangalore to Vijayawada while passing through key economic nodes surrounding two cities like Anantapur, Kadapa, Nellore and Machilipatnam.

== Defense projects ==
=== Air defense ===
Project name	Type	Image	Status	Description
Kaveri Derivative Engine(KDE)	Fighter jet		Testing phase	Kaveri Derivative Engine was the dry section of the original Kaveri engine, now a new afterburner from BrahMos Aerospace and hollow reheat module which will be used in Tejas LSP jet fighter for upcoming testing with total thrust of 73-76kN hence India becoming the 3rd country in the world after Germany and UK to develop Jet engine from scratch instead of technology transfer.
Indian Multi Role Helicopter	Helicopter		Under construction	The Indian Multi-Role Helicopter (IMRH) is a medium-lift helicopter currently under development by Hindustan Aeronautics Limited (HAL) for Indian Armed forces for air assault, air-attack, anti-submarine, anti-surface, military transport and VIP transport roles. IMRH is aimed to replace all the current Mil Mi-17 and Mil Mi-8 helicopters across the Indian armed forces.
HAL Light Utility Helicopter	Helicopter		Completed	The HAL Light Utility Helicopter (LUH) along with its derivative Light Observation Helicopter (LOH) was designed and developed by Rotary Wing Research and Design Center (RWR&DC), one of the R&D sections of Hindustan Aeronautics Limited (HAL) for civilian and military applications.
HAL Prachand	Attack helicopter		Completed	The HAL Prachand (IPA: prəcəɳɖ, lit."Fierce") is an Indian multi-role, light attack helicopter designed and manufactured by the Hindustan Aeronautics Limited (HAL) under project LCH. It has been ordered by the Indian Air Force and the Indian Army. Its flight ceiling is the highest among all attack helicopters in the world.
Tejas MK1A	Fighter jet		Completed	
Tejas MK2	Fighter jet		Under construction	The HAL Tejas Mark 2, or Medium Weight Fighter (MWF), is an Indian single-engine, canard delta wing, multirole combat aircraft designed by the Aeronautical Development Agency (ADA) in collaboration with Aircraft Research and Design Centre (ARDC) of Hindustan Aeronautics Limited (HAL) for the Indian Air Force (IAF). It is a further development of the HAL Tejas, with an elongated airframe, close coupled canards, new sensors, and a more powerful engine.
AMCA	Fighter jet		Under construction	The Advanced Medium Combat Aircraft (AMCA) is an Indian programme to develop a fifth-generation stealth, multirole, air superiority fighter for the Indian Air Force and the Indian Navy which will also include 6th Generation niche technologies.
TEDBF	Fighter jet		Under construction	The HAL Twin Engine Deck Based Fighter (TEDBF) is a canard delta wing, twin-engine, carrier based, multirole combat aircraft currently under development for the Indian Navy. The TEDBF is being designed and developed by the Aeronautical Development Agency (ADA), and will be manufactured by Hindustan Aeronautics Limited (HAL). The TEDBF is intended to perform a multitude of missions, including air supremacy, air interdiction, anti access/area denial (A2/AD), anti-ship warfare (ASW) and electronic warfare (EW) missions.
DRDO Ghatak	Unmanned combat aerial vehicle		Under construction	The Ghatak is an autonomous jet powered stealthy unmanned combat air vehicle (UCAV), being developed by the Aeronautical Development Establishment (ADE).
HAL Combat Air Teaming System			Under construction	The HAL Combat Air Teaming System (CATS) is an Indian unmanned and manned combat aircraft air teaming system being developed by Hindustan Aeronautics Limited (HAL). The system will consist of a manned fighter aircraft acting as "mothership" of the system and a set of swarming UAVs and UCAVs governed by the mothership aircraft. A twin-seated HAL Tejas is likely to be the mothership aircraft. Various other sub components of the system are currently under development and will be jointly produced by HAL, National Aerospace Laboratories (NAL), Defence Research and Development Organisation (DRDO) and Newspace Research & Technologies.

=== Naval defense ===
==== Warships ====
Project	Image	Status	Note
INS Vikrant		Completed	An aircraft carrier constructed by the Cochin Shipyard Limited (CSL) at Kerala for the Indian Navy. It is the first aircraft carrier to be built in India. It is named Vikrant as a tribute to India's first aircraft carrier, INS Vikrant (1961). The name Vikrant means "courageous" in Sanskrit. The motto of the ship, "जयेम सं युधिस्पृधः", means "I defeat those who fight against me".
INS Vikrant IAC-II	proposed Vikrant class carrier IAC-II.	Proposed	Indian Navy had been pushing for a 65,000 tonne carrier, but the demand has been put on hold due to expenses and technologies needed on board. So now Navy is considering another 45,000-tonne class carrier, same as INS Vikrant, but with more indigenous systems and better propulsions
INS Vishal		Planned	The third aircraft carrier after INS Vikrant
INS Mormugao		Completed	INS Mormugao is the second ship of the Visakhapatnam-class stealth guided-missile destroyers of the Indian Navy. She was built at Mazagon Dock Limited (MDL), and was launched on 17 September 2016. The ship was commissioned on 18 December 2022.
INS Dhruv		Completed	INS Dhruv (A40) is a research vessel and missile range instrumentation ship built by India's Hindustan Shipyard Limited (HSL). The ship was earlier only known by its shipyard designated yard number, VC-11184.
INS Nilgiri		Completed	INS Nilgiri is the lead ship of Seven Nilgiri-class stealth guided missile frigates built by Mazagon Shipyard Dock Limited for the Indian Navy.
INS Himgiri		Completed	INS Nilgiri is the lead ship of the Nilgiri-class stealth guided missile frigates built by Mazagon Shipyard Dock Limited for the Indian Navy.
INS Anvesh		Completed	INS Anvesh (A41) is a missile range instrumentation ship (also termed as a "Floating Test Range" (FTR)) built for the Indian Navy. Designed by the Defence Research and Development Organisation (DRDO) and built by Cochin Shipyard Limited (CSL).
INS Talwar		Completed	
INS Tamal		Completed	
INS Nistar		Completed	Nistar class is a diving support vessels being built by Hindustan Shipyard (HSL) for the Indian Navy.

==== Submarines ====
Project	Image	Status	Note
INS Vagir		Completed	INS Vagir (S25) is the fifth submarine of the first batch of six Kalvari-class submarines for the Indian Navy.
INS Arihant		Completed	
S5-class submarine		Planned	
Fuel-cell air independent propulsion (AIP)		Completed	The Naval Materials Research Laboratory of Indian Defence Research and Development Organisation in collaboration with Larsen & Toubro and Thermax has developed a 270 kilowatt phosphoric acid fuel cell (PAFC) to power the Kalvari-class submarines. It produces electricity by reacting with hydrogen generated from sodium borohydride and stored oxygen with phosphoric acid acting as an electrolyte.

== Industrial corridors projects ==
=== Industrial corridors ===
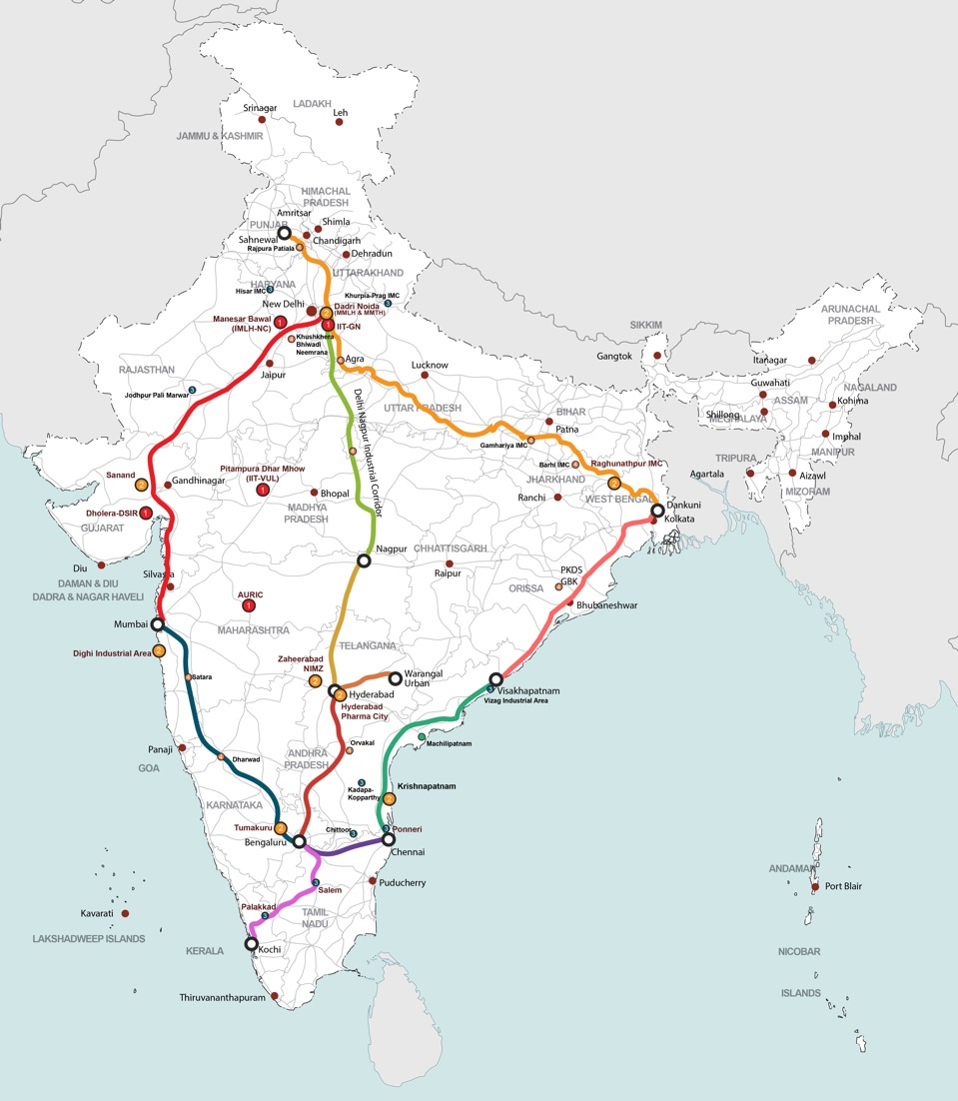
Industrial corridors in India

Project	Location	Status	Notes
Delhi-Mumbai Industrial Corridor	nationwide	In progress	
Amritsar–Kolkata Industrial Corridor	nationwide	In progress	
Chennai Bangalore Industrial Corridor	South India	In progress	
Mumbai-Bangalore economic corridor	nationwide	In progress	
Odisha Economic Corridor	nationwide	In progress	
Visakhapatnam–Chennai Industrial Corridor	South India	In progress	
East Coast Economic Corridor	nationwide	In progress	
Udhana-Palsana Industrial Corridor	nationwide	In progress	–
Hyderabad-Nagpur Industrial Corridor	nationwide	In progress	
Hyderabad-Warangal Industrial Corridor	nationwide	In progress	
Delhi-Nagpur Industrial Corridor	nationwide	In progress	
Tamil Nadu Defence Industrial Corridor	nationwide	In progress	
IMT Sohna	nationwide	In progress	
IMT Kharkhoda	nationwide	In progress	
Uttar Pradesh Defence Industrial Corridor	nationwide	In progress	

=== Steel plants ===
Name	Location	Operator	Notes	Status
Essar Steel Hazira Plant	Hazira, Gujrat	ArcelorMittal Nippon Steel	Initially started with a capacity of 2MTPA in the liberalisation era, the plant quickly scaled over 10MTPA, becoming one of the world's largest integrated steel mills.	
Nagarnar Steel Plant	Chhattisgarh	NMDC Steel Ltd.	Government of India under Ministry of Steel is setting up a 3 MTPA capacity greenfield Integrated Steel Plant based on Hi-Smelt technology in Nagarnar, located 16 km from Jagdalpur in Chhattisgarh state with an estimated outlay of Rs. 255 billion. This is the only new large-scale steel plant currently fully ready to start production India, with little likelihood of a new plant of similar size plant coming up in the next few years.	
Jindal Stainless	Hisar	Jindal Stainless	World's first hydrogen based DRI commercial steel plant	Completed
Saarloha Advanced Materials Green Steel Plant	Pune	Saarloha Advanced Materials		
Ankur Udyog Ltd. Integrated Steel Plant	Gorakhpur	Ankur Udyog Ltd.		Completed
Lloyd's Metal Konsari Steel Plant	Konsari, Maharashtra	Lloyd's Metal & Energy Ltd.	The Integrated Steel Plant in Konsari has received Megaproject status from Government of Maharashtra.	Completed
Shyam Steel Integrated Steel Plant	Purulia, West Bengal	Shyam Steel	It is being built at a cost of Rs. 34.45 billion in Raghunathpur, Purulia, West Bengal. Huge steel plant in the Indian state of West Bengal in Asia.	
Jai Raj Ispat Nigam Ltd. Integrated Steel Plant	Kurnool, Andhra Pradesh	Jai Raj Ispat Nigam Ltd.		
AP High grades steel	Peddandlur, YSR Kadapa	YSR Steel Corporation		
JSW Utkal Steel	Paradeep	JSW Steel		
JSW Kadapa Steel	Sunnapurallapalli, YSR Kadapa	JSW Steel		
SAIL Paradeep Steel Plant	Paradeep	SAIL		
Jai Balaji Steels Purulia Ltd	Purulia, West Bengal	Jai Balaji Steels		
NMDC Karnataka steel plant	Ballari, Karnataka	NMDC Steel Ltd.		
Xindia Steels Karnataka plant	Hospete	Xindia Steels Ltd		
MSP Metallics Odisha steel plant	Sambalpur	MSP Metallics		
JSW BPSL Potka	Potka, Jharkhand	JSW BPSL		

=== Metal/alloy plants ===
Name	Type	Location	Status	Notes	Operator
Adani copper plant	Copper	Mundra, Gujarat	Completed		Adani Group
Anrak Aluminum	Alloy factory	Kothapalem, Andhra Pradesh	Completed		Pioneer Aluminium Industries Limited
MIDHANI Plate Mill	Alloy factory	Hyderabad	Completed		
PTC Industries	Electron beam cold hearth remelting (EBCHR) furnace	Bhatgaon, Lucknow	Completed	PTC Industries successfully built a titanium recycling plant for aerospace components.	
Saraf Titanium	Titanium	Gopalpur port	Closed		
Kerala Minerals and Metals	Titanium	Kollam	Completed	KMML with help of technology transfer from DMRL produces titanium sponge.	
Nicomet	Cobalt, Nickel	Goa	Completed	India's only nickel and cobalt producer	
Jindal Aluminium Limited	Alloy factory	Bhiwadi	Completed		Jindal Group
Hindustan Platinum	Metal refinery	Navi Mumbai	Completed		
Utkarsha Aluminium Dhatu Nigam Limited (UADNL)	Aluminium plant	Talamanchi, Andhra Pradesh	Under construction		
OSCOM – Rare Earth Extraction Plant (REEP)	Rare earth extraction plant	Chhatrapur, Odisha	Completed		
Rare Earth Permanent Magnet (REPM) Vizag	Permanent magnet factory	Visakhapatnam	Completed		

=== Fertilizer plants ===
Project	Product	Type	Location	Status	Notes
Matix Fertilisers	Neem Coated urea	Fertilizer plant	Panagadh	Completed	
HURL Barauni	Neem coated urea	Fertilizer plant	Urvarak Nagar Barauni	Completed	
HURL Sindri	Neem coated urea	Fertilizer plant	Sindri	Completed	
HURL Gorakhpur	Neem Coated Urea	Fertilizer plant	Gorakhpur	Completed	
Talcher Fertilizers		Fertilizer plant	Talcher	Under construction	
Ramagundam Fertilizers & Chemicals Limited	Neem coated urea	Fertilizer plant	Ramagundam	Completed	
Rashtriya Chemicals & Fertilizers Thal Plant	nano urea	Fertilizer plant	Thal, Raigad	Under construction	
IFFCO Nano Urea Deoghar Plant	nano urea	Fertilizer plant	Deoghar, Jharkhand	Under construction	

=== Manufacturing plants and industries ===
Project	Type	Location	Status	Notes
Adani Solar	Silicon ingot	Mundra, Gujarat	Completed	Adani with this facility became India's sole producer of monocrystalline silicon ingots for M10 and G12 wafers.
Amul Milk Plant	Milk	Varanasi, Uttar Pradesh	Completed	The plant will be set up with an investment of $34 million to $42 million and will process 500,000 liters of milk daily.
Shree Cement Manufacturing Plant	Cement	West Bengal	Completed	Construction of the plant in Purulia, West Bengal was expected to be completed by 2024. It is being built at a cost of Rs. 6 billion.
Kakatiya Mega Textile Park	Textile industrial complex	Warangal	Completed	
Ola's Future Factory	Electric vehicle	Tamil Nadu	Completed	The world's largest electric two-wheeler plant
BHEL Coal to Methanol Plant	Methanol	Hyderabad	Completed	India inaugurated its first BHEL-built 'coal to methanol' (CTM) pilot plant on January 19, 2022. The plant was inaugurated in BHEL's Hyderabad unit. The 0.25 TPD (tonnes per day) capacity CTM pilot plant was indigenously designed, developed and installed by BHEL.
NTPC Methanol Plant	Methanol	Madhya Pradesh	Completed	Jakson Green, a Noida-based company, is setting up the methanol plant for NTPC.
NLC Methanol Plant	Methanol	Neyveli, Tamil Nadu	Under construction	Engineers India is the technology transfer partner in a gasification of lignite to methanol project.
NTPC 4G Ethanol Plant	Ethanol	Chhattisgarh	Proposed	The plant will be located in Lara, Chhattisgarh and will produce 10 tonnes per day of 4G ethanol from flue gases emitted from power plants. Jakson Green is setting up the plant.
INOXCVA Cryogenic Equipment Plant	Cryogenic equipment	Gujarat	Under construction	

=== Refineries ===
Project	Fuel type	Location	Status	Notes
Barmer Refinery	Oil	Rajasthan	Completed	Barmer Refinery is an upcoming public sector refinery and petrochemical complex in the Pachpadra near Balotra in Barmer district of Rajasthan, India. It is being designed by EIL and is owned by HPCL Rajasthan Refinery Limited (HRRL), a joint venture between Hindustan Petroleum Corporation Limited and the Government of Rajasthan. The refinery is expected to commission in January 2024.
ONGC Refinery	Oil	Prayagraj	Planned	ONGC is building megarefinery in Prayagraj.
RRPCL Refinery	Oil	Ratnagiri	Proposed	
Panipat 3G Ethanol Refinery	Ethanol	Panipat	Under construction	It is world's first 3G ethanol refinery designed by Praj Industries and owned by Indian Oil Corporation
Bhatinda Ethanol Refinery	Ethanol	Bhatinda	Under construction	It is 2G ethanol refinery designed by Praj Industries and owned by HPCL Biofuels Ltd in Bhatinda
Vidarbha Refinery	Oil	Maharashtra	Proposed	EIL will conduct feasibility study for petrochemical complex in Vidarbha.
New BPCL Refinery	Oil	TBD	Proposed	
BPCL Seaport Refinery	Oil	Andhra Pradesh	Proposed	
Bargarh Refinery	Ethanol	Odisha	Completed	BPCL's 2G ethanol bio-refinery in Bargarh, Odisha, would provide momentum to India's green and sustainable growth.

=== Mines ===
Project	Metal/Resource	Discovered by	Location	Notes
Lithium Mines in Salal-Haimana area of Reasi district	Lithium	Geological Survey of India	Kashmir	Lithium reserved found in Salal-Haimana area of Reasi district
Lithium Mines in Degana's Renvat hill and its surrounding areas	Lithium	Geological Survey of India	Rajasthan	
Lithium Mines in East Singhbhum and Hazaribagh	Lithium	National Mineral Exploration Trust (NMET)	Jharkhand	
Lithium Mines in Mandya	Lithium	Atomic Minerals Directorate for Exploration and Research (AMD)	Karnataka	
Tantalum Mines in Sutlej River	Tantalum	IIT Ropar	Ropar, Punjab	
Uranium Mines in Sikar, Rohil west, Jahaz and Geratiyon ki Dhani districts	Uranium	Atomic Minerals Directorate for Exploration and Research (AMD)	Rajasthan	the Atomic Minerals Directorate for Exploration and Research (AMD) found 8,813 tonnes of uranium oxide deposits in Rohil in Sikar district, 1,086 tonnes in Rohil west, 3,570 tonnes in Jahaz and 1,002 tonnes in Geratiyon ki Dhani.
Rare earth Mines in Ananthapur district	Light Rare Earth	National Geophysical Research Institute	Ananthapur, Andhra Pradesh	The light rare earth element minerals found in Ananthapur district include allanite, cerite, thorite, columbite, tantalite, apatite, zircon, monazite, pyrochlore euxenite and fluorite.
Rare earth deposits in Alang beach	Vanadium	Geological Survey of India	Alang, Gujarat	
Rare earth Mines in Barmar district	Rare Earth	Department of Atomic Energy	Barmar, Rajasthan	
Gold Mines in Sonbhadra district	Gold	UP geology	Sonbhadra, Uttar Pradesh	
Gold Mines in Keonjhar, Mayurbhanj and Deogarh district	Gold	Directorate of Mines and Geological Survey of India	Odisha	
Gold Mines in Jamui district	Gold	Geological Survey of India	Jamui, Bihar	
Gold Mines in Jonnagiri district	Gold		Jonnagiri, Andhra Pradesh	

=== Petrochemical complexes ===
Project	Type	Location	Status	Notes
Bina Petrochemical complex	Petrochemical plant	Madhya Pradesh	Under construction	

== Gati Shakti (logistics) projects ==
=== Multi-Modal Logistics Park/Gati Shakti Cargo Terminal (GCT)/land ports ===
Project	Type	Location	Status	Notes
BPCL GCT Krishnapatnam	Oil	Krishnapatnam, Nellore	Completed	
Rupaidiha Land Port	Container based land port	Bahraich, Uttar Pradesh	Completed	It will be operated by Land Ports Authority of India.
Rewari GCT	Logistics	Rewari, Haryana	Completed	
Muddelinganahalli MMLP	Logistics	Bangalore, Karnataka	Planned	

=== Freight transportation ===
Project	Type	Location	Status	Notes	
Western Dedicated Freight Corridor	Freight transport	Uttar Pradesh, Delhi, Haryana, Rajasthan, Gujarat and Maharashtra	Operational	–	
Eastern Dedicated Freight Corridor	Freight transport	Punjab, Haryana, Uttar Pradesh, Bihar and West Bengal	Operational		–
East-West Dedicated Freight Corridor	Freight transport	Maharashtra, Madhya Pradesh, Chhattisgarh, Odisha, Jharkhand and West Bengal	Planned	–	
North-South Dedicated Freight Corridor	Freight transport	Madhya Pradesh, Maharashtra, Telangana and Andhra Pradesh	Planned	–	
East Coast Dedicated Freight Corridor	Freight transport	West Bengal, Odisha and Andhra Pradesh	Planned	–	
Haryana Orbital Rail Corridor	Freight transport	Haryana	Construction started	–	
Port-Rail Connectivity by IPRCL	Freight transport	nationwide	Partially operational		

== Parvatmala (airlifts and ropeways) projects ==
=== Operational ===
As of 6 October 2025

List of operational tourist ropeways in India
System	Locale	Type	Length	Opened	Notes
Ambaji ropeway	Gabbar Hill, Gujarat	Monocabled gondola	363 m (1,191 ft)	1998	Opened windows.
Auli ropeway	Joshimath, Uttarakhand	Aerial tramway	4,150 m (13,620 ft)	1993	Glass windows.
Bambleshwari Temple ropeway	Dongargarh, Chhattisgarh	Bi-cabled gondola lift	387 m (1,270 ft)	2021	Glass windows.
Bhaleydhunga ropeway	Namchi district, Sikkim	Monocable gondola lift	3,500 m (11,500 ft)	2024	Glass windows.
Bhatta falls ropeway	Mussoorie, Uttarakhand	Monocable gondola lift	308 m (1,010 ft)	2019	
Bheraghat ropeway	Bhedaghat, Madhya Pradesh	Monocable gondola lift	600 m (2,000 ft)	2025	Glass windows.
Bhopal ropeway	Mahaveer Giri, Madhya Pradesh	Monocable gondola lift	600 m (2,000 ft)	2001	Glass windows.
Chandi devi ropeway	Haridwar, Uttarakhand	Monocable gondola lift	740 m (2,430 ft)	1997	Glass windows.
Chitrakoot ropeway	Chitrakoot, Madhya Pradesh	Monocable gondola lift	302 m (991 ft)	2020	Opened windows.
Darjeeling Ropeway	Darjeeling, West Bengal	Monocable gondola lift	5,000 m (16,000 ft) (Note: in two sections of 2,500 m each)	1968	Glass windows. India's first ropeway.
Dewas ropeway	Dewas, Madhya Pradesh	Monocable gondola lift	367 m (1,204 ft)	2017	Glass windows.
Dhandayuthapani Swamy Temple ropeway	Palani, Tamil Nadu	Monocable gondola lift	323 m (1,060 ft)	2004	Open windows.
Digha ropeway	Digha, West Bengal	Monocable gondola lift	194 m (636 ft)	2015	Glass windows.
Gangtok ropeway	Gangtok, Sikkim	Monocable gondola lift	1,600 m (5,200 ft)	2003	Glass windows. Plans to convert into urban ropeway.
Girnar ropeway	Mount Girnar, Gujarat	Monocable gondola lift	2,300 m (7,500 ft)	2020	Glass windows.
Gulmarg Gondola	Gulmarg, Jammu and Kashmir	Monocable gondola lift	4,631 m (15,194 ft) (Note: in two sections 2.4 km and 2.2 km)	1998	Ski resort gondola lift; Glass windows.
Gun Hill ropeway	Mussoorie, Uttarakhand	Aerial tramway	400 m (1,300 ft)	1971	Glass windows. India's first aerial tramway.
Hirakud Dam ropeway	Hirakud, Odisha	Monocable gondola lift	412 m (1,352 ft)	2019	Glass windows.
Jammu ropeway	Jammu, Jammu and Kashmir	Monocable gondola lift	1,660 m (5,450 ft)	2020	Glass windows.
Jakhu Temple ropeway	Shimla, Himachal Pradesh	Aerial tramway	600 m (2,000 ft)	2017	Glass windows.
Kailasagiri ropeway	Visakhapatnam, Andhra Pradesh	Monocable gondola lift	375 m (1,230 ft)	2004	Glass windows.
Kolkata Science City ropeway	Kolkata, West Bengal	Monocable gondola lift	400 m (1,300 ft)	1998	Opened windows.
Laxman Pahadi ropeway	Chitrakoot district, Uttar Pradesh	Monocable gondola lift	256 m (840 ft)	2019	Glass windows.
Maa Sharda ropeway	Maihar, Madhya Pradesh	Monocable gondola lift	760 m (2,490 ft)	2009	Glass windows.
Madan Negi ropeway	Sandana, Uttarakhand	Aerial trmaway	995 m (3,264 ft)	2009	Caged windows.
Marjing Polo Complex ropeway	Imphal, Manipur	Monocable gondola lift	600 m (2,000 ft)	2025	Glass windows.
Nainital ropeway	Nainital, Uttarakhand	Aerial tramway	705 m (2,313 ft)	1990	Glass windows.
Nandankanan ropeway	Bhubaneswar, Odisha	Monocable gondola lift	618 m (2,028 ft)	2023	Partial glass windows.
Parwanoo ropeway	Parwanoo Timber Trail, Himachal Pradesh	Aerial tramway	1,800 m (5,900 ft)	1988	Partially opened glass windows.
Pavagadh ropeway	Pavagadh Hill, Gujarat	Monocable gondola lift	774 m (2,539 ft)	1986	Glass windows.
Pushkar Savitri Mata Temple ropeway	Pushkar, Rajasthan	Monocable gondola lift	720 m (2,360 ft)	2015	Partially opened glass windows.
Rajgir ropeway	Rajgir, Bihar	Chairlift	333 m (1,093 ft)	1969	Single seater. India's first chairlift ropeway.
Saputara ropeway	Saputara, Gujarat	Monocable gondola lift	920 m (3,020 ft)	1991	Partially opened glass windows.
Shri Naina Devi ropeway	Sri Naina Devi, Himachal Pradesh	Monocable gondola lift	500 m (1,600 ft)	1997	Caged windows.
Srisailam ropeway	Srisailam, Andhra Pradesh	Monocable gondola lift	700 m (2,300 ft)	2005	Opened windows.
Sundha Mata Temple ropeway	Jalore district, Rajasthan	Monocable gondola lift	800 km (500 mi)	2006	Glass windows.
Surkanda Devi ropeway	Saklana range, Uttarakhand	Monocable gondola lift	502 m (1,647 ft)	2022	Glass windows.
Tara Tarini Mandir ropeway	Purushottampur, Odisha	Monocable gondola lift	333 m (1,093 ft)	2013	Glass windows.
Vaishno Devi Temple ropeway	Katra, Jammu and Kashmir	Aerial tramway	375 m (1,230 ft)	2018	Glass windows; Air conditioned
Mandar Hill ropeway	Banka, Bihar	Monocable gondola lift	377 m (1,238 ft)	2021	Glass windows
Jeen Mata ropeway	Rewasa, Sikar, Rajasthan	Monocable gondola lift	270 m (886 ft)	2024	Glass windows
Neemach Mata ropeway	Udaipur, Rajasthan	Monocable gondola lift	429.419 m (1,409 ft)	2024	Glass windows; ventilated cabins; automatic doors
Mansapurna Karni Mata Ropeway	Udaipur, Rajasthan	Monocable gondola lift	387 m (1,270 ft)	2008	Glass windows
Khole Ke Hanuman Ji ropeway	Jaipur, Rajasthan	Monocable gondola lift	436 m (1,430 ft)	2023	Glass windows; automatic doors
Dharamshala Skyway	Dharamshala, Himachal Pradesh	Monocable detachable gondola	1,775 m (5,823 ft)	2022	Connects Kotwali Bazaar to McLeod Ganj; capacity of 1,000 passengers per hour per direction.
Skyview Patnitop Ropeway	Sanget Valley–Patnitop, Udhampur, Jammu and Kashmir	Gondola lift	2,800 m (9,186 ft)	2019	Connects Sanget Valley and Patnitop; current operational status not independently confirmed.

=== Systems in development ===
As of 6 October 2025

List of under-development tourist ropeways in India
System	Locale	Type	Length	Year proposed	Construction began	Planned opening	Notes
Shillong peak ropeway	Shillong, Meghalaya	Monocable gondola lift	2,100 m (6,900 ft)	2022	2024	TBD	Glass windows.
Nandi hills ropeway	Chikkaballapur, Karnataka	Monocable gondola lift	2,930 m (9,610 ft)	2023	2026	2028	Glass windows.
Netaji Subhash Chandra Bose Dweep ropeway	Ross Is., Andaman and Nicobar	TBD	375 m (1,230 ft)	2023	TBD	TBD	
Dhosi Hill ropeway	Dhosi hill, Haryana	Bi-cabled gondola lift	880 m (2,890 ft)	2024	2025	TBD	Construction tender awarded (Feb 2025)
Panaji ropeway	Panaji, Goa	TBD	500 m (1,600 ft)	2025	TBD	TBD	
Golconda fort ropeway	Golconda, Telangana	TBD	1,500 m (4,900 ft)	2025	TBD	TBD	
Tiruvannamalai ropeway	Tiruvannamalai, Tamil Nadu	TBD		2025	TBD	TBD	Bid for DPR invited in Nov 2025.
Glenmorgan-Singara Power House ropeway	Ooty, Tamil Nadu	TBD		2025	TBD	TBD	Bid for DPR invited in Nov 2025.
Kurangani Top Station ropeway	Theni district, Tamil Nadu	TBD		2025	TBD	TBD	Bid for DPR invited in Nov 2025.
Thoranamalai Murugan Temple	Tenkasi district, Tamil Nadu	TBD		2025	TBD	TBD	Bid for DPR invited in Nov 2025.
Sathuragiri Hills ropeway-1	Virudhunagar district, Tamil Nadu	TBD		2025	TBD	TBD	Bid for DPR invited in Nov 2025.
Sathuragiri Hills ropeway-2	Virudhunagar district, Tamil Nadu	TBD		2025	TBD	TBD	Bid for DPR invited in Nov 2025.
Bijli Mahadev ropeway	Kullu, Himachal Pradesh	TBD		2025	TBD	TBD	Construction tender awarded (Feb 2025)
Mahakaleshwar Temple ropeway	Ujjain, Madhya Pradesh	TBD		2025	TBD	TBD	Construction tender awarded (Feb 2025)
Sangam ropeway	Prayagraj, Uttar Pradesh	TBD		2025	TBD	TBD	Construction tender awarded (Feb 2025)
Shankaracharya Temple ropeway	Srinagar, Jammu and Kashmir	TBD		2025	TBD	TBD	Construction tender awarded (Feb 2025)
Sonprayag-Kedarnath ropeway	Kedarnath, Uttarakhand	TBD		2025	TBD	TBD	Bid invited (Feb 2025)
Govindghat Hemkund Sahib ropeway	Hemkund Sahib, Uttarakhand	TBD		2025	TBD	TBD	Bid invited (Feb 2025)
Kamakhya Temple ropeway	Assam	TBD		2025	TBD	TBD	Bid invited (Feb 2025)
Tawang Monastery-PT Tso Lake ropeway	Tawang Monastery, Arunachal Pradesh	TBD		2025	TBD	TBD	Bid invited (Feb 2025)
Kathgodam-Hanuman Garhi Temple ropeway	Nainital, Uttarakhand	TBD		2025	TBD	TBD	Bid invited (Feb 2025)
Ramtek Gad Temple ropeway	Ramtek, Maharashtra	TBD		2025	TBD	TBD	Bid invited (Feb 2025)
Brahmagiri-Anjaneri ropeway	Anjaneri, Maharashtra	TBD		2025	TBD	TBD	Bid invited (Feb 2025)
Barabar Hills ropeway	Jehanabad district, Bihar	Monocable gondola lif		2015	2022	TBD	Connects Hathiyabor with Siddheshwar Nath Temple.
Brahmyoni Hill ropeway	Gaya Ji, Bihar	Monocable gondola lif		2016	2024	TBD	Government-sanctioned; cost ₹8.67 crore.
Dungeshwari Hill ropeway	Bodh Gaya, Bihar	Monocable gondola lif		2016	2024	TBD	Government-sanctioned project; estimated cost ₹16.76 crore
Pretshila Hill ropeway	Gaya Ji, Bihar	Monocable gondola lif		2016	2023	2027	Government-sanctioned tourist ropeway project; estimated cost ₹10.48 crore
Tikitoriya Mata Temple ropeway	Rehli, Sagar district, Madhya Pradesh		150 m (492 ft )	2022	2026	2027	Pilgrimage access to Tikitoriya Mata Temple; cost ₹21.89 crore.
Rohtasgarh Fort ropeway	Rohtas, Bihar	Monocable gondola lift	1,324 m (4,344 ft)	2012 (plan approved); ₹12.65 crore sanctioned 2015–16	2020 (Feb)	TBD	Connects Rohtas to Rohtasgarh Fort and Rohiteshwar Dham/Chaurasan Temple; ₹13.65 crore; 5 towers, 12 cabins × 4 seats. Collapsed during a load trial on 26 Dec 2025; contractor blacklisted, engineers suspended; being rebuilt on a revised IIT Patna–approved design .
Mundeshwari Hills ropeway	Bhagwanpur (Pawara Hill), Kaimur district, Bihar	Mono-cable pulsated system	400 m	2015 (₹7.35 crore sanctioned 2015–16)	TBD	TBD	Connects the base of Mundeshwari Hills to the Maa Mundeshwari Devi Temple; ₹7.35 crore; 500 PPH, 16 cabins of 4 seats; final forest clearance granted Dec 2025.
Kullu Dhalpur–Peej ropeway	Kullu Bus Stand (Sarwari/Dhalpur)–Peej Paragliding Point, Kullu, Himachal Pradesh	Aerial passenger ropeway	1,200 m (3,937 ft)	2024	TBD	TBD	Estimated cost ₹80 crore. Stage-I and forest clearances obtained; Stage-II approval under process. Construction expected to commence in December 2026.

As of 6 October 2025

List of abandoned tourist ropeways in India
System	Locale	Type	Length	Opened	Closed	Notes
Tawang Monastery ropeway	Tawang, Arunachal Pradesh	Bi-cabled gondola lift	1,184 m (3,885 ft)	2010	2024	Permanently closed.
Trikut Hill ropeway	Deoghar, Jharkhand	Monocable gondola lift	766 m (2,513 ft)	2009	2022	Permanently closed after fatal accident.
Samod Veer Hanuman Ji ropeway	Samod, Rajasthan	Monocable jig-back	365 m (1,198 ft)	2019	2019	Commercial operation suspended; reopening unconfirmed.

=== Operational ===
As of 6 October 2025

List of operational urban ropeways in India
System	Locale	Type	Lines	Stations	Length	Opened	Notes
Guwahati Ropeway	Umananda Island, Assam	Aerial tramway	1	3	1.82 km (1.13 mi)	24 August 2020	Glass windows; Swiss manufactured cabins.

=== Systems in development ===
As of 6 October 2025

List of under-development urban ropeways in India
System	Locale	Type	Length	Year proposed	Construction began	Planned opening	Notes
Kashi ropeway	Varanasi, Uttar Pradesh	Monocable gondola lift	3.75 km (2.33 mi)	2022	2023	2026	India's first urban gondola lift.
Aarey Metro Station-Film City ropeway	Mumbai, Maharashtra	TBD	3 km (1.9 mi)	2025	TBD	TBD	Possible extension to Sanjay Gandhi National Park.
Lengpui-Sairang-Aizawl ropeway	Aizawl, Mizoram	TBD	16.62 km (10.33 mi)	2025	TBD	TBD	

=== Material ropeways ===
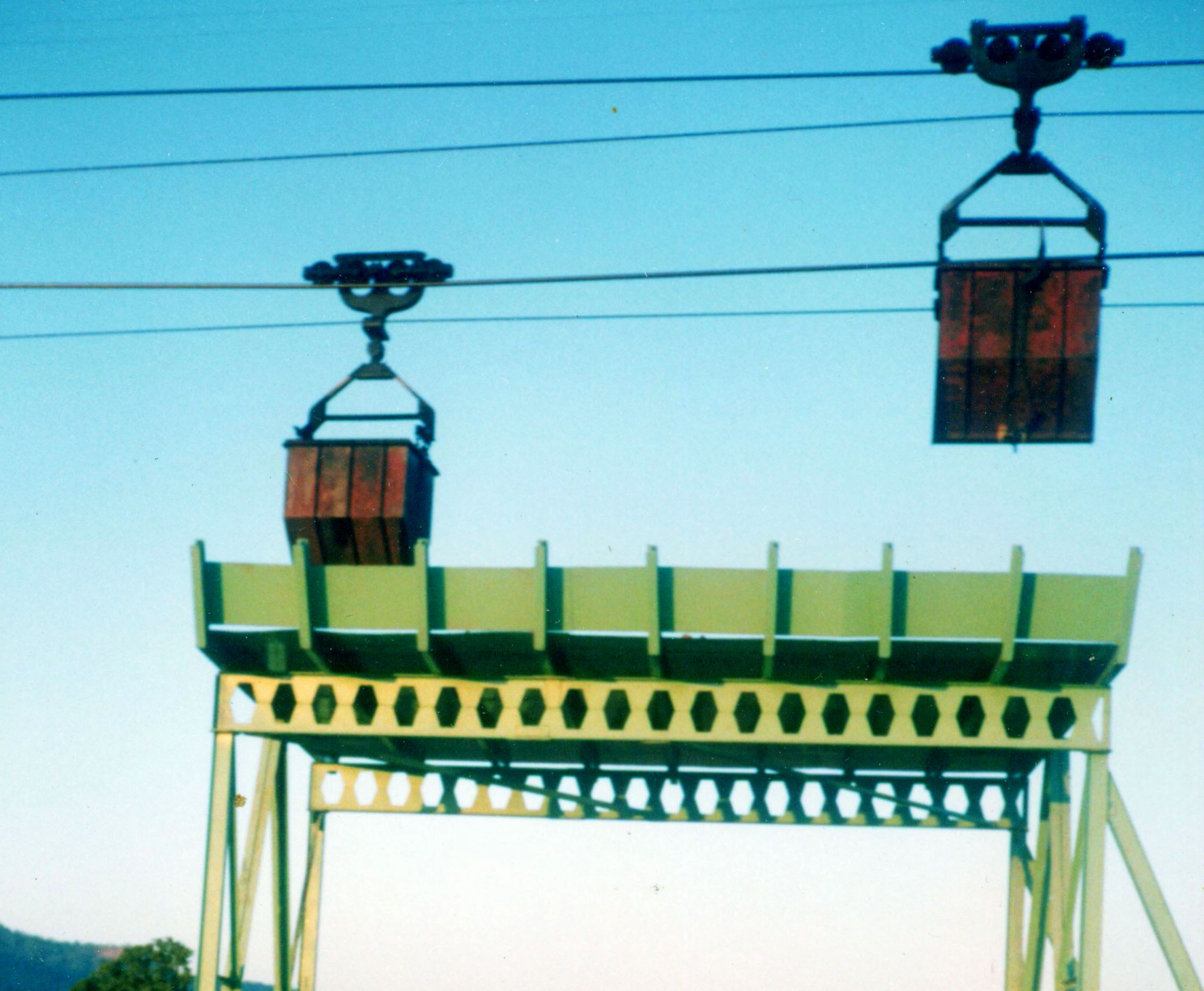
Coal handling ropeway near Pamulapalli in Telangana

=== Operational ===
As of 6 October 2025

List of operational material ropeways in India
System	Locale	Type	Material handled	Length	Opened	Notes
Pamulapalli coal ropeway	Manuguru, Telangana	Bi-cabled gondola	Coal	11.8 km (7.3 mi)	1971	India's first material ropeway. Designed and built by German company.

== Power projects ==
=== National Solar Mission ===
Project	Type	Location	Status	Notes
Bhadla Solar Park	Solar energy	Rajasthan	Completed	World's largest PV solar park
Pavagada Solar Park	Solar energy	Karnataka	Completed	World's third largest photovoltaic solar park
Omkareshwar Floating Solar Power Park	Solar energy	Madhya Pradesh	Completed	
Bhakra Nangal Floating Solar Power Park	Solar energy	Himachal Pradesh	Under construction	World's largest floating solar park
Dholera Solar Park	Solar energy	Gujarat	Under construction	World's largest photovoltaic solar park once completed
30,000 MW Khavda Solar Park	Solar energy and wind park	Gujarat	Under construction	When completed, it will be the world's biggest hybrid renewable energy park.
5,230 MW Integrated Renewable Energy Storage Project	Solar energy and wind park	Andhra Pradesh	Under construction	When completed, it will be the world's largest 5,230 MW Integrated Renewable Energy Storage Project with 50 GWh daily storage capacity by 2025 and 100 GWh by 2027
735 MW Nokh Solar Project	Solar energy	Rajasthan	Under construction	

=== Nuclear power plants ===
Nuclear power plants and reactors under construction in India
Power station	Operator	State	Type	Units	Total capacity (MW)	Status	Operation date
Chennai (Kalpakkam)	BHAVINI	Tamil Nadu	PFBR	500 × 1	500	Completed	2024
Kakrapar Unit 4	NPCIL	Gujarat	IPHWR-700	700 × 1	700	Completed	31 March 2024
Kaiga	NPCIL	Karnataka	IPHWR-700	700 × 2	1,400	Under construction	waiting concrete pour, 2026
Rajasthan Unit 7 and 8	NPCIL	Rajasthan	IPHWR-700	700 × 2	1,400	Under construction	2026
Kudankulam Unit 3, 4, 5 & 6	NPCIL	Tamil Nadu	VVER-1000	1000 × 4	4,000	Under construction	2025–2027
Jaitapur	NPCIL	Maharashtra	EPR	1650 × 6	9,900	Planned	
Gorakhpur (Fatehabad)	NPCIL	Haryana	IPHWR-700	700 × 2	1,400	Planned	2029
Kovvada	NPCIL	Andhra Pradesh	AP1000	1100 × 6	6,600	Approved	
Kavali	NPCIL	Andhra Pradesh	VVER	1000 x 6	6000	Approved	
Mahi Banswara	NPCIL	Rajasthan	IPHWR-700	700 × 4	2,800	Approved	2029
Chutka	NPCIL	Madhya Pradesh	IPHWR-700	700 × 2	1,400	Approved	
Chennai (Kalpakkam)	BHAVINI	Tamil Nadu	FBR	600 × 2	1,200	Approved	2035
Tarapur	NPCIL	Maharashtra	AHWR	300 × 1	300	Approved	2047

=== Nuclear power R&D projects ===
Project	Type	Location	Status	Notes
KAMINI (Kalpakkam Mini reactor)	Nuclear power plant	Kalpakkam	Completed	it is the world's first thorium-based experimental reactor.it produces 30 KW of thermal energy at full power.KAMINI is cooled and moderated by light water, and fueled with uranium-233 metal produced by the thorium fuel cycle harnessed by the neighbouring FBTR reactor.
PFBR	Nuclear power plant	Kalpakkam	Completed	it is the world's first commercial thorium-based reactor as well as Uranium.it produces 500 MW of thermal energy at full power.

=== Pumped storage hydropower projects ===
Project	Type	Location	Status	Notes
Polavaram PSHP (103 GW)	PSHP	Right side of Polavaram reservoir	Proposed	Once completed, it will be the largest PSHP station in the world with 103,000 MW generation capacity which can store 412 billion kWh in a year on a daily basis by consuming surplus solar PV power.
Jalaput PSHP (65 GW)	PSHP	Left side of Jalaput Reservoir	Proposed	It can store 260 billion kWh electricity in a year on a daily basis by consuming surplus solar PV power.

=== Other fuels ===
Project	Type	Location	Status	Notes
IOCL Panipat Ethanol Plant	Ethanol fuel	Panipat, Haryana	Completed	
HPCL Gonda Ethanol Plant	Ethanol fuel	Gonda, Uttar Pradesh	Under construction	Once completed, it will be Asia's largest ethanol plant.
Sangrur CBG Plant	Compressed biogas	Sangrur	Planned	Once completed, it will be Asia's largest compressed biogas plant.

== PRASHAD (pilgrimage places development) projects ==
Project	Location	Status	Notes
Hazratbal Shrine development project	Hazratbal, Jammu and Kashmir	Under construction	The shrine contains a relic, Moi-e-Muqqadas, believed to be the hair of the Islamic prophet Muhammad.
Devbhumi Dwarka Corridor	Devbhumi Dwarka, Gujarat	Under construction	Proposed project for the world's tallest statue of Lord Krishna
Jagannath Temple	Digha, West Bengal	Completed	A replica of Jagannath Temple, Puri is being built in Digha. It was inaugurated on 30 April 2025 (Akshay Tritiya). The cost of the project is more than Rs. 1 billion.
Kamakhya Temple Corridor	Guwahati, Assam	Under construction	
Redevelopment of Kedarpuri	Kedarnath, Uttarakhand	Under construction	
Somnath Temple Revamp	Gir Somnath, Gujarat	Under construction	Completed works include construction of Samudra Darshan Path, Exhibition Centre and Ahilyabai Temple Complex. Works that still remain include construction of Parvati Temple and various tourist facilities.
Vindhyachal Corridor	Mirzapur, Uttar Pradesh	Under construction	Various facilities such as parking zones, guest houses, shopping complexes, restrooms etc. are to be constructed around the Vindhyachal Temple.
Viraat Ramayan Mandir	East Champaran, Bihar	Under construction	To be the world's largest Hindu temple and world's biggest temple.
Vrindavan Chandrodaya Temple	Vrindavan, Uttar Pradesh	Under construction	World's tallest religious monument once completed
Ram Mandir	Uttar Pradesh	Completed	The temple has been built at the site believed by many Hindus to be Ram Janmabhoomi, the birthplace of Rama, a principal deity of Hinduism. The temple doors were opened for general public on 23 January 2024, after the prana pratishtha of the new Ram Lalla Murti. After the Ram Mandir Dhwajarohan ceremony, the construction work stands officially completed.
Shri Kashi Vishwanath Dham Corridor	Varanasi, Uttar Pradesh	Completed	
Mahakal Corridor	Ujjain, Madhya Pradesh	Completed	

== Railway projects ==
=== New rail-line projects(Greenfield Projects) ===
Project	Location	Status	Description
Mumbai–Indore rail line	Mumbai-Indore	Under-construction	
Delhi–Jhansi 3rd rail line	Jhansi-New Delhi	Partially work completed and open for traffic.	
Delhi–Mumbai new rail line	Mumbai-New Delhi	Under-construction	
USBRL	Srinagar-New Delhi	Completed	
Rishikesh–Karnaprayag line	Uttarkhand	Under-construction	
Bhanupli–Leh line	Leh-New Delhi	Under-construction	
Roorkee–Deoband new rail line	Roorkee-Deoband	Completed	
Jalna-Jalgaon new rail line	Jalna-Jalgaon	Under-construction	
Rishikesh Char dham rail line	Rishikesh	Under-construction	
Koderma-Ranchi	Ranchi	Completed	
Bikramshila – Katareah rail line	Jharkhand	Under-construction	
Sivok–Rangpo line	Sevok-Rangpo	Under-construction	
Dhansiri-Zubza rail line	Nagaland	Dhansiri-Molvom section operational. Molvom-Zubza Under-construction.	
Panvel-Karjat rail line	Panvel-Karjat	Under-construction	
Mysuru-Kushalnagar rail line	Karnataka	Under-construction	

=== Mission-Raftar projects(Brownfield Projects) ===
Project	Location	Status	Description
Mumbai–Chennai	Mumbai-Chennai	Under-construction	
Delhi–Chennai	Chennai-New Delhi	Under-construction	
Delhi–Mumbai	Mumbai-New Delhi	Under-construction	
Delhi–Howrah	Delhi-Howrah	Under-construction	
Howrah-Mumbai	Howrah-Mumbai	Under-construction	

=== Higher-speed rail projects ===
Train number	Project	Photo	Location	Status	Description
Mumbai–Ahmedabad high-speed rail corridor	High-speed rail line		Gujarat and Maharashtra	Under construction	India's first high-speed rail line
Silver Line (K-Rail)	High-speed rail		Thiruvananthapuram and Kasaragod	Planned	The Silver Line is a proposed higher-speed rail line in India that would connect Thiruvananthapuram, the capital city, and Kasaragod of Kerala state.

== Recreational projects ==
Project	Image	Location	Status	Notes
Bharat Vandana Park		New Delhi	Under construction	
Statue of Oneness		Omkareshwar	Completed	108 feet high 'Statue of Oneness' of Adi Shankaracharya on Mandhata mountain at Omkareshwar.
Statue of Equality		Maharashtra	Under construction	The Statue of Equality, also referred to as the Dr. Babasaheb Ambedkar Memorial, is located in Mumbai. It will be the world's third tallest statue and is expected to be completed by 2026. 50% work of this project was completed as of December 2023.
Yuge Yugeen Bharat National Museum		Delhi	Planned	It will be the world's largest museum and expected to be completed by 2026.
Statue of Unity		Gujarat	Completed	World's tallest statue, with a height of 182 meters
Statue of Belief		Rajasthan	Completed	World's 4th tallest statue, with a height of 106 meters
Statue of Equality		Hyderabad	Completed	The Statue of Equality, also referred to as Ramanuja statue, is a statue of the 11th-century Vaishnavaite Saint Bhagavad Ramanuja, located at the premises of Chinna Jeeyar Trust at Muchintal, Bhagyanagar.
Statue of Prosperity		Bangalore	Completed	Statue of Prosperity entered the World Book of Records as the tallest bronze statue of a city architect.
Statue of Social Justice		Vijaywada	Completed	
Chhatrapati Shivaji Maharaj Smarak		Mumbai		A monument under construction dedicated to Chhatrapati Shivaji Maharaj
Dr BR Ambedkar statue		Hyderabad	Completed	

== Reservoir and irrigation projects ==
=== Dams ===
Project	Type	Location	Status	Notes
Polavaram Dam	Irrigation and Road	Andhra Pradesh	Under construction	
Nallamalasagar Reservoir	Irrigation and Road	Andhra Pradesh	Under construction	The Poola Subbaiah Irrigation Project is located in Markapur, Prakasam district in Andhra Pradesh, India. When completed, the project will provide irrigational facilities to 459,000 acres and drinking water to 1.5 million people in 29 mandals of fluoride and drought affected areas in Prakasam district, Nellore district and Kadapa district by diverting 43.5 TMC of floodwater from the Krishna River from the foreshore of Srisailam Reservoir near Kollamvagu and proposed to store in Nallamalasagar Reservoir.
Pakal Dul Dam	Hydropower	Jammu and Kashmir	Under construction	The Pakal Dul Dam is an under construction concrete-face rock-fill dam on the Marusudar river, a tributary of the Chenab River, in Kishtwar district of the Indian Jammu and Kashmir. The primary purpose of the dam is hydroelectric power generation. The project will be implemented by M/s. Chenab Valley Power Projects Private Limited (M/s. CVPPL) a Public Sector Enterprise.
Kwar hydro project	Hydropower	Jammu and Kashmir	Under construction	T

=== Pumped Storage Projects ===
Project	Type	Company	Location	Status	Notes
Pinnapuram PSP	PSP	Greenko	Andhra Pradesh	Under construction	
Polavaram PSP	PSP	NREDCAP	Andhra Pradesh	Under construction	
Patgaon PSP	PSP	Adani Green	Maharashtra	Under construction	
Ramapur Gurar Standalone PSP	PSP	Greenko	Uttar Pradesh	Proposed	
Gadhwani PSP	PSP	Gandhwani Energy	Surajpur, Chhattisgarh	Proposed	
Gandikota PSP	PSP	NREDCAP	Surajpur, Chhattisgarh	Proposed	
Rana Pratap Sagar PSP	PSP	Semaliya Energy	Semaliya, Rajasthan	Proposed	
Surguja PSP	PSP	Sterlite Energy	Surguja, Chhattisgarh	Proposed	
Sonbhadra PSP	PSP	JSW Energy	Uttar Pradesh	Proposed	
Neemuch PSP	PSP	Greenko	Madhya Pradesh	Under construction	
Bahalpur PSP	PSP	Greenko	West Bengal	Proposed	
Bhavali PSP	PSP	Greenko	Maharashtra	Proposed	
Coal India PSP	PSP	NHPC	Madhya Pradesh, Jharkhand	Proposed	
Darzo Lui PSP	PSP	SJVN	Darzo Nallah, Mizoram	Approved	
Warasgaon PSP	PSP	Adani Green	Maharashtra	Proposed	
Malshej Ghat PSP	PSP	Adani Green	Maharashtra	Proposed	
Tarali PSP	PSP	Adani Green	Maharashtra	Proposed	

=== Inter-river link projects ===
Key

- PFR- Pre Feasibility Report
- FR- Feasibility Report
- DPR- Detailed Project Report

Names of Inter Basin Water Transfer Links, the States involved, name of rivers and status of Feasibility Reports/Detailed Project Report
S. No.		Name	Rivers	States concerned	Present status
Peninsular Component
1		Mahanadi (Manibhadra) -Godavari (Dowlaiswaram) link	Mahanadi & Godavari	Odisha, Maharashtra, Andhra Pradesh (AP), Madhya Pradesh (MP), Telangana, Jharkhand, Karnataka, Chhattisgarh	FR Completed
2		Godavari (Inchampalli) - Krishna (Pulichintala) link	Godavari & Krishna	Odisha, Maharashtra, AP, MP, Telangana, Karnataka, Chhattisgarh& Maharashtra	FR Completed
3		Godavari (Inchampalli) - Krishna (Nagarjunasagar) link	Godavari & Krishna	Odisha, Maharashtra, Madhya Pradesh, Andhra Pradesh, Karnataka &Chhattisgarh	FR & Draft DPR Completed
4		Godavari (Polavaram) - Krishna (Vijayawada) link	Godavari & Krishna	Andhra Pradesh	FR Completed
5		Krishna (Almatti) – Pennar link	Krishna & Pennar	Maharashtra, Andhra Pradesh, Karnataka &Telangana	FR Completed
6		Krishna (Srisailam) – Pennar link	Krishna & Pennar	Andhra Pradesh	FR Completed
7		Krishna (Nagarjunasagar) - Pennar (Somasila ) link	Krishna & Pennar	Andhra Pradesh	FR & Draft DPR Completed
8		Pennar (Somasila) - Cauvery (Grand Anicut) link	Pennar & Cauvery	Andhra Pradesh, Karnataka, Tamil Nadu, Kerala & Puducherry	FR & Draft DPR Completed
9		Cauvery (Kattalai) - Vaigai -Gundar link Project (as an extension of Godavari-Cauvery Interlinking project)	Cauvery, Vaigai & Gundar	Karnataka, Tamil Nadu, Kerala & Puducherry	DPR Completed. Foundation stone laid and construction started
10		Ken-Betwa link	Ken & Betwa	Uttar Pradesh & Madhya Pradesh	FR & DPR (Ph-I, II & Comprehensive) Completed
11	(i)	Parbati -Kalisindh- Chambal link	Parbati, Kalisindh & Chambal	Madhya Pradesh, Rajasthan & Uttar Pradesh (UP requested to be consulted during consensus building)	FR Completed
11	(ii)	Parbati-Kuno-Sindh link	Parbati, Kuno and Sindh	MP and Rajasthan	PFR completed (Note: Integration of Eastern Rajasthan Canal Project of Rajasthan and Parbati – Kalisindh – Chambal link.)
12		Par-Tapi-Narmada link	Par, Tapi & Narmada	Maharashtra & Gujarat	DPR Completed
13		Damanganga - Pinjal link	Damanganga & Pinjal	Maharashtra & Gujarat	DPR Completed
14		Bedti - Varda link	Bedti & Varada	Maharashtra, Andhra Pradesh & Karnataka	PFR Completed
15		Netravati – Hemavati link	Netravati & Hemavati	Karnataka, Tamil Nadu & Kerala	PFR Completed
16		Pamba - Achankovil - Vaippar link	Pamba, Achankovil & Vaippar	Kerala & Tamil Nadu,	Project Dropped.
Himalayan Component
1		Manas-Sankosh-Tista-Ganga (M-S-T-G) link	Manas, Sankosh, Teesta and Ganga	Assam, West Bengal, Bihar & Bhutan	FR completed
2		Kosi-Ghaghra link	Kosi & Ghaghara	Bihar, Uttar Pradesh & Nepal	PFR completed
3		Gandak-Ganga link	Gandak & Ganga	-do-	FR completed (Indian portion)
4		Ghaghra-Yamuna link	Ghaghra & Yamuna	-do-	FR completed (Indian portion)
5		Sarda-Yamuna link	Sarda & Yamuna	Bihar, Uttar Pradesh, Haryana, Rajasthan, Uttarakhand & Nepal	FR completed (Indian portion)
6		Yamuna-Rajasthan link	Yamuna & Sukri	Uttar Pradesh, Gujarat, Haryana & Rajasthan	Draft FR completed
7		Rajasthan-Sabarmati link	Sabarmati	-do-	FR completed
8		Chunar-Sone Barrage link	Ganga & Sone	Bihar & Uttar Pradesh	Draft FR completed
9		Sone Dam – Southern Tributaries of Ganga link	Sone & Badua	Bihar & Jharkhand	PFR completed
10		Ganga (Farakka)-Damodar-Subernarekha link	Ganga, Damodar & Subernarekha	West Bengal, Odisha & Jharkhand	Draft FR completed
11		Subernarekha-Mahanadi link	Subernarekha & Mahanadi	West Bengal & Odisha	FR completed
12		Kosi-Mechi link	Kosi & Mechi	Bihar, West Bengal & Nepal	PFR completed
13		Ganga (Farakka)-Sunderbans link	Ganga & Ichhamati	West Bengal	FR completed
14		Jogighopa-Tista-Farakka link (Alternative to M-S-T-G)	Manas, Teesta & Ganga	-do-	Dropped

=== Coastal reservoirs ===
Project	Type	Location	Project map	Status	Notes
Kalpasar Project	Coastal reservoir, tidal power and road	Gulf of Khambhat, Gujarat		Feasible studies underway	It is a huge freshwater coastal reservoir for drinking, Irrigation, and Industrial purposes. Also, a 10-lane road will be created on the dam which will reduce the distance between South Gujarat and Saurashtra. Once completed it will be the world's largest freshwater lake in a marine environment.
Harnessing flood waters of Ganga, Brahmaputra, Meghana, etc. rivers joining the Sea by a massive coastal reservoir with associated embankment canals	Coastal reservoir, pumped storage hydroelectric and ultra-deep mega harbor	Bay of Bengal, India and Bangladesh		Proposed	It is a gigantic freshwater coastal reservoir for drinking, 300 million acres of irrigation using 1200 billion cubic meters (bcm) water, an ultra-deep mega harbor, energy storage, rejuvenation of the over-exploited rivers of India, and industrial purposes.
Harnessing flood waters of Godavari River joining the sea by a coastal reservoir with associated lift canals	Coastal reservoir, pumped storage hydroelectric and ultra-deep mega harbor	Bay of Bengal, Andhra Pradesh		Proposed	It is a huge freshwater coastal reservoir of 29 bcm storage capacity to harness 50 bcm of Godavari river for drinking, irrigation in the Rayalaseema region of Andhra Pradesh and Tamil Nadu, an ultra-deep mega harbor, energy storage, and industrial purposes.

== Sagarmala (ports and waterways) projects ==
=== Sea ports ===
Location	State	Status
Belekeri Port	Karnataka	Under construction
Karwar Port	Karnataka	Under construction
Kannur Port	Kerala	Planned
New Bedi Port	Gujarat	Partially constructed
Sagar Port	West Bengal	Under construction
Astaranga Port	Odisha	DPR under preparation
Mahanadi Riverine Port	Odisha	DPR under preparation
Paradip Outer Harbour	Odisha	DPR under preparation
Sirkazhi	Tamil Nadu	Techno Economic Feasibility Report (TEFR) prepared
Kanniyakumari Port	Tamil Nadu	Major transhipment port at Kanyakumari. SPV formed for the purpose in March, 2019.
Dugarajapatnam Port	Andhra Pradesh	Dugarajapatnam Port is a proposed seaport in Tirupati district of Andhra Pradesh. Construction was expected to start in 2020 and end in 2023.
Galathea Bay Transhipment Port	Great Nicobar	DPR has been completed
Machilipatnam Port	Andhra Pradesh	Under construction
Bhavanapadu Port	Andhra Pradesh	Under construction
Kalingapatnam Port	Andhra Pradesh	DPR completed
Ramayapatnam Port	Andhra Pradesh	Under construction
Meghavaram Port	Andhra Pradesh	DPR completed
Nargol Port	Gujarat	Gujarat Government invited the bids
Vadhavan Port	Maharashtra	Under construction

=== Private ports ===
There are also private ports under construction/reopening.

Location	State	Status
Angré Port	Jaigad, Maharashtra	
Agardanda Shipyard & Terminal	Agardanda, Maharashtra	Agardanda Terminal is a container terminal acquired by Adani Group which was previously a shipyard.
Bhavnagar CNG Terminal	Gujarat	
Chhara LNG Terminal	Gujarat	
Dighi Port	Dighi, Maharashtra	
Rohini Yard	Rohini, Maharashtra	
Simar port	Gujarat	Completion target 2024
JSW Salav Port	Salav, Maharashtra	
Karanja Port	Navi Mumbai, Maharashtra	
JSW Keni Port	Karnataka	On 17 November 2023, Construction started at the port in Keni, near Ankola, would be designed to handle 30 million tonnes of cargo per annum.
JSW Nangaon Port	Maharashtra	Bidding underway
JSW Murbe Port	Maharashtra	Bidding underway
JSW Jatadhar Port	Orissa	Planned
Pavinakurve port	Karnataka	Pavinakurve will have capacity to handle 14 mt of cargo in the initial phase.
Konkan LNG Terminal	Dabhol, Maharashtra	
Tajpur Port	West Bengal	DPR under preparation
Tadadi Port	Karnataka	DPR under preparation
Tuna Port	Gujarat	Adani Group started the port in 2015 as Dry cargo terminal for coal but now expanding to Container terminal
Kakinada Gateway Port	Andhra Pradesh	Under construction
Vizhinjam International Seaport	Kerala	Partially operational

=== National waterways ===
Project	Type	Location	Status	Notes
National Waterway 4	Waterway	Telangana, Andhra Pradesh, Tamil Nadu and Puducherry	Under construction	National Waterway 4 (NW-4) is a 1,095 kilometres (680 mi) long waterway in India. It has been declared as an Indian National Waterway and is currently under development. It connects the Indian states of Telangana, Andhra Pradesh, Tamil Nadu, and the union territory of Puducherry. The NW-4 runs along the Coromandal Coast through Kakinada, Eluru, Commanur, Buckingham Canals and also through part of Krishna and Godavari rivers in South India. It was declared a National Waterway on 24 November 2008 under the Provisions of National Waterways Bill, 2006.
National Waterway 1	Waterway	Uttar Pradesh, Bihar, West Bengal	Under construction	The Ganga-Bhagirathi-Hooghly river system is located in India and runs from Prayagraj in Uttar Pradesh to Haldia in West Bengal via Patna and Bhagalpur in Bihar across the Ganges river. It is 1,620 km (1,010 mi) long, making it the longest waterway in India.

=== Ferry ===
Project	Location	Status	Notes
Kochi Water Metro	Kochi	Completed	Kochi Water Metro is an integrated ferry transport project in Greater Kochi region proposed by Kochi Metro Rail Limited.

== Science and technology projects ==
=== Aerospace Research and Development projects ===
==== Commercial aircraft ====
Project name	Type	Image	Status	Description
NAL Saras	aircraft		Completed	The NAL Saras (Sanskrit: "Crane") is the first Indian multi-purpose civilian aircraft in the light transport aircraft category.
NAL Saras (Mark 2)	aircraft		Under construction	NAL is also engaged in development of Saras Mk2, a 19-seater version of the airliner. Government has given clearance and fund requirements to NAL for development of same.
HAL/NAL Regional Transport Aircraft	aircraft		Under construction	Being designed by India's National Aerospace Laboratories (NAL) and to be manufactured by Hindustan Aeronautics Limited (HAL). The aircraft is planned to be a turboprop or a jet with a capacity of 80–100 passengers. Its basic version will have 80–90 seats (RTA-70) and the cost of the airliner will be 20 percent lower compared to its global competitors.
GTRE GTX-35VS Kaveri	Jet engine		Partially completed	Kaveri dry engine variant is about to get delivery by 2026.

==== Commercial Helicoptes ====
Project	Type	Location	Status	Notes
HAL Tumkuru	Helicopter factory	Tumakuru	Completed	The new Helicopter factory coming up in a 615 acres green field campus that would be fully self-sufficient for manufacturing full range of helicopters from 3 ton to 12 tons category and shall consist of state of the art manufacturing, structural assembly, final assembly-line facilities, heli-runway, aerodrome, residential township for the staff, recreational facilities, a well-equipped training and development centre, etc.
Aircraft Manufacturing Division, HAL Nashik	Aircraft factory	Nashik	Under construction	HAL has a capacity to build 16 LCA Mk-1As every year in Bengaluru, and the Nashik line will help the firm ramp up production to a total of 24 jets. Nashik, India's wine capital, is set to emerge as the next hub for aircraft manufacturing in the country, with Bengaluru-based state-owned plane maker Hindustan Aeronautics Limited (HAL) preparing to activate new production lines for the indigenous light combat aircraft (LCA) Mk-1A and Hindustan Turbo Trainer-40 (HTT-40) planes to meet the Indian Air Force's growing requirements for fighter jets.

==== Spaceports ====
Spaceport name	State	Status	Year
Kulasekarapattinam spaceport	Thoothukudi, Tamil Nadu	Under Construction	2025

==== Rockets ====
Launch vehicle	Destination	Outcome	Year
SSLV	Low Earth orbit	Successful	2022
RLV-LEX	Low Earth orbit	Successful	2023
Next Generation Launch Vehicle (NGLV)	Geostationary transfer orbit	Planned	2027
HSTDV	Low Earth orbit	Successful	2019
Air breathing rocket	Low Earth orbit	Successful	2024

==== Satellite-based navigation ====
Project name	Status	Year	Notes
NaVIC	Operational	2020	India's indigenously made autonomous regional satellite navigation system that provides accurate real-time positioning and timing services
GAGAN	Operational	2021	India's indigenously made regional satellite-based augmentation system (SBAS)

=== Railway Rakes ===
Project name	Type	Image	Status	Description
Vande Sleeper (Train 20)	Semi high speed rail		Completed	The Vande Bharat sleeper trainset, formerly known as Train-20, is a semi-high-speed, long-distance electric multiple unit (EMU) train, designed to replace the Rajdhani Express.
Vande Bharat (Train 18)	Semi high speed rail		Completed	The Vande Bharat Express, previously known as Train 18, is a semi-high-speed, electric multiple unit train operated by the Indian Railways on 66 routes as of September 2024. 15 new rakes has comeout of ICF as of 8 September 2024.
Vande Cargo	Semi high speed rail		Completed	The Vande Cargo is a based on Vande Bharat platform
Vande Metro	Semi-highspeed rail		Completed	RCF Kapurthala built the first model of Vande Metro to be launched on August 15
Amrit Bharat	Semi high speed rail		Completed	
Namo Bharat	Semi high speed rail		Completed	10 trainsets has been delivered till now
LNG Train	Semi high speed rail		Completed	World's first LNG Train
Hydrogen train	Semi high speed rail		Completed	India has unveiled most powerful 1200 hp hydrogen train
B 28 Bullet train	High speed rail		under construction	India's own indigenous bullet train with speed upto 280km/hr
B 35 Bullet train	High speed rail		planned	India's own indigenous bullet train with speed upto 350km/hr.

=== Supercomputing ===
Project	Rank	Type	Company
AIRAWAT AI	75th	PARAM supercomputer	Netweb Technologies

=== Laboratories, observatories and related projects ===
Project	Type	Location	Status	Notes
QpiAI-Indus	quantum computer	Bangalore	Completed	It is a 25 superconducting qubits quantum computer developed by the Bangalore based startup company QpiAI.
3.6m Devasthal Optical Telescope	Telescope astronomy	nationwide	Completed	3.6m DOT is currently the largest reflecting telescope in Asia. DOT is a clear-aperture Ritchey–Chrétien telescope built by Aryabhatta Research Institute of Observational Sciences (ARIES) and is located at the Devasthal Observatory site near Nainital, Kumaon, India. ARIES operates another 1.3m telescope at the same location.
Astrosat	Telescope astronomy	nationwide	Completed	India's first dedicated multi-wavelength space telescope, Astrosat is a multi-wavelength astronomy mission on an IRS-class satellite into a near-Earth, equatorial orbit. The five instruments on board cover the visible (320–530 nm), near UV (180–300 nm), far UV (130–180 nm), soft X-ray (0.3–8 keV and 2–10 keV) and hard X-ray (3–80 keV and 10–150 keV) regions of the electromagnetic spectrum.
BharatNet	Broadband connectivity	nationwide	Under construction	Government of India wants to establish, manage, and operate the National Optical Fibre Network to provide a minimum of 100 Mbit/s broadband connectivity to all 250,000-gram panchayats in the country, covering nearly 625,000 villages, by improving the middle layer of nationwide broadband Internet in India.
E-bomb	Electromagnetic pulse	nationwide	Confidential	DRDO is developing its own EMP based bomb
India-based Neutrino Observatory (INO)	Particle physics research project	nationwide	Stalled	One of the biggest experimental particle physics projects undertaken in India
Iron-ion battery	battery research project	nationwide	Completed	India Develops the World's First Iron-ion Battery in IIT Madras in 2019
NAVIC	Navigation system	nationwide	Completed	NavIC, is an autonomous regional satellite navigation system that provides accurate real-time positioning and timing services.
MACE	Telescope	nationwide	Completed	Major Atmospheric Cerenkov Experiment Telescope (MACE) is an Imaging Atmospheric Cerenkov telescope (IACT) located near Hanle, Ladakh, India. It is the highest (in altitude) and second largest Cerenkov telescope in the world. It was built by Electronics Corporation of India, Hyderabad. The telescope is named after the Soviet scientist Pavel Cherenkov.
5Gi	Telecommunications	nationwide	Completed	Specifications from TSDSI STD T3.9036 to TSDSI STD T3.9038 defines 5Gi standard
Bharat 6G	Telecommunications	nationwide	Under construction	India has secured more than 200 global patents for 6G technology.
Solar Ultraviolet Imaging Telescope (SUIT)	Telescope astronomy	nationwide	Completed	The Solar Ultraviolet Imaging Telescope (SUIT) on India's Aditya-L1 spacecraft captured the first full-disk images of the Sun in near ultraviolet light in December 2023. The images were taken in the 200–400 nanometer (nm) wavelength range using scientific filters. The images show sunspots, plage, and quiet Sun regions, and provide scientists with insights into the Sun's photosphere and chromosphere.
Quantum network	Telecommunications	nationwide	Completed	Researchers from the Indian Institute of Technology (IIT) Delhi have successfully demonstrated secure quantum communication over a distance of 380 kilometers in standard telecom fiber.
Cold Fusion Nuclear Energy	Nuclear power	nationwide	Completed	HYLENR Technologies demonstrated world's first cold fusion technology, its Low Energy Nuclear Reactor (LENR) has successfully produced 1.5 times the output energy from heat input.
Earth System Science Organisation scientific deep drilling	geography	Koyna	Proposed	India will drill 6 km down into the earth by Borehole Geophysics Research Laboratory (BGRL)

=== Digital public goods ===
Logo	Project	Type	Location	Status	Notes
	Open Network for Digital Commerce	E-commerce	nationwide	Completed	A community-led network that aims to create an open, inclusive and competitive marketplace
	Bharat eMart	E-commerce	nationwide	Completed	Bharat EMart is an e-commerce marketplace created by India Post. The portal provides logistics support to small traders in India, which will increase their businesses and employment opportunities.
	Government e Marketplace	E-commerce	nationwide	Completed	The Government e Marketplace is an online platform for public procurement in India. The objective is to create an open and transparent procurement platform for government buyers.
	DigiYatra	Facial recognition system	nationwide	Completed	DigiYatra is a decentralised mobile-based ID storage platform where air travellers can save their IDs and travel documents.

=== Vaccines ===
Project	Disease	Developed by	Status	Notes
ZyCoV-D vaccine	COVID-19 (virus SARS-CoV-2)	Cadila Healthcare / Biotechnology Industry Research Assistance Council (BIRAC)	Completed	World's first DNA based COVID-19 vaccine
Covaxin vaccine	COVID-19 (virus SARS-CoV-2)	Bharat Biotech/Indian Council of Medical Research	Completed	Bharat Biotech's Covaxin (BBV152) is an inactivated COVID-19 vaccine that uses adjuvant Alhydroxiquim-II to boost immune response longer-lasting immunity. The Indian Council of Medical Research and Bharat Biotech created the Covaxin (BBV152) vaccine. ICMR received ₹1717.4 million in royalty from Covaxin sales.
INCOVACC	COVID-19 (virus SARS-CoV-2)	Bharat Biotech/Indian Council of Medical Research	Completed	iNCOVACC (codenamed BBV154) is an intranasal COVID-19 vaccine candidate developed by Bharat Biotech.

== Setu Bharatam (bridges) projects ==
Project	Type	Image	Location	Status	Notes
Middle Straight–Baratang Bridge	Pier bridge		Andaman and Nicobar Islands	Under construction	The bridge will connect South Andaman with Baratang, Middle Andaman.
Mahalaxmi ROB	Cable stayed bridge		Mahalaxmi, Mumbai	Under construction	This is a rail over bridge near Mumbai central rail yard
Beas Suspension bridge	cable-stayed bridge		Punjab	Under construction	Asia's longest 1,300-mtrs cable-stayed bridge over the Beas river
Mir Alam Tank cable bridge	cable-stayed bridge		Hyderabad	Under construction	
Guwahati-North Guwahati Bridge	Cable-stayed bridge		Assam	Completed	The Guwahati-North Guwahati bridge is an 8.4 km bridge across Brahmaputra Bridge
Noney Bridge	pier bridge		Manipur	Completed	World's tallest railway pier bridge when completed
Prayagraj 6 lane Bridge	cable stayed bridge		Uttar Pradesh	Under construction	
Ravindra Bhavan-Mormugao Port Bridge	tri-cable stayed bridge		Goa	Completed	World's first tri-cable-stayed bridge and India's first curved bridge
Tiger Valley Bridge	Cable-stayed bridge		Khopoli, Maharashtra	Completed	
Kacchi Dargah–Bidupur Bridge	Cable-stayed bridge		Bihar	Partially completed up to Raghopur Diyara	Kacchi Dargah–Bidupur Bridge is six lanes of roadway and pedestrian pathways each side that is currently under construction. It will span the river Ganges, connecting Kacchi Dargah in Patna and Bidupur in Hajipur in the Indian state of Bihar.
Tapola Cable Stayed Bridge	Cable-stayed bridge		Maharashtra	Partially	
Krishna River Suspension Bridge	suspension cum cable stayed bridge		Andhra Pradesh	Under construction	India's longest and hybrid of suspension and cable stayed bridge
Mokama Ganga Bridge (Aunta-Simaria) NH-31	Extradosed bridge		Bihar	Completed	With the vision of excellent connectivity in Bihar, the project for Aunta-Simaria including Ganga Bridge with approach Roads on NH-31 is in progress.
Sigandur Bridge	Extradosed bridge		Karnataka	Completed	
Chenab Bridge	Deck arch bridge		Jammu and Kashmir	Completed	World's highest railway bridge, inaugurated on 13 August 2022
Janaki Setu	Cable-stayed bridge		Uttarakhand	Completed	Suspension bridge in Rishikesh
Sudarshan Setu	Cable-stayed bridge		Gujarat	Completed	New four-lane signature bridge with 900m long central cable stayed module connecting Okha and Beyt Dwarka including construction of approaches on new national highway no NH-51 in Gujarat
Anji Khad Bridge	Cable-stayed bridge	ANJI KHAD BRIDGE PHOTO BY -ATANU	Jammu and Kashmir	Completed	World's highest cable-stayed railway bridge
Atal Pedestrian Bridge	Truss bridge		Gujarat	Completed	The bridge connects Okha town and Bet Dwarka–an island.
Ramjhula	Cable-stayed bridge		Nagpur	Completed	Ram Jhula consists of two parallel cable-stayed railway over-bridges in Nagpur, India. The 606.74 metres (1,990.6 ft) long bridge crosses the railway tracks north of Nagpur Junction railway station.
New Zuari Bridge	Cable-stayed bridge		Goa	Completed	13.635 km Zuari Bridge project (NH-66) by NHAI in Goa is an under construction 6–8 lane access-controlled highway with a route alignment connecting Bambolim and Verna. It is being constructed by Dilip Buildcon Limited
Chicham Bridge	suspension bridge		Himachal Pradesh	Completed	One of Asia's highest bridge hanging above 1000 ft deep gorge
Ambhora Bridge	Cable-stayed bridge		Maharashtra	Completed	India's first cable-stayed bridge with sky gallery
Barddhaman Hanging Railway Bridge	Cable-stayed bridge		West Bengal	Completed	India's first cable-stayed bridge on above railway line
Karimnagar Cable Bridge	Cable-stayed bridge	Cablebridge	Telangana	Completed	The first cable-stayed bridge to be constructed across the river Manair at an estimated cost of Rs 1.87 billion on the outskirts of Karimnagar town and become an icon of the Telangana state in the year 2018.
Raja Bhoj Setu	Cable-stayed bridge		Bhopal, Madhya Pradesh	Completed	
Hatania Doania Bridge	Cable-stayed bridge		Namkhana, West Bengal	Completed	
Siyom Bridge	Deck arch bridge		Arunachal Pradesh	Completed	Located on the Along-Yinkiong Road, the Siyom bridge will greatly enhance the speed of troop deployment, as well as the transportation of heavy equipment and mechanized vehicles to forward areas in the Upper Siang district, Tuting, and Yinkiong regions along the Line of Actual Control (LAC).The construction of the Siyom bridge and the other infrastructure projects completed by the BRO will greatly benefit the Indian military's ability to quickly and efficiently deploy troops and equipment to the border regions.
Wahrew Bridge	Through arch bridge		Meghalaya	Completed	India's longest 169-metre through arch bridge, the Wahrew Bridge connects Bholaganj and Sohbar to Nongjri in East Khasi Hills district and runs over Wahrew river .

== Sports infrastructure projects ==
Project	Sports/events	Location	Status	Notes
Khelo India Centres	Centres for excellence in sports	Various sites		2 National Centres of Excellence, indigenous games, martial arts school and several other centers will share sporting and physical knowledge.
Maharaja Yadavindra Singh International Cricket Stadium	Cricket	Mullanpur, Punjab	Completed	
Sardar Vallabhbhai Patel Sports Enclave	Multi sports	Ahmedabad, Gujarat	Under construction	Once completed it will be the largest multi sports complex in India. All the venues will be built for hosting 2036 Olympics.
Varanasi Stadium	Cricket	Uttar Pradesh	Under construction	
Udaipur International Cricket Stadium	Cricket	Udaipur	Under construction	
Rajgir International Cricket Stadium	Cricket	Rajgir	Under construction	
RCA Stadium	Cricket	Jaipur	Under construction	World's third-largest cricket stadium coming up in Jaipur
Narendra Modi Stadium	Cricket	Gujarat	Completed	World's largest stadium, with a seating capacity of 132,000 spectators
Birsa Munda International Hockey Stadium	Field hockey	Rourkela, Odisha	Completed	It will be the country's largest field hockey stadium, and will host the 2023 Men's FIH Hockey World Cup.

== UDAN (airports) projects ==
=== Greenfield airports ===
Project	Type	Image	Location	Status
Aligarh Airport	Domestic airport		Aligarh, Uttar Pradesh	Completed
Ankleshwar Airport	Domestic airport		Mandva, Gujarat	Ongoing
Ayodhya Airport	International airport		Ayodhya, Uttar Pradesh	Completed
Azamgarh Airport	Domestic airport		Azamgarh, Uttar Pradesh	Completed
Bhogapuram Airport	International airport		Visakhapatnam, Andhra Pradesh	Completed
Chennai greenfield airport, Parandur	International airport		Chennai, Tamil Nadu	Ongoing
Chitrakoot Airport	Domestic airport		Chitrakoot, Uttar Pradesh	Completed
Deoghar Airport	Domestic airport		Deoghar, Jharkhand	Completed
Dhalbhumgarh Airport	Domestic airport		Jamshedpur, Jharkhand	Ongoing
Dholera International Airport	International airport		Ahmedabad, Gujarat	Ongoing
Donyi Polo Airport	Domestic airport		Itanagar, Arunachal Pradesh	Completed
Kanpur Airport	Domestic airport		Kanpur, Uttar Pradesh	Completed
Karaikal Airport	Domestic airport		Karaikal, Pondicherry	Ongoing
Kota Greenfield Airport	Domestic airport		Kota, Rajasthan	Ongoing
Kurnool Airport	Domestic airport		Kurnool, Andhra Pradesh	Completed
Kushinagar International Airport	International airport		Kushinagar, Uttar Pradesh	Completed
Ludhiana International Airport	International airport		Ludhiana, Punjab	Completed
Manohar International Airport	International airport		Mopa, Goa	Completed
Minicoy Airport	Domestic airport		Minicoy Island, Lakshadweep	Ongoing
Moradabad Airport	Domestic airport		Moradabad, Uttar Pradesh	Completed
Navi Mumbai International Airport	International airport		Navi Mumbai, Maharashtra	Completed
New Pune Airport	International airport		Pune, Maharashtra	Ongoing
Noida International Airport	International airport		Noida, Uttar Pradesh	Completed
Pakyong Airport	Domestic airport		Gangtok, Sikkim	Completed
Puri International Airport	International airport		Puri, Odisha	Ongoing
Rajkot International Airport	International airport		Rajkot, Gujarat	Completed
Rewa Airport	Domestic Airport		Rewa, Madhya Pradesh	Completed
Sabarimala Greenfield Airport	International airport		Kottayam, Kerala	Ongoing
Shivamogga Airport	Domestic airport		Shimoga, Karnataka	Completed
Shravasti Airport	Domestic airport		Shravasti, Uttar Pradesh	Completed
Surat International Airport	International airport		Surat, Gujarat	Completed
Utkela Airport	Domestic airport		Utkela, Odisha	Completed
Vadhavan Airport	International airport		Vadhavan, Maharashtra	Ongoing
Vijayawada Airport	International airport		Vijaywada, Andhra Pradesh	Completed
Vuakmual Airport	Domestic airport		Vuakmual, Mizoram	Ongoing
Warangal Airport	Domestic airport		Warangal, Telangana	Ongoing

=== Proposed airports ===
Project	Type	Location	Status
Bijapur Airport	Domestic airport	Vijaypura, Karnataka	Proposed
Chandrapur Greenfield Airport	Domestic airport	Chandrapur, Maharashtra	Proposed
Chaukhutia Airport	Domestic airport	Chaukhutia, Uttarakhand	Proposed
Kishtwar Airport	Domestic airport	Kishtwar, Jammu and Kashmir	Proposed
Kohima Chiethu Airport	Domestic airport	Chiethu, Nagaland	Proposed
Kothagudem Airport	Domestic airport	Kothagudem, Telangana	Proposed
Mandi Airport	Domestic airport	Mandi, Himachal	Proposed
New Bellary airport	Domestic airport	Bellary, Karnataka	Proposed
Nizamabad Airport	Domestic airport	Nizamabad, Andhra Pradesh	Proposed
Rajpipla Airport	Domestic airport	Rajpipla, Gujarat	Proposed
Ramagundam Airport	Domestic airport	Ramagundam, Telangana	Proposed

=== Aerocities ===
Project	Type	Location	Status
Lucknow Aerocity	New aerocity	Lucknow, Uttar Pradesh	Under construction
Navi Mumbai Aerocity	New aerocity	Navi Mumbai, Maharashtra	Under construction
Noida Aerocity	New aerocity	Noida, Uttar Pradesh	Under-Construction

Urban development projects

=== Township projects ===
Project	Location	Status	Notes
AURIC City	Aurangabad	Completed	
Navya Ayodya	Ayodhya	In progress	
NAINA City	Navi Mumbai	In progress	
YEIDA City	Noida	In progress	
HRRL Refinery Township	Barmar	In progress	
Tumakuru Smart City	Sorekunte, Tumakuru	In progress	
New Gurgaon	Gurgaon	In progress	
Dholera SIR	Dholera	Under construction	–
GIFT City	Ahmedabad	Under construction	–
Global City Gurugram	Gurugram	style="background:#FFB; color:black;vertical-align:middle;text-align:center; " class="table-partial"|Under construction	

=== Urban infrastructure projects ===
Project	Image	Location	Status	Notes
Kolkata World Trade Centre		Kolkata	Under Construction	Planned to be built in Newtown, Kolkata. Land identification process is underway.
The India Jewellery Park		Navi Mumbai	In progress	
Central Vista Redevelopment Project		New Delhi	Phase 1 completed	Redevelopment of Central Vista which is India's administrative area
Diamond Research and Mercantile City		Surat	Phase-I inaugurated	
New Delhi World Trade Center		New Delhi	In progress	Located strategically at heart of Capital Region of New Delhi, Nauroji nagar is set to be the most preferred business district of the nation. NBCC, a public sector enterprise has been given the contract for construction of the building.
Dhanadhanya Auditorium		Kolkata	Completed	NBCC built the state of art Dhana Dhanya Auditorium at Alipore. The six-floor auditorium with a conch shape structure is made with a cost of Rs. 440 Co. and is 510 feet in length and 210 feet in width.
Telangana Secretariat		Hyderabad	Completed	Telangana Secretariat, officially known as Dr. B. R. Ambedkar Telangana State Secretariat situated at Hyderabad, is the administrative office of the employees of the Government of Telangana in India.
India International Convention and Expo Centre (IICC)		New Delhi	Completed	
Pragati Maidan revamp		New Delhi	Completed	
Nita Mukesh Ambani Cultural Centre (NMACC)		Mumbai	Completed	NMACC is India's first-of-its-kind, multi-disciplinary cultural space as it showcases India's finest offerings in music, theatre, fine arts, and crafts. The centre marks another definitive step in strengthening India's cultural infrastructure and bringing to fruition the best of India and the world in the sphere of arts.
Surat Diamond Bourse		Surat	Completed	Surat Diamond Bourse is a diamond exchange under construction as of 2020 in DREAM City, Surat, Gujarat, India. The project would be India's second diamond trading hub based at Surat, Gujarat, spread across 35.54 acres with availability of 6.6 million Sq.ft. built up area encompassing 4,000 offices for national and international traders.
New Parliament House, New Delhi		New Delhi	Completed	New greenfield parliament building
Bharat Mandapam		New Delhi	Completed	New greenfield expo building

== See also ==
- Bharatmala
- Sagarmala
- Expressways of India
- Urban rail transit in India
- High-speed rail in India
- Emerging Kerala
