= Ports in Odisha =

Transportation in the Indian state

Ports in Odisha
Operational; Under construction

The state of Odisha has a long coastline of 574.71 km in the eastern peninsular India. The coastline is spread over Balasore, Bhadrak, Kendrapara, Jagatsinghpur, Puri and Ganjam districts. There is one major and 2 minor ports, with fourteen ports under development which have been notified by the Government of Odisha.

== Modern history ==
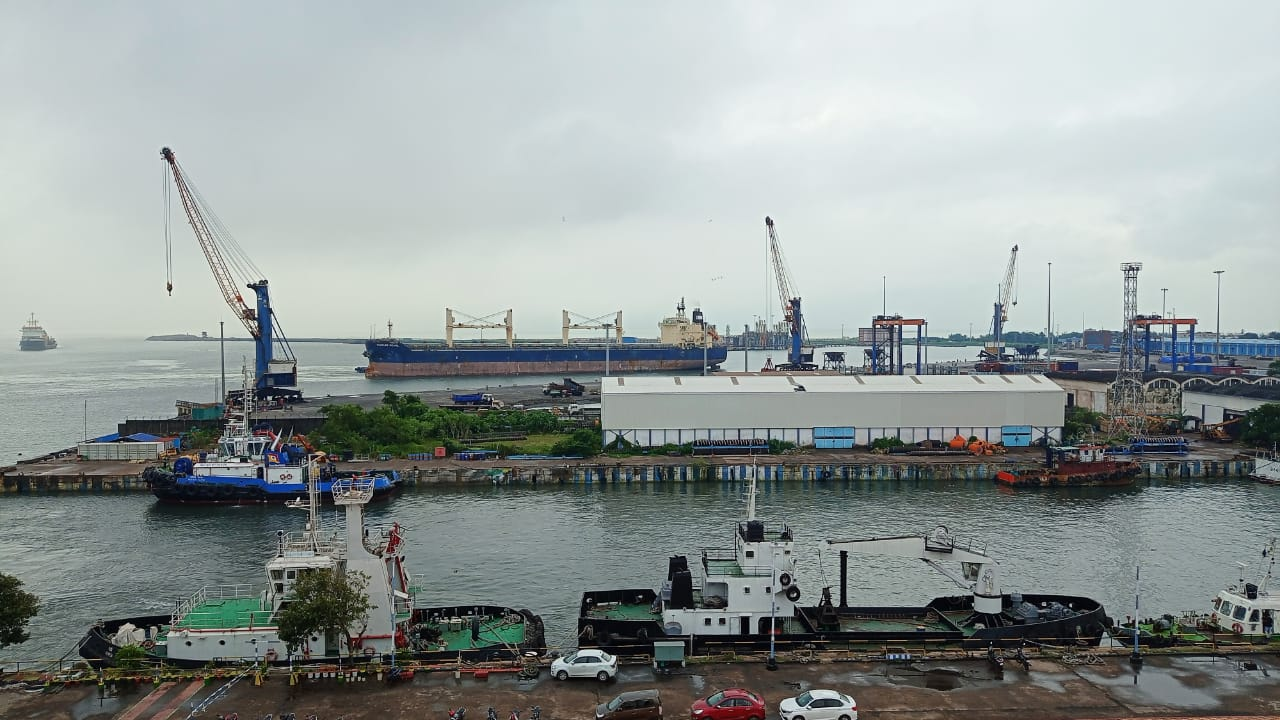
Paradip Port

The primary and the only major port in the state is the Paradip Port. Biju Patnaik, the then Chief Minister of Odisha, is the founding father of Paradip Port. It is situated 210 nautical miles south of Kolkata and 260 nautical miles north of Vishakhapatnam on the east coast on the shore of Bay of Bengal.

The Dhamra Port is the second port to start operation, which is located in Bhadrak district, Odisha, India, on the shore of the Bay of Bengal about seven kilometres from Dhamra town. The agreement to develop the port was signed by the state government in April 1998. The Port received its first vessel on 8 February 2010 and the first commercial vessel on 10 April 2011.

The Gopalpur port started commercial operations in 2013 as an all-weather port. Around 7,500 metric tonne of ilmenite, a sand mineral product of Orissa Sand Complex (OSCOM) division of Indian Rare Earths Limited(IREL), was shipped in a small vessel to South Korea.

== Maritime Board ==
The Odisha Maritime Board was established on 28 March 2022 by the Government of Odisha as the agency to promote the development of ports and inland waterways in the state of Odisha.

== Cargo handling ==
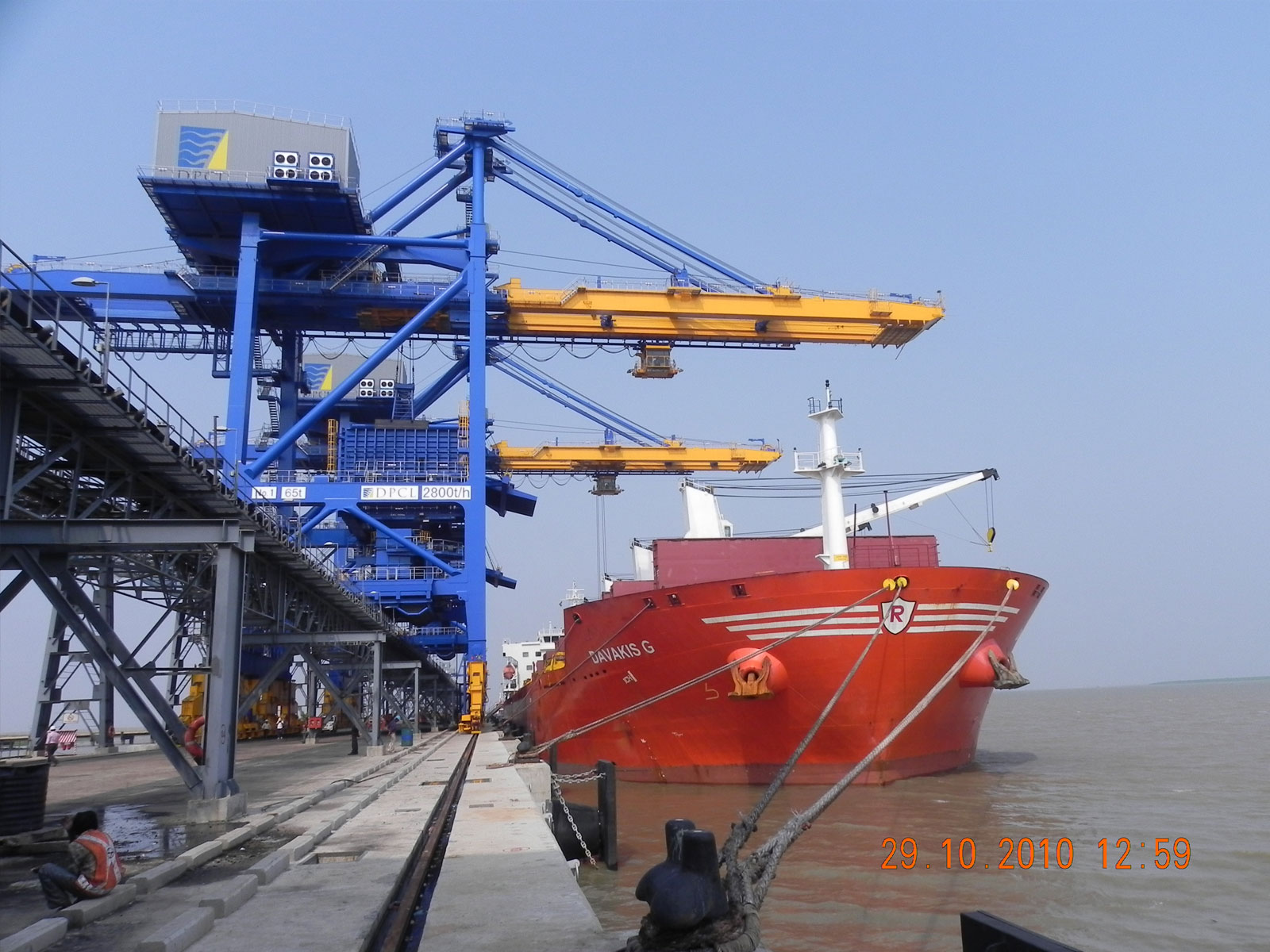
Dhamra Port

The state's ports handled about 190 million tons of cargo in financial year 2023–24. The rated capacity of the Paradip Port is 289 million tonnes per annum. The Dhamra Port has an initial capacity of 25 million tonnes annually, eventually growing to 80 million tonnes annually. The Gopalpur Port has a capacity of 20 MMT.

Port Wise Cargo Handled
S.No.	Port	Capacity (in MMT)	Traffic Handled (in MMT)	FY	Ref.
1	Paradip Port	289	150.40	2024–25	
2	Dhamra Port	60	46.08	2024–25	
3	Gopalpur Port	20	6	2024–25	

== List ==
Port name	Location	Type	Category	Status	Authority
Paradip Port	Paradip, Jagatsinghpur	Major	Seaport	Operational	Government of India
Dhamra Port	Dhamra, Bhadrak	Minor	Seaport	Operational	Dhamra Port Company Limited
Gopalpur Port	Gopalpur, Ganjam	Minor	Seaport	Operational	Gopalpur Port Limited
Subarnarekha Port	Chaumukh, Balasore	Minor	Seaport	Under Construction	Subarnarekha Port Private Limited
Astaranga Port	Astaranga, Puri	Minor	Seaport	Under Construction	
Jatadhar Port	Nuagan, Jagatsinghpur	Minor	Captive jetty	Under Construction	
Mahanadi Port	Akhadasali, Kendrapara	Minor	Riverine port	Proposed	
Bahuda Port	Sonapur, Ganjam	Minor	Seaport	Proposed	Paradip Port Authority/Government of India
