= Vadhavan Port =

Vadhvan Port
- Interactive map of Vadhvan Port
- Location in India Maharashtra

Location
- Country: India
- Location: Vadhvan, Palghar, Maharashtra
- Coordinates: 19°55.8′N 72°39.6′E

Details
- Operated by: Vadhvan Port Project Limited (VPPL), Jawaharlal Nehru Port Authority
- Owned by: Government of India and Government of Maharashtra
- Type of harbour: Offshore Deepsea Port
- Draft depth: 20 metres (66 ft)

Statistics
- Website https://vadhvanport.in/

Vadhavan Port is an approved deep seaport at Vadhavan in Palghar district of Maharashtra in India. The ground breaking for start of construction was done by Prime Minister Narendra Modi on 30 August 2024. The concept plan for an offshore mega Port project was designed by Surendra Sharma a fellow of NMIS in 2015 for MMB; the Jawaharlal Nehru Port Authority (JNPA) is responsible for the construction of the port. When completed, it is slated to be India's first offshore port built on an artificial island and the second Mother Port in India after Vizhinjam International Seaport Thiruvananthapuram according to Sagar Mala project. It is estimated that the construction of the port will cost ₹76,220 crore (US$8.0 billion). Vadhavan will be constructed by Vadhavan Port Project Limited, a special purpose vehicle. Jawaharlal Nehru Port will have a 74 percent stake in the project and Maharashtra Maritime Board will have 26 percent in a public private partnership.

The port will consist of an artificial island, and its berths along with the inner navigable channel will be surrounded by breakwater, while the outer navigable channel will be open sea. Cargo will be handled through container berths, liquid berths, ro-ro berths and multipurpose cargo berths within harbour. From the Vadhaban Point, towards the sea, a distance of 10 kilometres (6.2 mi) has a natural depth of 20 metres (66 ft), making it possible to handle large ships in the port. The port island which will be built on the Arabian Sea will have depths of more than 20 metres (66 ft) respectively, and will be able to accommodate Ultra Large Container Ships(ULCS) vessels.

== Port infrastructure ==
=== Harbour ===
The harbour of Vadhavan port is planned as an artificial harbour, which will be protected by breakwaters. The harbour will allow large container ships of 233,000 DWT to enter the port. The land required for the construction of cargo handling infrastructure will be reclaimed from the sea by filling with silt.

=== Approach channel ===
Depth of water in the channel
Condition and value of depth		Channels	
Condition	Value	Approach channel	Inner channel
Natural depth	Seabed (below CD)	17–20 metres (56–66 ft)	15–17 metres (49–56 ft)
Natural depth	Dredged	20 metres (66 ft)	17.5 metres (57 ft)
Tidal depth	Minimum (with minimum tidal advantage)	22 metres (72 ft)	19.5 metres (64 ft)
Tidal depth	Maximum (with HHWS)	24.7 metres (81 ft)	22.2 metres (73 ft)

A 4 kilometres (2.5 mi) long approach channel outside breakwater will be connect the 17.5 metres (57 ft) CD deep water body of Arabian sea to the harbour for ships movement. The approach channel has a design depth of 20 metres (66 ft) and a minimum width of 732 metres (2,402 ft), but the harbor depth of 17.5 metres (57 ft) CD (1st phase) will allow vessels of 14.5 metres (48 ft) draft to enter and exit the harbour without tidal support. However, the mean sea level (MSL) observed in the port area is 2.8 metres (9.2 ft), which increases the depth of the approach channel and harbour. The depth of the inner channel and manoeuvring area will be more than 19.5 metres (64 ft) with minimum tidal advantage; vessels with a draft of 16.5 metres (54 ft) are capable of navigating in this water depth.

=== Container terminal ===
Initial plans to build the port include four container terminals in the first phase; each terminal consists of 2 berths with a 1,000 metres (3,300 ft) long wharf. The deck height of the wharves is 7.6 metres (25 ft) above the chart datum or mean lower low water (MLLW). Each berth of these terminals will have facilities for handling vessels with a maximum length of 400 metres (1,300 ft) and a beam of 61 metres (200 ft).

== Vadhavan airport ==
There are plans to develop an offshore airport on an artificial island adjacent to the sea port which will be the first in the country. The airport will be similar to the Hong Kong International Airport and Kansai International Airport. As of 26 February 2025, the project received approval from the environment and defence ministries. A feasibility study will be conducted by the Airports Authority of India (AAI) before an investment is finalised. The location is 125 km (78 mi) from the Mumbai International Airport. The airport will be integrated with other transport infrastructure like the Vadhavan Port, metro link to Western Railway zone, Mumbai–Ahmedabad high-speed rail corridor, Delhi–Mumbai Expressway, Uttan–Virar Sea Link as well as an eight-lane road link with the Mumbai Metropolitan Region.

As of 25 January 2026, the project is estimated to cost ₹45,000 crore (US$4.7 billion), which includes ₹25,000 crore (US$2.6 billion) earmarked for land reclamation. The airport will have an annual capacity of 90 million passengers and 3 million metric tonnes of cargo. The pre-feasibility study is being conducted by the Maharashtra Airport Development Company since 2025 and is nearing completion. The airport will feature two parallel runways.

== See also ==
- Transport in India
- List of ports in India
- Sagar Mala project

== Bibliography ==
- JNPT (2023). Environmental Impact Assessment Report for Development of A Greenfield Port at Vadhavan (PDF) (Report). Maharashtra Pollution Control Board.
