= Astaranga Port =

Proposed port in Odisha, India

Astaranga Port is a deep-water, all-weather port proposed to be constructed at Astaranga in Puri district in the Indian state of Odisha.

== Background ==
For over 40 years there was only one major port in Odisha, at Paradip with less major Gopalpur Port and Dhamra Port. That picture has changed dramatically in the past few years.

Based on a study by IIT Madras, the Government of Odisha had identified 13 locations along the state's 480 kilometres (300 mi) coast line as suitable for setting up of ports. Thereafter, in order to facilitate the setting up of new ports with participation of private parties the state government had formulated in 2004 a separate port policy.

Apart from the Dhamra port, which is set to be operational by mid-2010, progress has been achieved in setting up two other ports – Subarnarekha Port at Balasore Astaranga port in Puri. After implementation of these projects, Odisha is expected to become the vital exit point for not only the state, but other land-locked states like Chhattisgarh, Jharkhand and Madhya Pradesh.

== Port development ==
Hyderabad-based Navayuga Engineering Co. will construct the Rs. 6 billion port at Astaranga. The company will implement the port project near the Devi River in three phases on a build- own-operate-share-transfer basis, with an investment of Rs. 1.50 billion in the first phase. The second and third phase of the project will comprise Rs. 2 billion and Rs. 2.50 billion, respectively. Astaranga is one of the four new ports being set up on the Odisha coast. Nineteen sites for ports have been identified on the Odisha coast. Navayug Engineering Company Limited submitted techno-feasibility report with the State government for setting up port at Astaranga in Puri district. It approached East Coast Railway to extend the project a rail link.

The Odisha government has relaxed a vital clause in its MoU with the Navayuga Engineering Company Limited (NECL) enabling the latter to sign a concession agreement with it for developing an all weather port at Astaranga.
