= Patgaon =

Village in Maharashtra

Patgaon Dam
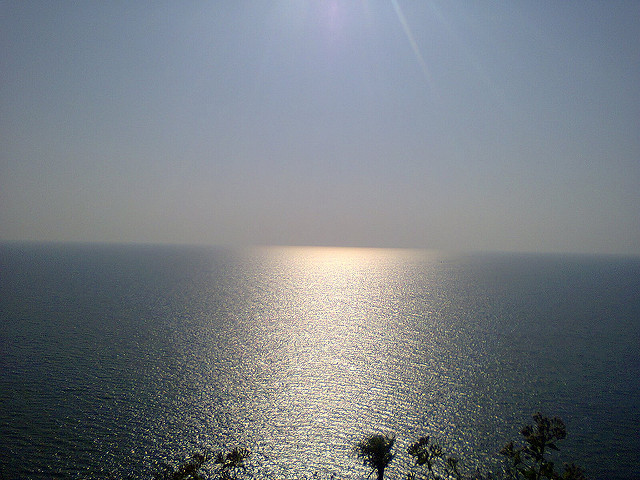
- Sunlight over Patgaon reservoir

- Location within Maharashtra
- Official name: Patgaon Dam D03059
- Location: Patgaon
- Coordinates: 16°07′30.7″N 73°55′48.3″E
- Status: Operational
- Owners: Government of Maharashtra, India

Dam and spillways
- Type of dam: Earthen
- Impounds: Vedganga River
- Height: 39.19 m (128.6 ft)
- Length: 1,101.5 m (3,614 ft)

Reservoir
- Total capacity: 105.242

Patgaon is a village in Bhudargad Taluka of Kolhapur District, Maharashtra state in western India.The latitude 16.1253483"N and longitude 73.9459679"E are the geographical co-ordinates of Patgaon.

== Geography ==
According to the 2011 Census of India, the village has a total area of 1057.73 hectares. It is located at a distance of 85.3 km from Kolhapur.

== Demographics ==
As of the Census of India 2011 the population of Patgaon was 1495 people, out of which 747 were males and 748 were females. There are around 373 households in Patgaon. In Patgaon village population of children with age 0-6 is 114 which makes up 7.63% of total population of village. Average Sex Ratio of Patgaon village is 1001 which is higher than Maharashtra state average of 929. Child Sex Ratio for the Patgaon as per census is 606, lower than Maharashtra's average of 894. Literacy rate of Patgaon village is 81.97% compared to 82.34% of Maharashtra. In Patgaon Male literacy stands at 92.90% while female literacy rate is 71.49%.

Patgaon village is administrated by Sarpanch (Head of Village) who is elected representative of village, as per constitution of India and Panchayati Raaj Act.

== History ==
Patgaon is well known for the samadhi of Shri Mouni Maharaj. Shri Mouni maharaj was one of the gurus of Maratha King Chhatrapati Shivaji Maharaj.

== Dam ==
Patgaon Dam is near the village and this dam is built on the Vedganga river.

== Rangana Fort ==
Rangana fort is famous as Prasidhgad, a well known historical monument, is near Patgaon and one has to pass through Patgaon only to reach the fort.

== Language ==
Although Patgaon comes in a Marathi speaking Kolhapur, the people of Patgaon speak in Malvani Konkani language.
