= Neem-coated urea =

Neem-coated urea is a fertilizer, consisting of urea that is coated with neem tree seed oil. It supported by an agriculture scheme of the Government of India to boost the growth of wheat and paddy, and curb the black market and hoarding of urea. In January 2015, the urea manufacturers were mandated by the government to increase their production from 35 percent to 75 percent of their subsidised amounts of neem-coated urea. In her 2019 budget presentation, finance minister Nirmala Sitharaman spoke about increased promotion of neem-coated urea among farmers which will help to reduce the cost of cultivation.

Benefits of neem-coated urea include; increase of crop-specific yields by 15-30% on average along with higher levels of soil fertility.

The patent (US 9 ,884,792 B2) for neem-coated urea is owned by Aditya Birla Nuvo Ltd and its assignees are the Aditya Birla Nuvo Ltd. & Aditya Birla Science and Technology co. ltd. under the guidance of Dr. Prashant Puri, who is the primary innovator in this area.

Other coatings are also used for urea: moringa, sulfur, biochar, other oils and polymers.
