= Vadhavan =

Village in Maharashtra, India

Vadhavan Vadhavan
- village
- Location in Maharashtra, India Vadhavan (India)
- Coordinates: 19.9292303°N 72.6727675°E
- Country: India
- State: Maharashtra
- District: Palghar
- Taluka: Dahanu
- Elevation: 10 m (33 ft)

Population (2011)
  - Total: 1,278
- Time zone: UTC+5:30 (IST)
- 2011 census code: 551722

Vadhavan is a village in the Palghar district of Maharashtra, India. It is located in the Dahanu taluka.

== Vadhavan Transhipment Port ==
The Vadhavan Transshipment Port is a proposed new port that is going to be the country's 13th major port. Situated near the town of Dahanu, in the Palghar district of Maharashtra, the state will have its 3rd port and the country's one of the six mega port. The project is to be executed jointly by Jawaharlal Nehru Port Trust (JNPT) and Maharashtra Maritime Board.

Vadhvan Port was designed by Surendra Sharma who is a fellow of NMIS Mumbai and has been advocating a deep-sea hub Port to cater to the growing needs of India. This port project development will be jointly implemented by JNPA and Maharashtra Maritime Board with a shareholding of 74% and 26% respectively. The port will be developed based on Landlord Port Model.

== Vadhavan Airport ==
In February 2025, the Maharashtra Airport Development Company (MADC), floated a request for proposal (RFP) to appoint a consultant agency to carry out a pre-feasibility study on developing a greenfield airport in the Vadhavan port region as the 3rd airport for the Mumbai Metropolitan Region after CSMIA and NMIA. The Agency will study the conditions at the site, traffic projections, environmental factors, and viability of the project, and analyse potential integration with existing and future infrastructure developments, such as the Dedicated Freight Corridor and road connectivity to the port.

MADC received 7 bids when technical bids were opened in May, out of which only 3 bidders qualified to the financial bid opening stage. The lowest bidder, Grant Thornton – Nippon Koei India JV was awarded a Rs. 30 lakh contract in July 2025. The proposed airport is expected to support cargo movement and improve last-mile logistics efficiency, further reducing the cost and time of goods transportation. The study commenced in the last week of July and is expected to be completed in six to nine months.

== Demographics ==
According to the 2011 census of India, Vadhavan has 296 households. The effective literacy rate (i.e. the literacy rate of population excluding children aged 6 and below) is 91.58%.

Demographics (2011 Census)
	Total	Male	Female
Population	1278	639	639
Children aged below 6 years	114	59	55
Scheduled caste	0	0	0
Scheduled tribe	56	29	27
Literates	1066	556	510
Workers (all)	688	420	268
Main workers (total)	626	382	244
Main workers: Cultivators	210	190	20
Main workers: Agricultural labourers	69	41	28
Main workers: Household industry workers	33	32	1
Main workers: Other	314	119	195
Marginal workers (total)	62	38	24
Marginal workers: Cultivators	46	29	17
Marginal workers: Agricultural labourers	3	2	1
Marginal workers: Household industry workers	5	4	1
Marginal workers: Others	8	3	5
Non-workers	590	219	371
