= Bhavanapadu =

- Village
- Interactive map of Bhavanapadu
- Location in Andhra Pradesh, India Bhavanapadu (India)
- Coordinates: 18.5667°N 84.3500°E
- Country: India
- State: Andhra Pradesh
- District: Srikakulam
- Elevation: 1 m (3.3 ft)

Population (2011)
  - Total: 2,725

Languages
  - Official: Telugu
- Time zone: UTC+5:30 (IST)
- Vehicle registration: AP–30

Bhavanapadu is a village and panchayat in Santha Bommali mandal of Srikakulam district. It is located in Coastal Andhra region of Andhra Pradesh, India. There are fishing harbor and beach at Bhavanapadu village.

== Mulapeta Port ==
Andhra Pradesh govt renames Bhavanapadu as Mulapeta port on locals request. Andhra CM lays foundation stone for Rs 4,362 cr Mulapeta Port in April 2023.

== Demographics ==
As of 2011 Census of India, the town had a population of 2,725. The total population constitute, 1,373 males, 1,352 females and 256 children, in the age group of 0–6 years. The average literacy rate stands at 50.26% with 1,241 literates, significantly lower than the national average of 73.00%.
