= Chandrapur Greenfield Airport =

- IATA: None; ICAO: none

Summary
- Owner: MADC
- Serves: Chandrapur
- Location: Murti
- Coordinates: 19°43′37″N 79°27′40″E

Map
- Location in Maharashtra Chandrapur Greenfield Airport (India)

Chandrapur Greenfield Airport is a greenfield airport to be built at Murti, 42 kilometres south of Chandrapur, Maharashtra, India. The Maharashtra Airport Development Company (MADC) is the nodal agency for the project. The airport will be developed in two phases. The first phase will be built on 720 acres of land, with a 2000 metre runway capable of handling turboprop aircraft like the Bombardier Q400 and ATR 72. In the second phase, the runway will be extended to 3000 metres to accommodate narrow-body jet aircraft like the Airbus A320. The Airports Authority of India submitted its pre-feasibility report in January 2018, approving the site for the construction of a greenfield airport. Following this, the State government gave approval for the project and sanctioned funds for acquisition of 463 acres of private land and other administrative processes. The land acquisition for the airport was expected to be completed by the end of the financial year 2020/21.
