= Mahanadi Riverine Port =

Proposed port in Odisha, India

Coordinates: 20.2920°N 86.7088°E

Mahanadi Riverine port (Odia: ମହାନଦୀ ବନ୍ଦର) is a deep-water, all-weather port proposed to be constructed at the mouth of Mahanadi River in Kendrapara district in the Indian state of Odisha.

== Background ==
For over 40 years there was only one major port in Odisha, at Paradip with less major ports at Gopalpur and Dhamra Port. That picture has changed dramatically in the past few years.

Based on a study by IIT Madras, the Government of Odisha had identified 13 locations along the state's 480 kilometres (300 mi) coast line as suitable for setting up of ports. Thereafter, in order to facilitate the setting up of new ports with participation of private parties the state government had formulated in 2004 a separate port policy. By which private companies are investing in the state of Odisha to develop non-major ports. The Mahanadi Riverine Port is one of them.

== Location ==
The Port will be located in the North Bank of Mahanadi River in the revenue village Mahakalpada, Dist. Kendrapara.

=== Communication ===
The nearest Airport is Bhubaneswar & Railway Station is Kendrapara railway station. The distance from Kendrapara is 25 km by road and about 108 km. from Bhubaneswar, the state capital of Odisha.
