= IREL (India) =

Government-owned mining corporation

IREL (India) Limited

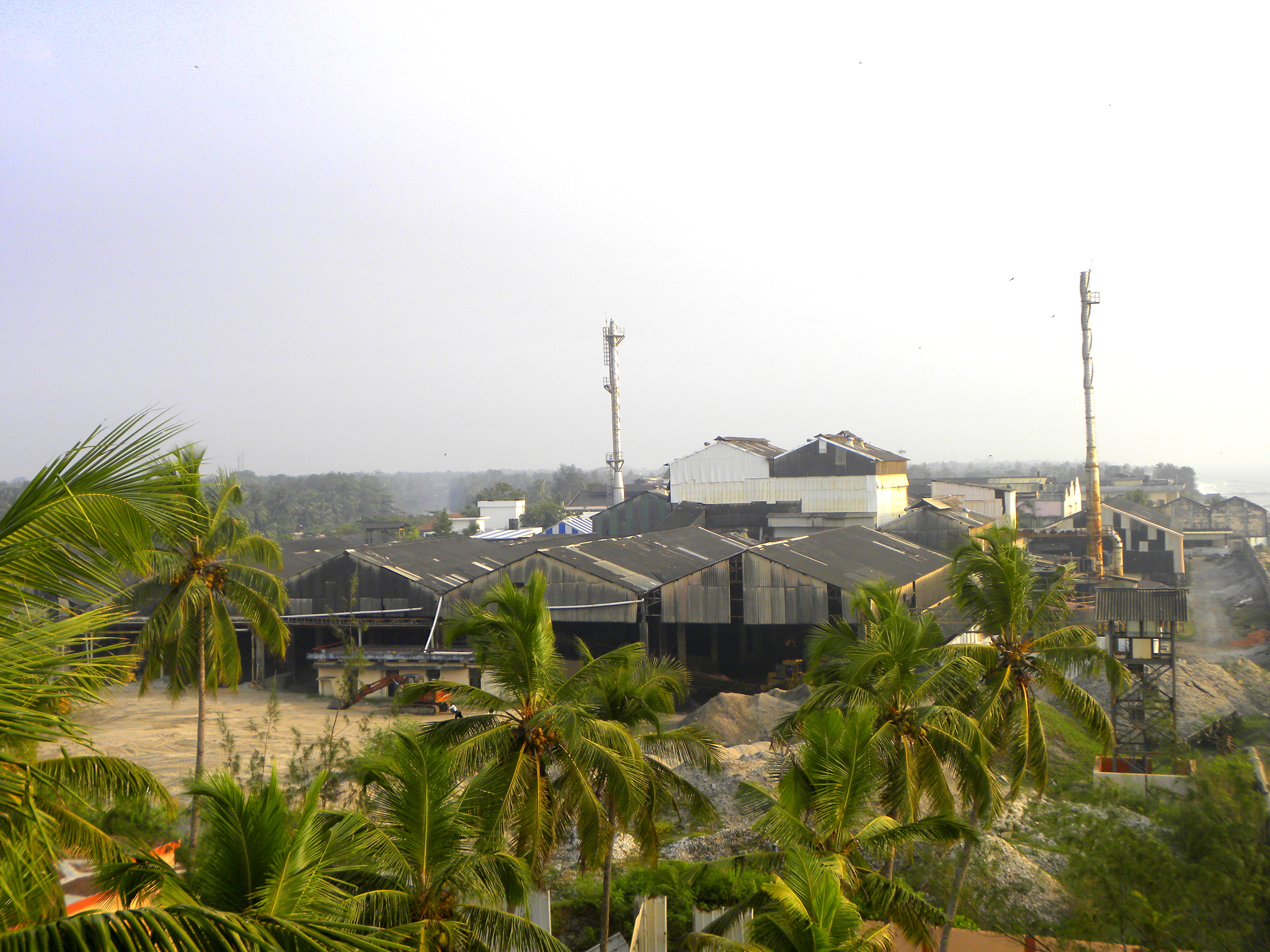
- IRE centre in Kollam, Kerala
- Formerly: Indian Rare Earths Limited
- Type: Public Sector Undertaking
- Industry: Rare Earth Extraction
- Founded: 18 August 1950
- Headquarters: 1207, Veer Savakar Marg, Prabhadevi, near Siddhi Vinayak temple, Mumbai, India
- Key people: D. Singh (Chairman & MD)
- Products: Ilmenite; Leucoxene; Rutile; Zircon; Garnet; Sillimanite; Lanthanum carbonate Cerium(III) carbonate Neodymium; Praseodymium; Samarium; Gadolinium; Yttrium; NdPr Oxalate; Thorium(IV) nitrate Trisodium phosphate Rare Earth Chloride
- Revenue: ▲₹1,536.30 crore (US$160 million) (2021)
- Operating income: ▲₹500.12 crore (US$53 million) (2021)
- Net income: ▲₹315.68 crore (US$34 million) (2021)
- Total assets: ▲₹1,703.55 crore (US$180 million) (2021)
- Total equity: ▲₹1,167.15 crore (US$120 million) (2021)
- Owner: Government of India
- Number of employees: 1222 (March 2021)
- Website: irel.co.in

IREL (India) Limited, formerly Indian Rare Earths Ltd, is an Indian Public Sector Undertaking based in Mumbai, Maharashtra. It specializes in mining and refining rare earth metals.

It has installed capacity to process about 10,000 MT of rare earth bearing mineral. As regards production, capacity and capabilities in terms of mining, processing, extraction, refining and production of high pure RE oxides is adequately available in India. The company primarily exports it's rare earth compounds to USA, UK, France, Germany, Norway, and Japan.

== Production facilities ==
=== Rare Earths Division (RED) Eloor ===
This plant, the first unit of IREL, became operational in 1952 for the processing of monazite, whose capacity was subsequently increased by about three times. Rare Earths Division (RED), Udyogamandal, Eloor is located on the banks of Periyar River in Kerala, some 12 km from the port city of Kochi and 15 km from Kochi International Airport.

In 2012, the plant was refurbished to process mixed rare earth chlorides. It produces high pure individual rare earth compounds of lanthanum and cerium in oxide and carbonate form, and that of neodymium-praseodymium, samarium, gadolinium and yttrium in oxide and oxalate form (with more than 99% Purity). RED also produces strategic materials for the Department of Atomic Energy.

=== Odisha Sand Complex (OSCOM) and OSCOM - Rare Earth Extraction Plant (REEP) ===
IREL commissioned its largest division called Odisha Sand Complex (OSCOM) at Chhatrapur, Odisha. Today IREL operates these four units along with a corporate office in Mumbai and a unit located in Manavalakurichi of Kanyakumari district. It produces/sells six heavy minerals namely ilmenite, rutile, zircon, monazite, sillimanite, and garnet as well as various value added products.

From 1 May 2015 it started commercial operation of Monazite Processing Plant at Orissa to process 10000tpa monazite to produce 11220tpa of rare earth chloride, 13500 tri-sodium phosphate, 26tpa NGADU etc. Similarly High Pure Rare Earth facility also commenced operation to refine pure rare earth compounds. In 2013 Gopalpur port shipped 7,500 metric tonne of ilmenite from Orissa Sand Complex (OSCOM) to South Korea for the first time after IREL started the operation. Monazite deposit in Odisha contains rare earths like, Lanthanum, Cerium, Praseodymium, Neodymium etc. It also contains Thorium which is a "prescribed substance", the list of which was revised in 2006 under the Atomic Energy Act, 1962.

IREL has set up a Rare Earth Extraction plant (REEP) producing mixed Rare Earth chloride (MRCL) Tri-sodium phosphate etc., at its unit OSCOM Odisha. MRCL produced from the above plant is processed at IREL's plant at Rare Earth Division (RED) in Aluva Kerala for producing separated High Pure Rare Earth (HPRE) Oxides/Compounds.Rare Earth processing unit having installed capacity of 11200 tpa mixed Rare Earth Chlorides was commissioned in the year 2015–16.

=== Manavalakurichi unit (MK) ===
IREL opened the division in 1963 after becoming a fully public sector undertaking under the administrative control of the Department of Atomic Energy (DAE), Government of India, IREL will carry out beach sand mining and extract heavy minerals at an area of 1,144.06 hectare in eight villages of Kanniyakumari district. It currently holds beach sand mining lease for an area of 178.06 hectare including 29.78 hectare in Midalam and Keezhmidalam,148.27 hectare in Manavalakurichi of Kanyakumari district.

IREL has a mineral manufacturing unit functioning in Manavalakurichi village near Colachel in Kanniyakumari for extracting ilmenite, zircon, rutile, monazite and sillimanite. Annual production capacity of MK mineral separation plant is 91,200 tonnes per annum (tpa) of Ilmenite and other associated minerals such as rutile, zircon and garnet.

=== Chavara Mineral Division ===
Chavara mineral separation plant is located 10 km north of Kollam and 85 km from Thiruvananthapuram the Capital of Kerala. It is about 135 km from Kochi, the major port in Kerala. The nearest airport is at Thiruvananthapuram. The adjacent area of Chavara is blessed with one of the best mineral sand deposits in the country – the renowned "Q" Grade minerals.

The Chavara mines contain as high as 40% heavy minerals extending over a stretch of 23 km in the coastal belt of Neendakara and Kayamkulam, The deposits is quite rich with ilmenite, rutile, zircon, sillimanite and is unique with weathered variety having 60% TiO_{2} ilmenite.

The plant has a capacity to produce 2,35,900 tpa of ilmenite and associated minerals such as rutile, zircon and sillimanite. It has a facility to produce Zirflor in sizes (-300 and -200) in the zircon opacifier plant. The plant operates on an advanced modular design with state of the art equipment in mineral separation and has a well - equipped quality control laboratory for quality assurance. It is certified for ISO 9001:2008, 14001:2004 and 18001:2007.

=== Rare Earth Permanent Magnet Plant (REPM), Vishakapatnam ===
This plant was opened in 2023. IREL has set up this plant for producing Rare Earth Permanent Magnet (REPM) at Visakhapatnam based on Indigenous Technology. This plant produces samarium-cobalt permanent magnets.

The plant has an annual capacity of 3,000 kg and overall cost is 197 crore. The Facility has been established based on indigenous technology developed by BARC and DMRL and using indigenous rare earth Samarium resources.

=== Rare Earth & Titanium Theme Park, Bhopal ===
IREL has established plants for production of Lanthanum, Cerium and Neodymium metals at Rare Earth & Titanium Theme Park, Bhopal.

=== IRERC, Kollam ===
The Corporate Research Centre is located at Kollam, Kerala and carries out research in the field of value added products from beach sand minerals, undertakes consultancy projects on mineral separation and flow sheet development, carrying out mineral analysis and caters to the needs of internal and external customers.

== Research and development ==
IREL Technology Development Council (IRELTDC) is formed with an objective of promoting industrial scale research and development (R&D) that would be beneficial to the overall programme of DAE in both strategic and non-strategic fields utilizing mineral & value-added products of IREL. Council invites funds and monitors R&D project proposals from CSIR, IITs, State & Central laboratories, for large scale application & exploitation on the areas of technology of mutual interest.

=== List of completed R&D projects ===
1. Augmentation of PREE solvent extraction test facility at RED.
2. Pilot-scale production for nanosize rare earth phosphates and development of potential industrial application areas.
3. Design and development of environmentally secure rare earth based colorants.
4. Inflight processing of metallised ilmenite in a DC plasma furnace for continuous production of titania-rich slag and pig iron.
5. Development of cerium oxide based nano materials for applications as Chemical-Mechanical Planarisation/Polishing (CMP) slurry.
6. Recovery of heavy rare earths from phosphoric acid using phosphorus-based commercial extractants and their mixtures.
7. Synthesis and properties of electrodeposited nickel/ceria nanocomposite coatings.
8. Catalysis by nano Crystalline Ceria Modifies with Transition Metals.
9. Design and scale-up of Annular Centrifugal Extractor (ACE).
10. Processing of monazite through sulphuric acid for the recovery of rare earths, thorium and uranium.
11. Preparation of mullite and zirconia toughened mullite from sillimanite.
12. Study of suitability of magnetic separators as replacement for air tables for recovery of monazite.
13. Versatile nano zirconia production facility at IREL, OSCOM.
14. High-field composite varistors based on rare earth oxides.
15. Smart magneto rheological elastomers based on rare earth Magnets.
16. Production of nano titania from ilmenite and set up a pilot plant to process 1 ton/batch.
17. Production of environmentally secure rare earth oxide brown pigment for surface coating applications.
18. Optimization of processing parameters to produce high aspect ratio synthetic wollastonite.
19. Improving recovery of heavy minerals at IREL plants using spiral separators.
20. Suitability of rare earth drum magnetic separator to increase plant efficiency at IREL, Chavara.
21. With the help of National Metallurgical Laboratory, Column flotation technology for the beneficiation of sillimanite was successfully developed and demonstrated first at the IREL plant in Orissa. Today it is commercially operating with consistent recovery and grades, both at Chatrapur and Chavara.
22. With help of BARC, Cerium and lanthanum metals have been prepared by fused salt electrolysis from its phosphors, These rare earth based phosphors compounds have been separated and purified from the stock obtained from beach sands.

== Finance ==
IREL records highest-ever sales turnover and PBT in FY 2021–22. According to the company, it has achieved its highest ever sales turnover and profit before tax (PBT) since its inception. The sales turnover and PBT stood at a whopping Rs 1462.05 crore, while the PBT stood at about Rs 700.00 crore, which surpassed the previous year record by 53.3 percent and 68.6 percent respectively.

IREL declared and paid dividend of Rs.166.67 Crores out of the profit for the financial year 2021–22. The total income of the company was Rs. 1536.30 crore.

== Collaboration ==
IREL extracts the rare earth metal and rare earth alloy using the refining technique based on laboratory scale process developed by BARC and DMRL.

IREL (India) Limited renewed its agreement with Toyotsu Rare Earths (India) for creating a critical minerals supply chain. Toyotsu Rare Earths (India) remarkets the rare earth oxides or carbonates like Lanthanum Oxide (LA2O3), Cerium Oxide (CEO2), Praseodymium Oxide (PR6O11), Neodymium Oxide (ND2O3), Praseodymium-Neodymium Oxide ((PRND)2O3) and Cerium Carbonate (CE2(CO3)3) from IREL.IREL suspended the agreement with Toyotsu Rare Earths (India) on 14 June 2025.

Reduction-Diffusion Technique is a process used by the Bhabha Atomic Research Centre (BARC) for the production of enriched uranium as well as magnet production in Rare Earth Permanent Magnet Plant (REPM), Vishakapatnam. IREL uses the same process for thorium and other radio active metals.

== Upcoming projects ==
=== Ambadongar Rare Earth project ===
New carbonatite deposit in Gujarat. Technical feasibility and economic viability studies undertaken.

=== IREL-IDCOL Ltd ===
Setting up of new mining and mineral separation plant for winning beach sand mineral deposits in Puri District of Odisha.

=== Private Freight Terminal (PFT)- OSCOM ===
Conversion of IRELs Private railway siding to Private Freight Terminal

=== Capacity expansion of OSCOM plant ===
Increase in capacity from 2.8 to 6.2 lakh tpa of Ilmenite and associated minerals.

== Export controls ==
In June 2025, it was reported that the Indian government asked IREL to suspend a 13-year-old rare earth export agreement with Japan in order to safeguard supplies for India's domestic uses, as the country is also seeking to reduce dependence on Chinese rare earths imports.
