= Gopalpur Port =

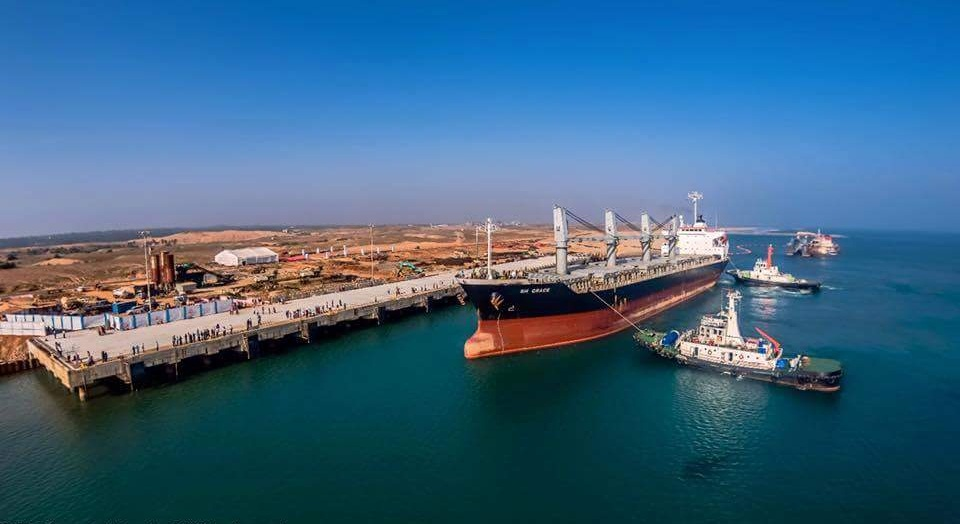
- Interactive map of Gopalpur Port

Location
- Country: India
- Location: Gopalpur, Ganjam, Odisha
- Coordinates: 19.29°N 84.95°E

Details
- Opened: 23 May 2013
- Operated by: Gopalpur Ports Ltd
- Owned by: Adani Ports & SEZ
- Type of Harbor: Natural harbor (sea port)
- No. of berths: 3
- Draft depth: 14.5 metres (48 ft) (Maximum)
- CEO: Capt. Sandeep Agarwal

Statistics
- Website http://www.gopalpurports.in/

Gopalpur Port is a deep sea port of Gopalpur near Brahmapur city in Ganjam District, Odisha, India. The port has been developed on the Bay of Bengal. The seaport will increase the sea trade of Odisha, as well as industry and employment.

Gopalpur port started commercial operations in 2013 as an all-weather port, on a trial basis. Around 7,500 metric tonne of ilmenite, a sand mineral product of Orissa Sand Complex (OSCOM) division of Indian Rare Earths Limited(IREL), was shipped in a small vessel to South Korea. Later on it started operation as a all-weather sea port on the East coast of India.

In December 2022, Petronet LNG Ltd, India's largest liquefied natural gas importer, will set up a floating LNG receipt facility at Gopalpur port in Odisha at a cost of Rs 2,306 crore. The company has signed an agreement with Gopalpur Ports Ltd for the facility that will have a capacity of about 4 million tonnes per annum, it said in a tweet. Gopalpur will be the third LNG terminal on the east coast.

In March 2024, Adani Ports and Special Economic Zone has acquired a 95 per cent stake in Odisha's Gopalpur Port for an equity value of Rs 1,349 crore ($161.74 million). Adani Ports will purchase a 56 per cent stake in Gopalpur Port from real-estate conglomerate Shapoorji Pallonji Group (SP Group) and a 39 per cent stake from Orissa Stevedores.

== Harbor ==
The port has a natural harbor, having a depth of 18.5 meters. Mini cape vessels of over 100,000 DWT can be handled by the port. There are 3 jetties or berths in this port.

== Transport ==
The port is connected to the Kolkata-Chennai railway line and National Highways. The port is connected by the 6 km long National Highway 59. The port is close to National Highway 16 (Kolkata-Chennai), providing good links with Gopalpur. The port is 270 km from Paradip Port and 260 km from Visakhapatnam.

K&R Rail Engineering, a hyderabad based firm has completed the railway track connection for the port. GPL currently uses the siding of Indian Rare Earths Limited for its railway traffic; the siding is served by the station at Chhatrapur, the nearest large town is about 6 km away.
