= Water transport in Mumbai =

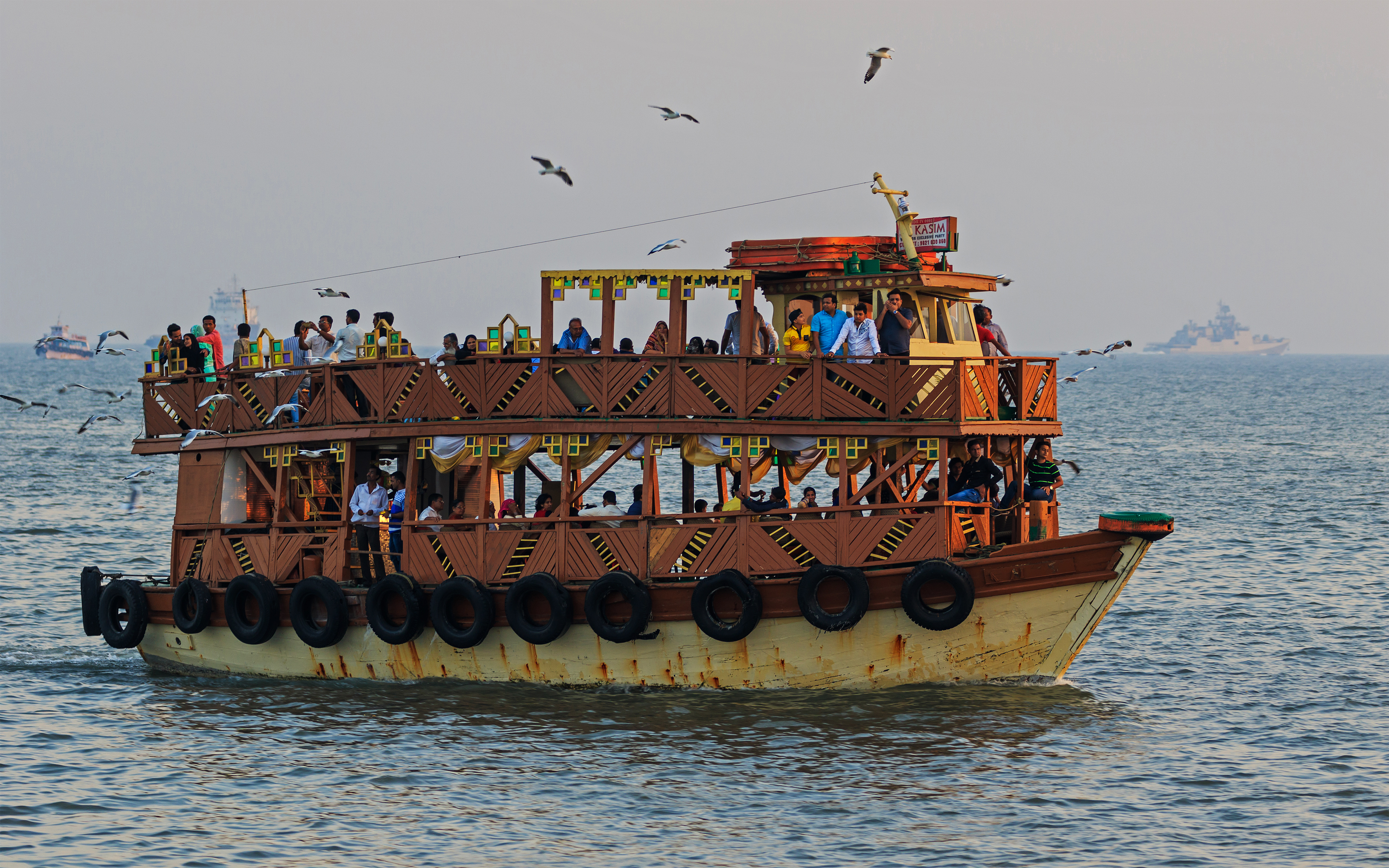
A ferry in Mumbai, near the Gateway of India

Water transport in Mumbai consists of ferries, hovercraft and catamarans.

Proposals to start more water services were initially mooted in the 1990s but were held up due to legal issues. Services are provided by both government agencies as well as private partners.A Mumbai Water metro has been proposed to be set up in the city, on the same lines as the Kochi Water Metro.

== Routes ==
=== Uran - Elephanta ===
The Maharashtra Maritime Board granted permission to a private operator to begin regular ferry services from Mora jetty in Uran to Elephanta (Gharapuri) from 15 April 2017.

=== Western Corridor ===
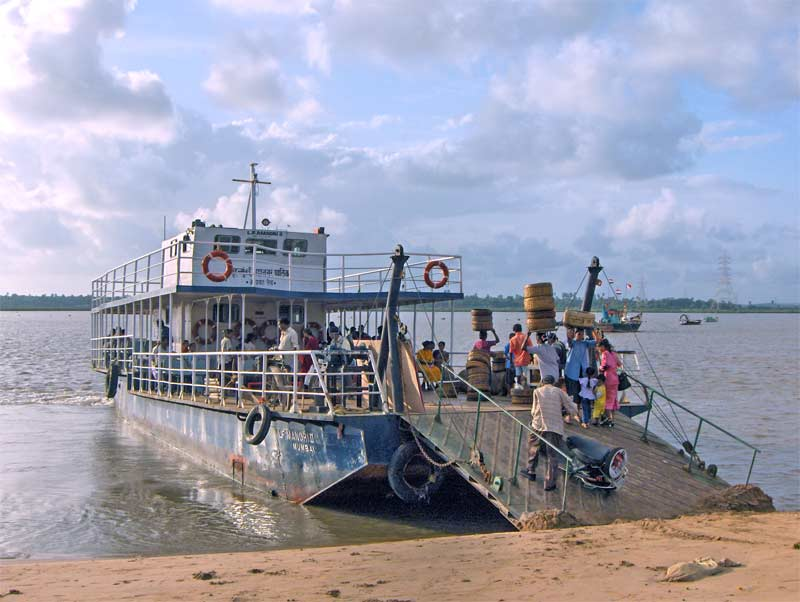
A ferry operated by BEST across the Manori Creek

The Brihanmumbai Electricity Supply and Transport Undertaking (BEST), started a ferry operations between Manori and Marve Beach in 1981, but they were soon taken over by private operators.

Subsequently, the Maharashtra State Road Development Corporation (MSRDC) was selected to undertake the work of setting up terminals at Nariman Point, Bandra, Juhu, Versova, and Marve Beach.

=== Navi Mumbai ===
Hovercraft used to ply between the Gateway of India in Mumbai and CBD Belapur and Vashi in Navi Mumbai between 1994 and 1999 but the services were subsequently stopped due to lack of sufficient water transport infrastructure. The services used British made hovercraft and were operated by as a joint venture between the government and Mahindra and Mahindra, an Indian conglomerate. The City and Industrial Development Corporation (CIDCO) and Maharashtra Maritime Board (MMB) floated proposals to restart hovercraft services from CBD Belapur to reduce travel time from an hour and more to less than half an hour. The CIDCO developed hoverport in CBD Belapur was taken over by the Indian Coast Guard as an ad hoc base for providing security to water transport services till its permanent base at Nerul adjacent to Training Ship Chanakya was set up.

=== Alibaug ===
Catamarans and ferries are operated by private operators from the Gateway of India to Mandwa from where the operators run connecting buses to Alibaug. In 2009, following the 2008 Mumbai attacks, the Government of Maharashtra decided to shut down the jetties at the Gateway of India and instead open up newer ones near the Radio Club for boats bound for Rewas and Mandwa.

In 2011, the Mumbai Metropolitan Region Development Authority (MMRDA), proposed to run roll on roll off (RORO) services from Ferry Wharf to Mandwa.

In March 2020, the Ro-Ro car ferry service between Mumbai and Alibaug was finally launched.

In addition to scheduled catamarans, ferries, and Ro-Ro services, private operators provide on-demand speedboat (water taxi) transfers between Mumbai and Mandwa. These services are generally operated using 6-seater and 12-seater speedboats and are used by tourists, families, and corporate groups travelling to Alibaug and nearby coastal destinations.
