= Marve Island =

Island in India

Coordinates: 19.1968°N 72.7977°E

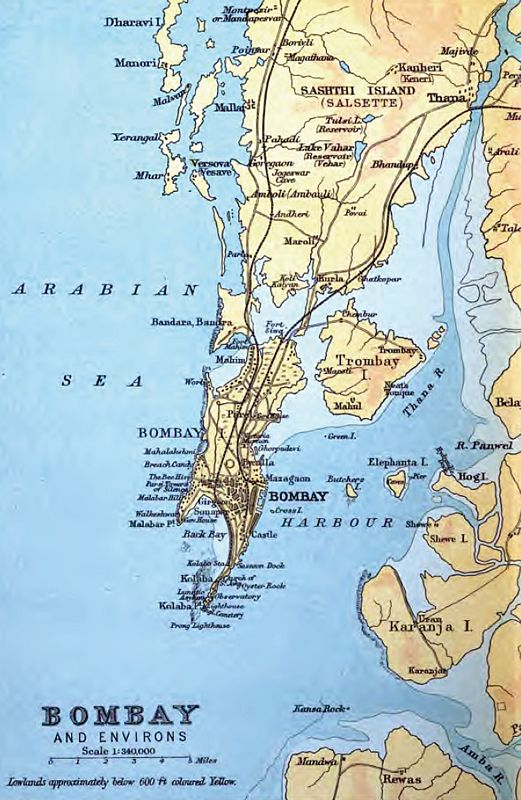
1893 map of Bombay depicting Marve island.

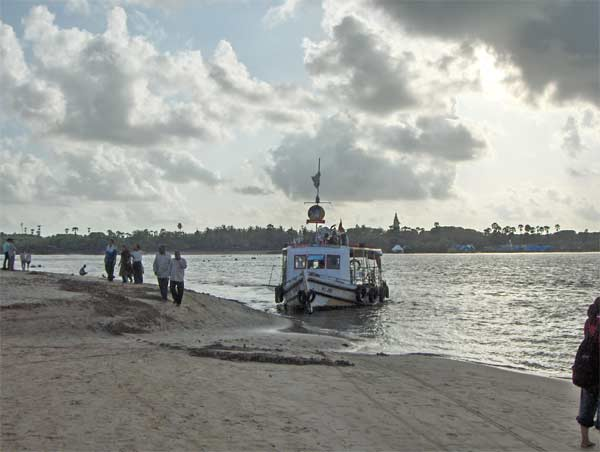
Marve Beach with ferry

Marve Island was among a group of islands that lay to the west of Salsette island near Mumbai, India. Manori and Gorai on Dharavi Island lay to its north while Erangal and Madh on Madh Island lay to its south.

Marve remained separate from the mainland Salsette till as late as 1808, while by the year 1882, access to the island was possible by merely walking across the tidal inlets during low tide. Rapid urbanisation on Salsette island has resulted in the formation of dry land between Marve and Salsette. Marve is now connected to the mainland by a causeway that is part of the Malad - Marve road and to Madh island via a small bridge over a creek at Marve's southern tip.

The Manori Creek flows into the Arabian sea at the northern tip of Marve. Ferry services to Manori operate from Marve Beach. Further south along the western coast lies Aksa Beach. The beach though popular with tourists is not safe for swimming due to the swift currents caused by the creek flowing into the sea resulting in several cases of drownings.

The Resort, a Five Star hotel, is located at Aksa on the Madh- Marve road. The Indian Navy operates a Logistics Training establishment called INS Hamla on Marve. Access to a section of beach adjoining the naval premises is restricted for civilians. The Defence School Kendriya Vidyalaya at INS Hamla, was established in August 1972.
