= Marve =

Marve may refer to:

- Marve (surname)
- Marvé Beach, Mumbai, India
- Marve or Malad Creek, Mumbai
- Marve Island, near Mumbai
- Marve, a synonym for Mondeuse noire, a French wine grape variety
- Marve Almar Fleksnes, protagonist of Fleksnes Fataliteter, a Norwegian-Swedish-Danish sitcom which aired from 1972 and 2002

== See also ==
- Marv (disambiguation)
- Merve, a feminine Turkish given name
