= Kanakeshwar =

Hindu temple in Maharashtra, India

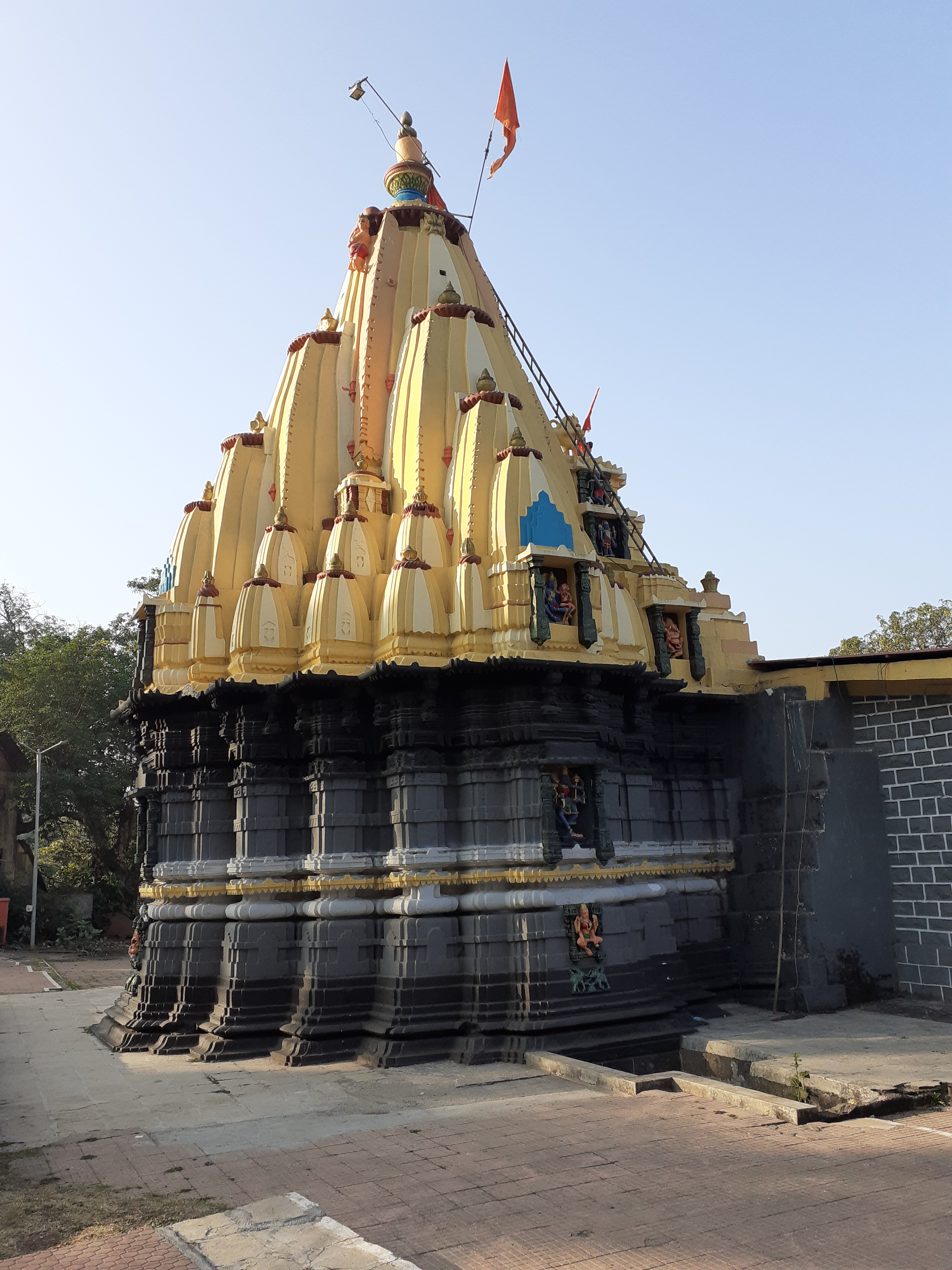
Sun shining on the temple

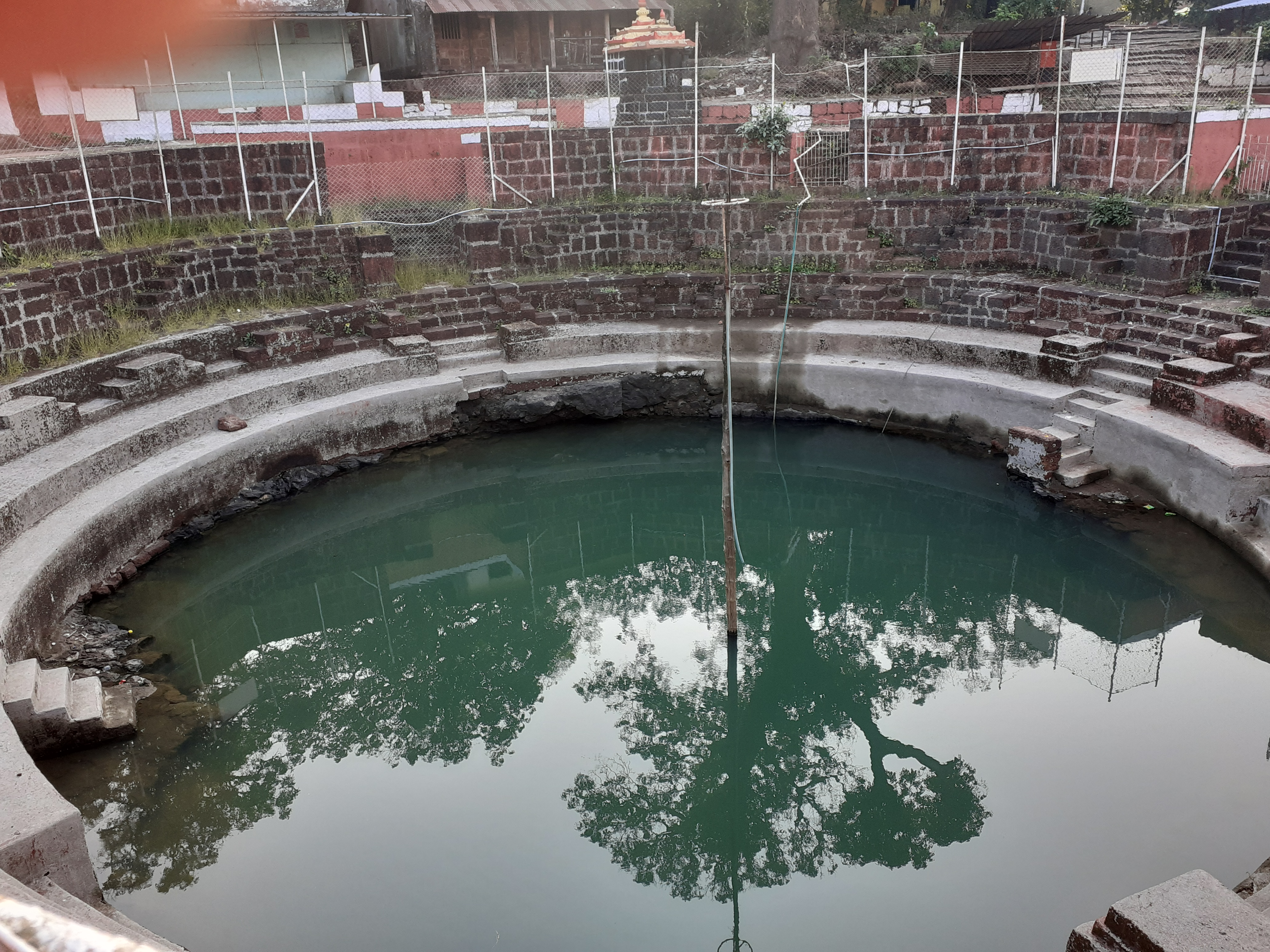
Pushkarni at Kanakeshwar

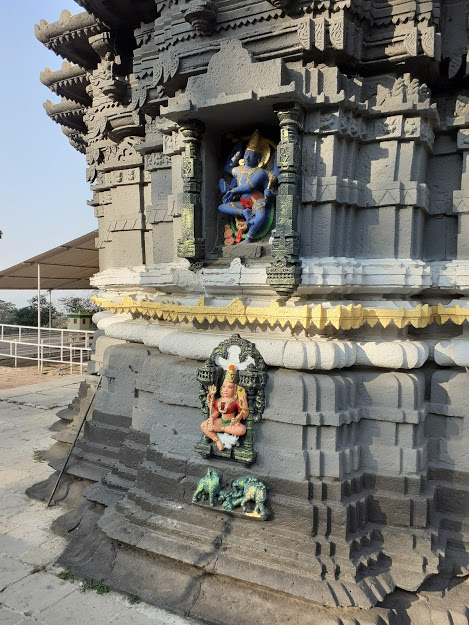
Part of the temple facing Pushkarni

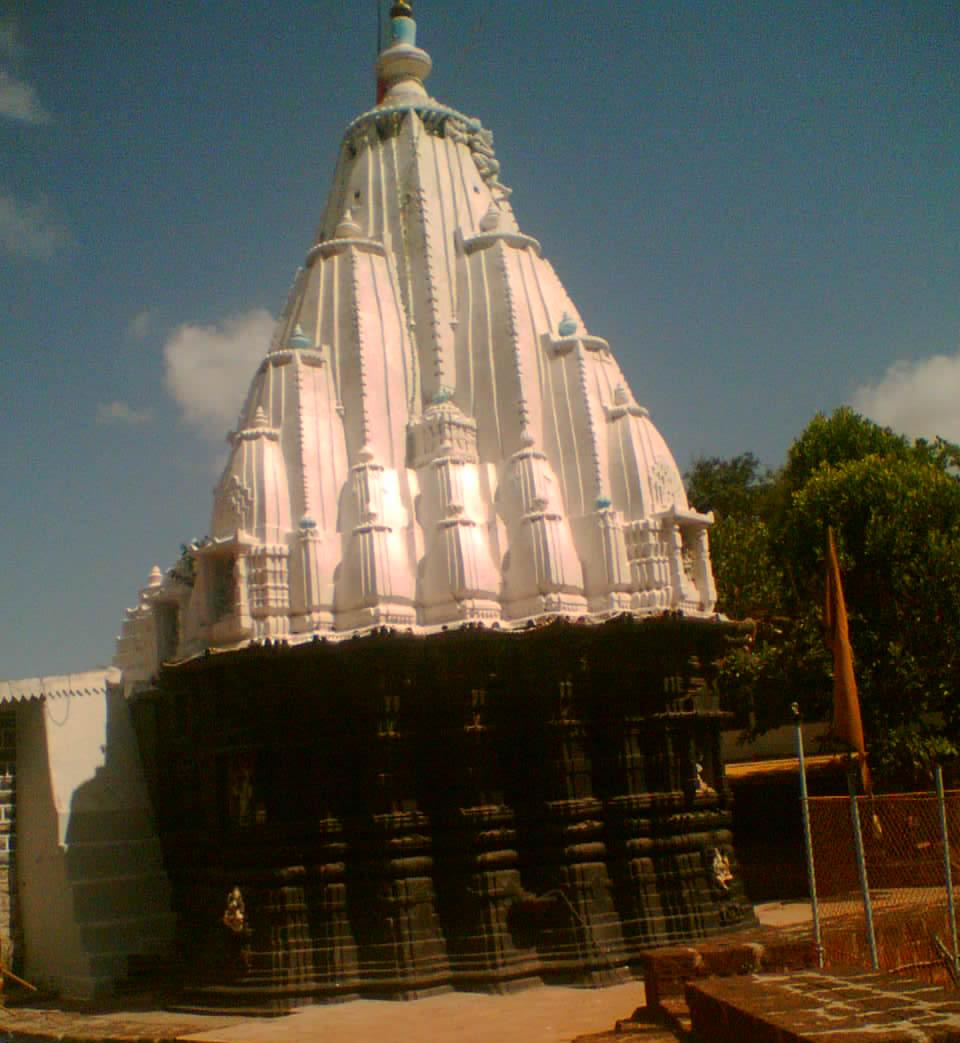
Kanakeshwar Temple

Shree Kshetra Kanakeshwar (Hindi: श्री क्षेत्र कनकेश्वर), on the Konkan coast near Alibag, is a popular place, famous for its cool climate and the old temple of Shiva. The temple is situated on a small hill near the village of Mapgaon which is almost 12 km from Alibag. The hill is almost 1200 feet high and one has to climb 650 steps to reach the temple.

The temple of Kanakeshwar is very beautiful; it is a Hoysala style structure. It has two parts: Sabhamandapa and Gabhara (Sanctum sanctorum). A water tank, called a "Pushkarni", has water almost throughout the year. The daily rituals lord Shiva are performed by Gurav family from Village Zirad. They perform rituals in main temple followed by rituals of surrounding lord Shiva temples.

While climbing from Mapgoan, in the mid of the hill one can see "Nagobacha Tappa" (a Place of Snakes) and the famous step called "Devachi Payari" named because, it is said, God himself stepped here after the construction of the temple and the steps. One can also see Gaymandi (Sculpture of a Cow), Coastline of Arabian Sea, Khanderi Fort villages nearby and Rashtriya Chemicals and Fertilizers, Thal Unit.

While climbing hill from Village Zirad, one can see the Temples of Patrubai and Sant Manamata Samadhi.

The hill and the surroundings are good to visit. One can see the hilly region and the forest on the hill. The other places to see near Kanakeshwar are the Shriram Siddhivinayak Mandir, Shri Kalbhairav Temple, Vishnu Mandir, Maruti Temple, Bramhakund, Temple of Devi Putrubai, Gaymukh and the plateau of Vyaghreshwar (a small temple of Lord Shiva), etc. One can also see stone inscription of 13th Century near Rameshwar Mandir.

Kanakeshwar is a place to feel the jungle and silence of the jungle and hills. If you want to see the beauty of the Arabian sea and the fort of Khanderi as well as the entire hilly region, then Kanakeshwar is the place to visit and rest for 2–3 days. Kanekeshwar hill supports a variety of flora and fauna, Fauna consists of variety of birds, and reptiles, It has been observed to a good breeding place for raptor birds.

Shri Kanakeshwar ( देव श्री कनकेश्वर ) is also family god/ KulaDaiwat (कुलदैवत ) of Date/ Datye family.

shri padmakshi renukda devi is consort of shri kankeshwar. padmakshi renuka temple is one of the shaktipeeth among 52 shaktipeeth which is located in alibag in shetra kawade village. kankeshwar old name is mukundeshwar .There is known as padmakshi mukundeshwara wedding.This both temple of kankeshwar and padmakshi devi is famous temple in alibag.

== Major Festivals ==
1. All Shravan Somvar and Kamalpoojan followed by Mahaprasad in Pradosha Kaal

2. Yatra on Kartik Purnima followed by Deep-prajwalan

3. Maha Shivaratri yatra, palakhi and Deep-prajwalan

4. Maharudrabhishek in month Magha and Laghurudrabhishek on Mondays throughout the year (depends on availability of Funds)

== Transport ==
Shree Kshetra Kanakeshwar is on a hill near Mapgaon village, and has main proper foot-way starting from the village. One can also reach there through foot-way from village Zirad (Zirdpada) which is on the way to Mandwa.

=== Road ===
One can reach village Mapgaon -

From Mumbai, one can reach Mapgaon by traveling on the Mumbai-Goa highway (NH-66) till Wadkhal (or Vadkhal) and taking the right fork from Wadkhal to continue on (NH-166A)– the left fork being the road to Goa. At Karlekhind, one need to take right turn to reach Mapgaon. Regular bus ply between Mumbai to Mapgaon, Alibag to Mapgaon.

One can reach village Zirad (Ziradpada) -

From Mumbai, one can reach Mapgaon by traveling on the Mumbai-Goa highway (NH-66) till Wadkhal (or Vadkhal) and taking the right fork from Wadkhal to continue on (NH-166A)– the left fork being the road to Goa. At Karlekhind, one need to take right turn to reach Kankeshwarphata. Take right turn at Kankeshwarphata and continue to travel on Alibag- Revas Road till Village Zirad. One need to take right at Zirad to reach Ziradpada. Regular bus ply between Mumbai to Zirad, Alibag to Zirad.

=== Water ===
From Gateway of India, one can reach Zirad via Mandwa by Ferry Services. Auto rickshaw services are available from Zirad to Ziradpada.

=== Air ===
The nearest airport is Chhatrapati Shivaji International Airport, about 110 km from Alibag.
