= Brihanmumbai Electric Supply and Transport =

Transport and electricity provider in Mumbai, India

Brihanmumbai Electricity Supply and Transport Undertaking

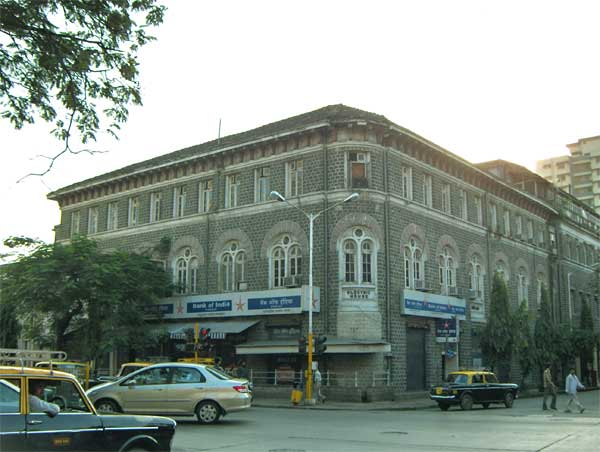
- Electric House, Colaba, headquarters of BEST
- Formerly: 1873 as Bombay Tramway Company Limited (horsecar) ---- 1905 as Bombay Electric Supply & Tramways Company Limited (BEST) (tramways and electricity) ---- 1947 as Bombay Electric Supply and Transport (BEST) (transport and electricity) ---- 1995 as Brihanmumbai Electric Supply & Transport (BEST) (transport and electricity)
- Type: Autonomous state-owned enterprise
- Industry: Public transport – Tram (1873–1964), Trolleybus (1962–1971), Bus (1926–present) ---- Electricity (1905–present)
- Founded: Mumbai (1873)
- Headquarters: Electric House, Colaba, Mumbai, Maharashtra, India
- Key people: Anil Diggikar (general manager); Ashish Chemburkar (chairman)
- Revenue: ▲₹ 2,353.4 million ($538.7m USD) (2004)
- Net income: ▼₹620.4 million. ($14.2m USD) (2004)
- Number of employees: 44,000 (2005)
- Parent: Municipal Corporation of Greater Mumbai
- Website: bestundertaking.com

The Brihanmumbai Electricity Supply and Transport Undertaking (BEST) is an Indian civic transport and electricity provider public body based in Mumbai, Maharashtra. It was originally set up in 1873 as a tramway company called Bombay Tramway Company Limited. The enterprise set up a captive thermal power station at Wadi Bunder in 1905 to generate electricity for its trams, which positioned it to also supply electricity to the city. It then re-branded to Bombay Electric Supply & Tramways Company (BEST). In 1926, BEST began operating motor buses. In 1947, the company became an undertaking of the municipal corporation and rebranded itself to Bombay Electric Supply & Transport. In 1995, it was renamed Brihanmumbai Electric Supply & Transport. It now operates as an autonomous body under the municipal corporation.

BEST operates one of India's largest bus fleets. Its service covers the entire city and also extends into neighbouring urban areas. In addition to buses, it also operates a ferry service in the northern reaches of Mumbai. The electricity division of the organisation is also one of the few electricity departments in India to garner an annual gross profit.

== History ==
=== 1865–1873: Early proposals ===
The idea of a mass public transport system for Bombay was first put forward in 1865 by an American company, which applied for a licence to operate a horse-drawn tramway system. Although a licence was granted, the project was never realized due to the prevailing economic depression in the city brought on by the end of the American Civil War, during which Bombay had made vast strides in its economy by supplying cotton and textiles to the world market. The tender was abandoned in 1871.

=== 1873–1905: Bombay Tramway Company Limited, introduction of horse-drawn trams ===
The Bombay Tramway Company Limited (BTC) was formally set up in 1873. After the signing of a contract between BTC, the municipality, and Stearns and Kitteredge, the Bombay Presidency enacted the Bombay Tramways Act, 1874, under which the company was licensed to run a horsecar tramway service in the city. On 9 May 1874, the first horse-drawn tram made its debut, plying the Colaba–Pydhone route via Crawford Market, and Bori Bunder to Pydhonie via Kalbadevi. The initial fare was three annas (15 paise), and no tickets were issued. As the service became increasingly popular, the fare was reduced to two annas (10 paise). Later that year, tickets were issued for the first time to curb increasing ticketless travel. Stearns and Kitteredge reportedly had a stable of 900 horses when tram service began.

In 1882, the municipality entered into an agreement with the Eastern Electric Light and Power Company to provide electric lighting in the Crawford Market and on some roads. The company went into liquidation the following year, however, and the market reverted to gas lighting. In 1899, BTC applied to the municipality for operation of electrically operated trams. Due to the high investment required, the company suggested that the Bombay Municipal Corporation (BMC) should waive its right to take over the tramways, which was to take place in 1901 according to the Bombay Tramways Act. Instead, the BMC decided to take over the company but was met with several legal problems. In 1904, the British Electric Traction Company applied for a license to supply electricity to the city. The Brush Electrical Engineering Company was its agent. It got the "Bombay Electric License" on 31 July 1905 signed by BTC, the Bombay municipality, and its agent, the Brush Electrical Company.

=== 1905–1947: Bombay Electric Supply & Tramway Company Limited, introduction of electric trams and buses ===
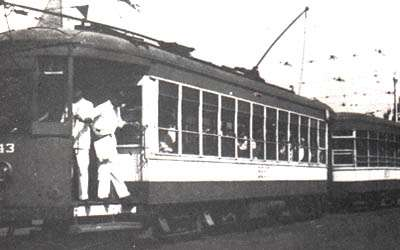
Mumbai's first electric tram, in 1907

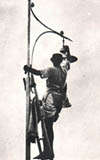
Gas lamps of the early 20th century

In 1905, the Bombay Electric Supply & Tramway Company Limited (BEST) was formed and was granted a monopoly for electric supply and the running of an electric tram service in the city. It bought the assets of the Bombay Tramway Company for ₹9,850,000. Two years later, in 1907, the first electric tram debuted in the city. Later that year, a 4,300 kilowatts (5,800 hp) steam power generator was commissioned at Wari Bunder. In 1916, the Tata Power group began purchasing power, and by 1925, all power generation was outsourced from Tata. The passing years aggravated the problem of rush-hour traffic, and to ease the situation, double-decker trams were introduced in September 1920.

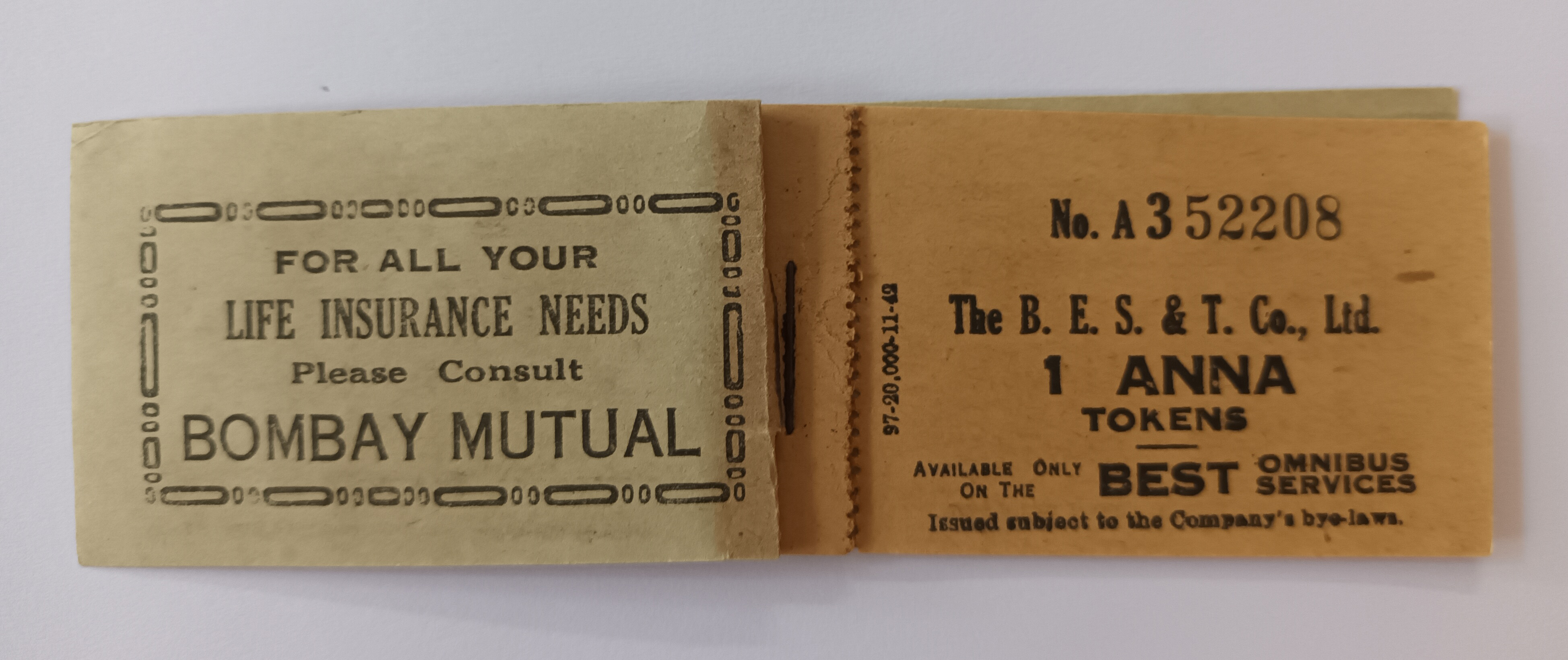
B E S & T Co. Ltd. 1 anna token booklet with advertisement of Bombay Mutual Life Insurance

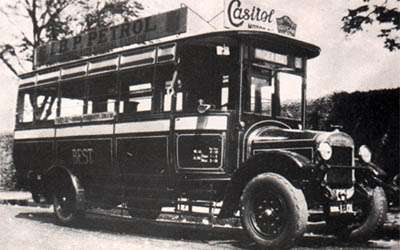
Mumbai's first bus, in 1926

Since 1913, the company had been considering starting a motorised bus service. The main factor against its introduction was the high accident rate for a similar service in London. After years of debate, the company came to a decision on 10 February 1926 to start a bus service later that year. Bombay saw its first bus run on 15 July 1926, between Afghan Church and Crawford Market. Despite stiff opposition and protests by taxi drivers, the service ran without a hitch, transporting 600,000 passengers by the end of that year. The following year, the number had increased to 3.8 million. In response to pleas by the government and the Bombay Municipal Corporation, the company extended its services to the northern part of the city in 1934. The Indian independence movement's call for mass nonviolent strikes and general civil disobedience led to regular service disruptions, causing the company to incur huge losses in 1929. The following year was a particular bad one for the company, in the wake of the Great Depression. To remain solvent, it decided to introduce discounted fares for short routes and increase its coverage to the northern portions of the city. In 1937, the introduction of double-decker buses proved extremely popular.

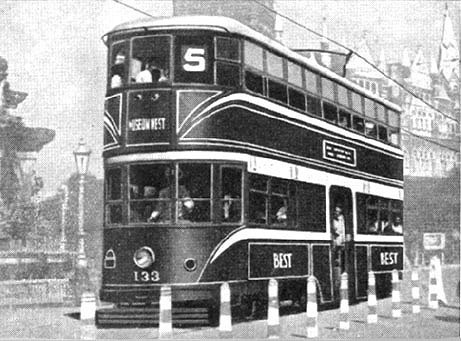
Bombay's first double-decker tram, in 1920

=== 1947–1995: Bombay Electric Supply & Transport, further expansion ===
Pursuant to the option given to it under the deed of concession granted to the Bombay Electric Supply and Tramways Co. Ltd, the BMC acquired the assets of the combined undertaking, namely the operation of tramways and distribution of electricity in the city of Bombay as a going concern on 7 August 1947. By mutual agreement, the corporation also took over the operation of bus services, which were run by the Bombay Electric Supply & Transport Company. Thus, the Bombay Electric Supply & Tramways Company was renamed Bombay Electric Supply & Transport.

As the company grew, it increased its fleet from 242 to 582 buses over the next decade. In 1949, it took over the Bandra Bus Company, which used to operate in Bombay's suburbs. In 1951, the electricity division switched over from direct current (DC) to the more efficient alternating current (AC). The company launched its services in the eastern suburbs in 1955. That year, the undertaking and private operators went to court with BEST, asking for a complete closure of the private companies. The case dragged on for four years before the Supreme Court of India granted the organisation a complete monopoly over bus services in the Greater Bombay area. In 1964, due to high operational costs and poor public support, its long-running tram services were terminated. The company became the first in the country to issue computerised billing in 1974. In 1994, it introduced electronic meters in a move to replace the less accurate electric meters.

A notable chairman of BEST during the 1970s was Kisan Mehta, who was known for his social activism.

=== 1995–present: Brihanmumbai Electric Supply & Transport, recent developments ===
With the renaming of the city from Bombay to Mumbai in 1995, the organization was rebranded as Brihanmumbai Electric Supply & Transport (BEST). Following a Supreme Court directive, the company gradually phased out old buses and introduced new ones that complied with Euro III pollution control standards. On 19 November 2004, route SPL-8, travelling from Churchgate to the World Trade Centre, began accepting cashless smart cards for automatic fare collection on BEST buses.

== Transport department ==
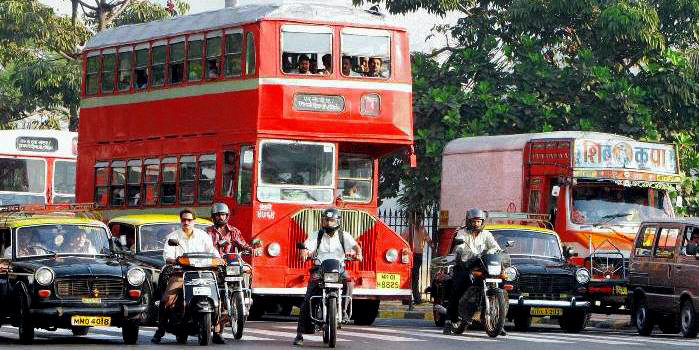
An old BEST double-decker bus

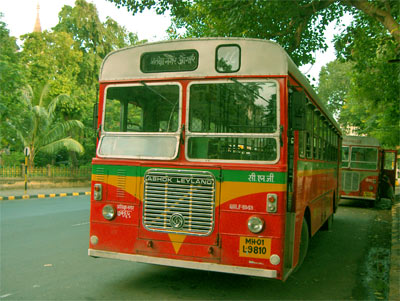
A CNG-powered BEST bus

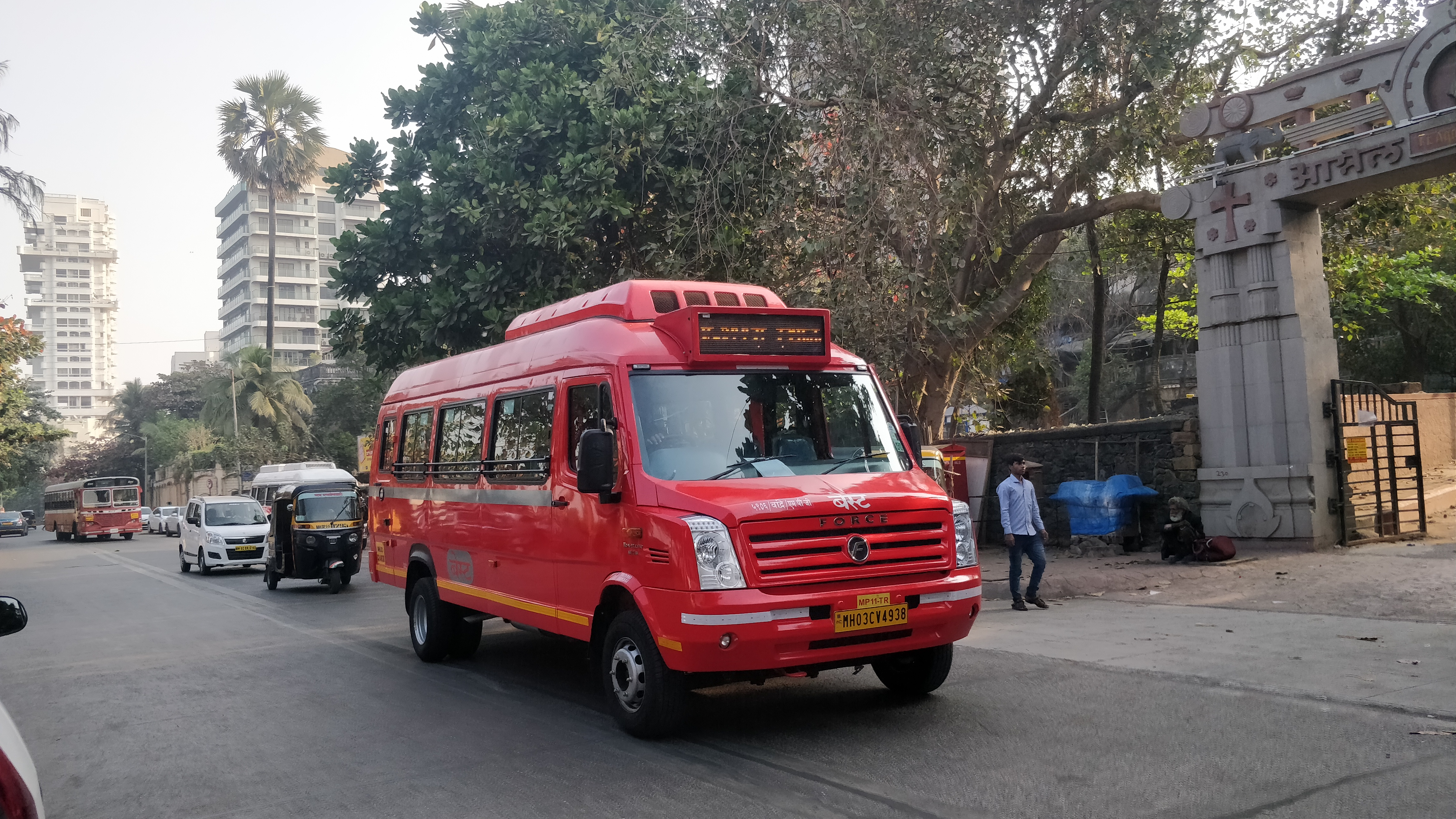
A BEST AC minibus

=== Rolling stock and depot ===
In 1936, the company owned 433 trams and 128 buses.

As of May 2023, BEST had a fleet of 3,228 buses. This comprised 525 diesel single-decker buses, 2,250 CNG buses, 406 battery electric single-decker buses, 45 diesel double-decker buses, and 7 battery electric double-decker buses. Due to the National Vehicle Scrappage Policy, under which all government-owned vehicles older than 15 years are to be scrapped from 1 April 2023, BEST's fleet would be replaced by new vehicles running on alternative fuels.

The company placed a ₹36,750,000,000 (US$380 million) order with Olectra Greentech to supply and maintain 2,100 battery electric single-decker buses for a 12-year period in May 2022. In February 2023, India's first battery electric double-decker AC bus was deployed by BEST on the A-115 route, one of 200 Switch EiV 22 models from Switch Mobility. The target was to have a fully electric fleet by 2027.

BEST also operates goods-carrying buses, breakdown vans, sightseeing and party buses, tree-cutting double-decker buses, and driving school buses for training drivers. All buses have GPS devices installed, which provide real-time information to management as well as passengers. Inside the buses, there are LED indicators displaying route and destination as well as upcoming stop names.

In April 2022, BEST rolled out the "Tap in and Tap out" ticketing system, making Mumbai the first city in India to get fully digital buses.

=== Bus routes ===
BEST bus routes are spread citywide and extend to the neighbouring cities of Navi Mumbai, Thane, and Mira-Bhayandar.

As of 2021, BEST ran approximately 3,800 buses, ferrying 5 million passengers over 443 routes, and had a workforce of 38,000, which included 22,000 drivers and conductors.

Besides buses, BEST operates a ferry service since 1981 in northern Mumbai, across Manori Creek. The barges run at regular intervals across the shallow creek linking Manori to Marve.

The BEST bus service suffered two bombings, on 6 December 2002 and 28 July 2003, killing six people altogether. In August 2006, the company introduced payphone system and CCTVs on its buses as a response to terror attacks.

=== Fares and ticketing ===
BEST has several options to pay bus fares:

- Single journey (paper ticket issued by the bus conductor and validated by ticket punch)
- Chalo App (digital ticket)
- Chalo Card
- National Common Mobility Card

Fares vary depending on the type of journey. Paper tickets are valid only for single journeys. Commuters also have the option to buy a daily pass, distance pass, and zonal pass. Students are eligible for discounts on monthly and quarterly passes and senior citizens for discounts on weekly, fortnightly, monthly, and quarterly passes.

=== BEST Transport Museum ===
The BEST Transport Museum is located at Anik bus depot in Wadala. It was set up in 1984 at BEST's Kurla depot and moved to Anik in 1993. Besides tracing the company's evolution, the museum houses mini models of BEST buses and trams.

== Electric department ==
Since 1926, BEST has been sourcing its power from Tata Power, part of the Tata Group conglomerate. Power cables are laid underground, which reduces pilferage and other losses that plague most other parts of India. The nominal rating of power supplied by BEST is 3-phase, 50 Hz, 220/110 kV. Unlike the transport company, the electricity department services only the city of Mumbai and not its suburbs.

== Labour relations and industrial disputes ==
BEST has experienced several major labour disputes involving its employees. In August 2017, around 36,000 employees went on strike, demanding the regular payment of wages, resulting in 3,500 buses staying off the roads.

In January 2019, workers went on a nine-day strike demanding a pay hike, revision of pay grade for junior-level employees, as well as the merger of BEST's budget with that of the Brihanmumbai Municipal Corporation.

In June 2026, BEST workers once again went on strike, in defiance of a temporary court order preventing them from doing so. The action affected the transport and power supply system in Mumbai.

== See also ==
- Public transport in Mumbai
- Water transport in Mumbai
- Maharashtra State Electricity Board
- Maharashtra Electricity Regulatory Commission
