= Malad =

- Suburb
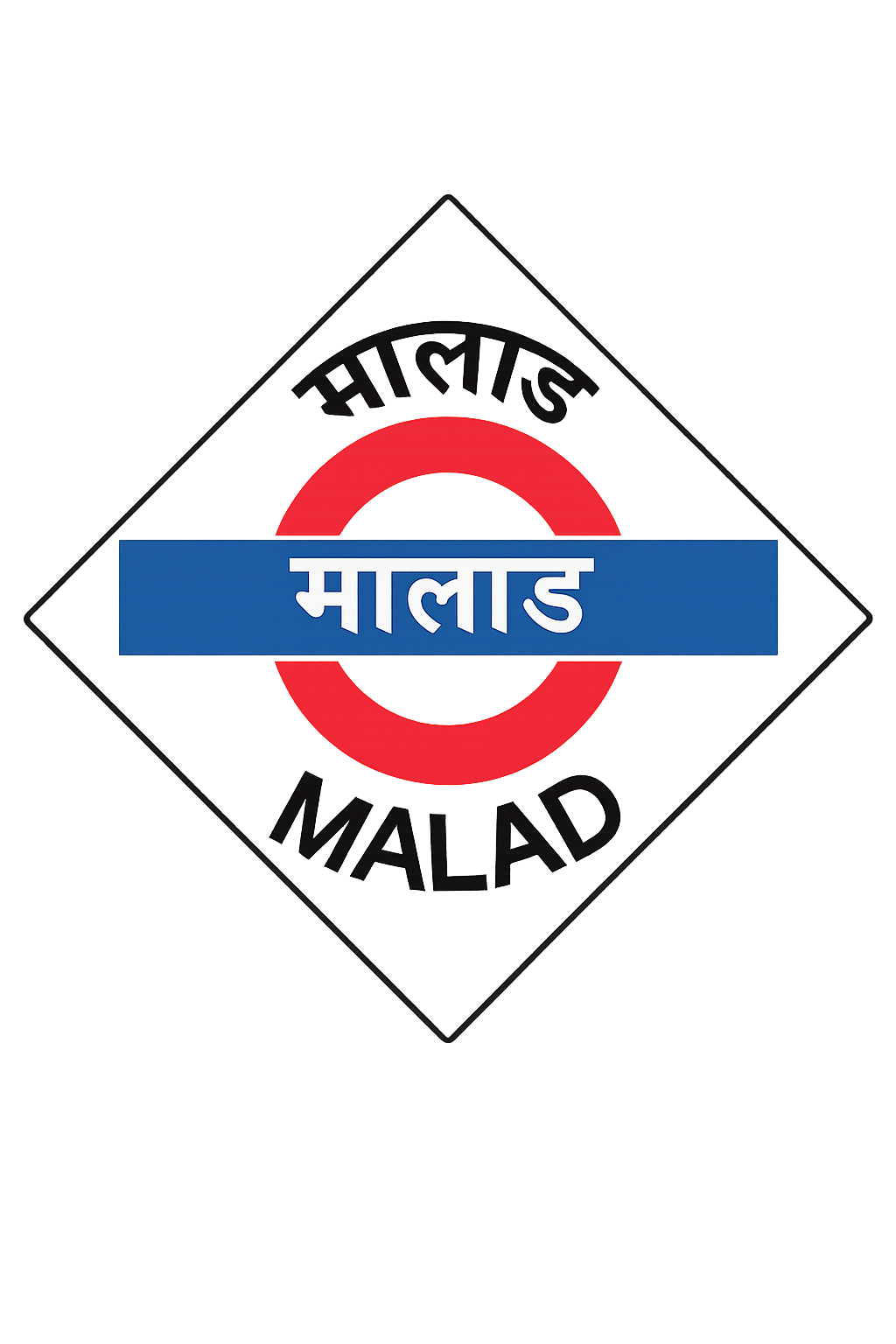
- Signage of Malad Station

- Location within Mumbai Location within Maharashtra Location within India
- Coordinates: 19.186111°N 72.848611°E
- Country: India
- State: Maharashtra
- District: Mumbai Suburban
- City: Mumbai
- Zone: D.C.P, Zone IX
- Ward: P-North

Government
  - Type: Municipal Corporation
  - Body: Brihanmumbai Municipal Corporation (MCGM)

Languages
  - Official: Marathi
- Time zone: UTC+5:30 (IST)
- PIN: 400064(West), 400095(Malvani), 400097(East)
- Area code: 022
- Lok Sabha Constituency: Mumbai North

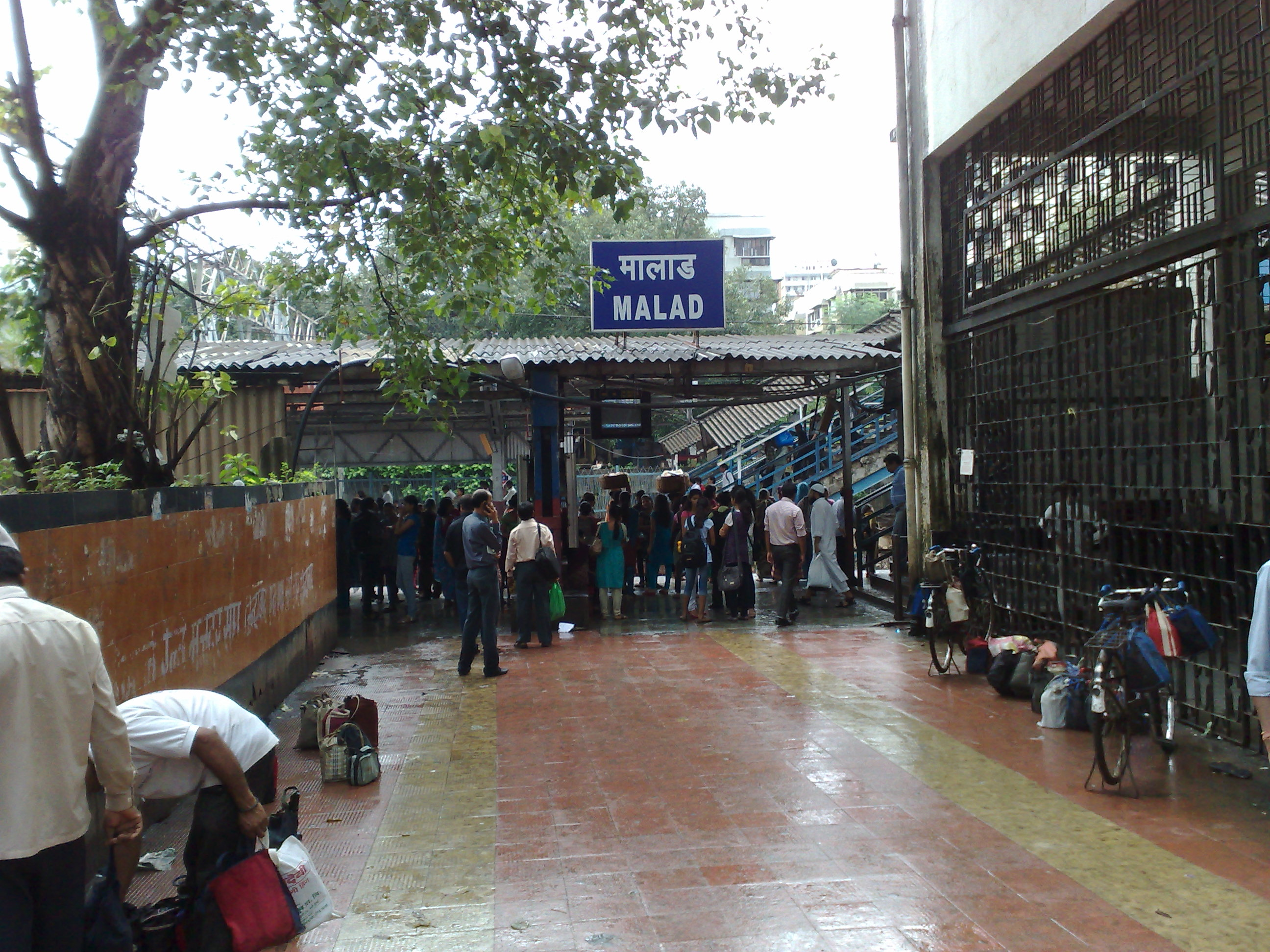
Malad Station - West Entrance

Malad (Pronunciation: [maːlaːɖ]) is a suburb located in North Mumbai. Malad has a railway station on the Western Line (Mumbai Suburban Railway) of the Mumbai Suburban Railway, lying between Kandivali station to the north and Goregaon station to the south. The railway tracks of the Western Line divide the suburb into Malad (West) and Malad (East). It has a large Marathi and Marwadi population. Also located in Malad is a prominent office and commercial space extending from the back of two prominent shopping malls: Inorbit Mall and Infiniti Mall. Marve Beach and Aksa Beach areas suburbs located in Malad.

== History ==
Malad is mentioned in the Mahikavatichi Bakhar, a 15th–17th century Marathi-language text of doubtful veracity. In fact, the text was commissioned by Nayako-rao, the revenue collection officer (Desala or Deshala) of Malad, with the objective of using genealogies to legitimize the hereditary revenue collection rights of the local officials. The text narrates the history of Malad as follows: In the 13th century, Nagarshah - the king of Ghandivi (Gandevi) - conquered the present-day Mumbai region. Three of his relatives demanded the villages of Malad, Marol, and Thane as fiefs as a reward for their good performance in this military campaign. When Nagarshah refused their demand, they allied with King Ramdev-rao (Rama-deva) of Devagiri. The area briefly came under the control of Ramdev-rao's son, Bimb-dev (Bhima), but Nagarshah's family soon regained control over it, and ruled as a vassal of the Delhi Sultanate in the 14th century.

The Mahikavatichi Bakhar further states that Soma (or Somala), the Desala of Malad, went to Sultan Alauddin's court in Delhi to resolve a dispute with another landholder named Papanrut Desala. Alauddin killed both men after a heated argument, but later felt remorse for killing the innocent Soma, and prayed for him. Meanwhile, Alauddin's wazir Nika Malik appointed Bhagadchuri (a son of Nagarshah's foster son Jaitchuri) as the new Desala of Malad, but the local people despised Bhagadchuri as an outsider. Bhagadchuri's corrupt and perverted acts, including his attempt to seduce a woman from the family of Soma Desala, made him more unpopular. Bhagadchuri later replaced the local vassal king as a subordinate of the Tughluq dynasty, and executed all his opponents, including the descenants of Soma Desala. Ultimately, a group of dissidents executed him at the Harba-devi fair on the Madh Island. Subsequently, Muhammad bin Tughluq appointed Lahur-shah - a member of the Nagarshah dynasty - as the new administrator of the area. Later, the area was successively ruled by some local families, the Muzaffarids of Gujarat, and the Portuguese.

Malad has a famous Hanuman Temple in Malvani Village constructed by Purav family belonging to SKP community of Mumbai. It's popular for its traditional Hanuman Palki Ustav which last for more than 2 days.

Ahead of Aksa Beach is the hidden and relatively lesser-known vital landmark, which is the Malad Fort a.k.a. Madh Fort. The fort overlooks the Arabian Sea and was captured by the Maratha Empire, from the Portuguese in 1739. INS Hamla, a logistics and training establishment of the Indian navy is situated in Malad.

== Educational institutes ==
- St. Anne's High School & Junior College
- Kendriya Vidyalaya INS Hamla
- Durgadevi Saraf Institute of Management Studies
- Mahindra Academy
- Lords Universal College
- Ryan International School (ICSE/CBSE, Malad)
- Seth Juggilal Poddar Academy
- Malad West School in Mumbai, Vibgyor Rise
- Nagindas Khandwala College
- Utkarsh Mandir Malad (East) and Malad (West)
- Sheth N L High School

== Beaches ==
- Marve Beach
- Aksa Beach
- Manori Beach
