= Diwiparangi =

Diviparangi
- city
- Location in Maharashtra, India
- Coordinates: 18.5555227°N 72.975719°E
- Country: India
- State: Maharashtra
- District: Raigad
- Elevation: 0 m (0 ft)

Population
  - Total: 750

Languages
  - Official: Marathi
- Time zone: UTC+5:30 (IST)

Diviparangi is a village situated in south-east of Alibag taluka in Raigad district, Maharashtra, India, on a creek of the Arabian Sea. By road the village is 16 km from the city of Alibag. Diviparangi is also referred as Divi locally.

== Palakhi procession ==
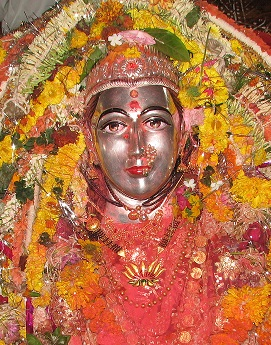
The goddess Jakhmata.

The village is famous for its temple of the goddess Jakhmata and her procession, locally called Palakhi, which is celebrated every odd year as per the Western calendar. This procession is famous in Alibaug and the surrounding area, as this is the only procession celebrated in daytime. Thousands of people from Alibag and around visit this temple on that auspicious day. It is a popular belief that wishes come true when they plea to Jakhmata.

The celebration of this procession with Palakhi of the goddess is followed by hundreds of participants in a Fancy Dress competition, group dance, bhajan, banjo and conventional drums known as dhol-tasha. The villagers of Divi actively participate in the Fancy Dress competition; there is no age bar for participation in this competition. Along with Divi villagers, people from surrounding villages and Mumbai participate in the competition.

Immersion of the Palakhi is done at the day end before sunset, in the creek adjacent to Divi. With the belief of villagers of Divi, the Palakhi is found returned and floating near the bank of Divi Creek, the next morning. This has been happening for the last many decades. Every alternate year, the Procession and Palakhi is celebrated for a day within a week after Hanuman-Jayanti (the second week of the Marathi calendar year). This time Palakhi Procession is being celebrated on [21-April-2019].
