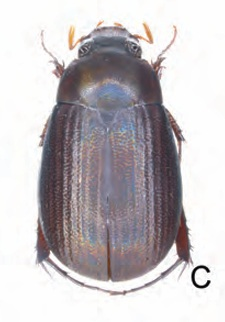

Scientific classification
- Kingdom: Animalia
- Phylum: Arthropoda
- Class: Insecta
- Order: Coleoptera
- Suborder: Polyphaga
- Infraorder: Scarabaeiformia
- Family: Scarabaeidae
- Genus: Maladera
- Species: M. alibagensis

Binomial name
- Maladera alibagensis Ahrens & Fabrizi, 2016

= Maladera alibagensis =

Species of beetle

Maladera alibagensis is a species of beetle of the family Scarabaeidae. It is found in India (Maharashtra, Kerala).

== Description ==
Adults reach a length of about 10.2 mm. They have a dark brown, oblong-oval body. The antennae are yellowish. They are dull and the dorsal surface is glabrous, except for some setae on the head.

== Etymology ==
The species name refers to the type locality, Alibag.
