= Bandra Bus Company =

The Bandra Bus Co was a transport company operated by the Bandra Municipal Committee between the late 1920s to 1949. It was taken over by the Brihanmumbai Electric Supply and Transport in 1949.
