= Marv =

Marv may refer to:

== Initialism ==
- Maneuverable reentry vehicle (MARV), a type of missile warhead
- Marburg virus (MARV), a virus of humans and non-human primates
- M.A.R.V., otherwise known as the Mammoth Armored Reclamation Vehicle, a fictional tank from Command & Conquer 3: Kane's Wrath

== People ==
- Marv Goldberg (born 1944), American writer and music historian in the field of rhythm & blues (R&B)
- Marvin Heemeyer (1951–2004), American muffler shop owner who attacked a Colorado town with a bulldozer
- Marv Johnson (1938–1993), American R&B and soul singer
- Marv Newland (born 1947), American-Canadian filmmaker who specializes in animation
- Marv Wolfman (born 1946), American comic book writer

=== Sports figures ===
- Marv Albert (born 1941), American television and radio sportscaster
- Marv Harshman (1917–2013), American college men's former basketball coach
- Marv Levy (born 1925), American football coach of Buffalo Bills and executive
- Marv Rotblatt (1927–2013), American left-handed baseball player for the Chicago White Sox
- Marv Throneberry (1933–1994), American Major League Baseball player
- Marvin Harrison Jr. (2002) American National Football League player

=== Fictional people ===
- Marv, one of the main antagonists in the Home Alone franchise portrayed by Daniel Stern in the first two films and French Stewart in the fourth one
- Dr. Kio Marv (VRAM 01k, reversed) a fictional Czech scientist in the game Metal Gear 2: Solid Snake
- Marv (Sin City), a fictional character from the graphic novel series Sin City
- Marv, a character from Crawl

== Other uses ==
- Marv Films, the name of Matthew Vaughn's UK-based production company
- Merv, Turkmenistan, also spelled Marv
  - Battle of Marv, 1510

== See also ==
- Marve (disambiguation)
