= Dahisar River =

River in India

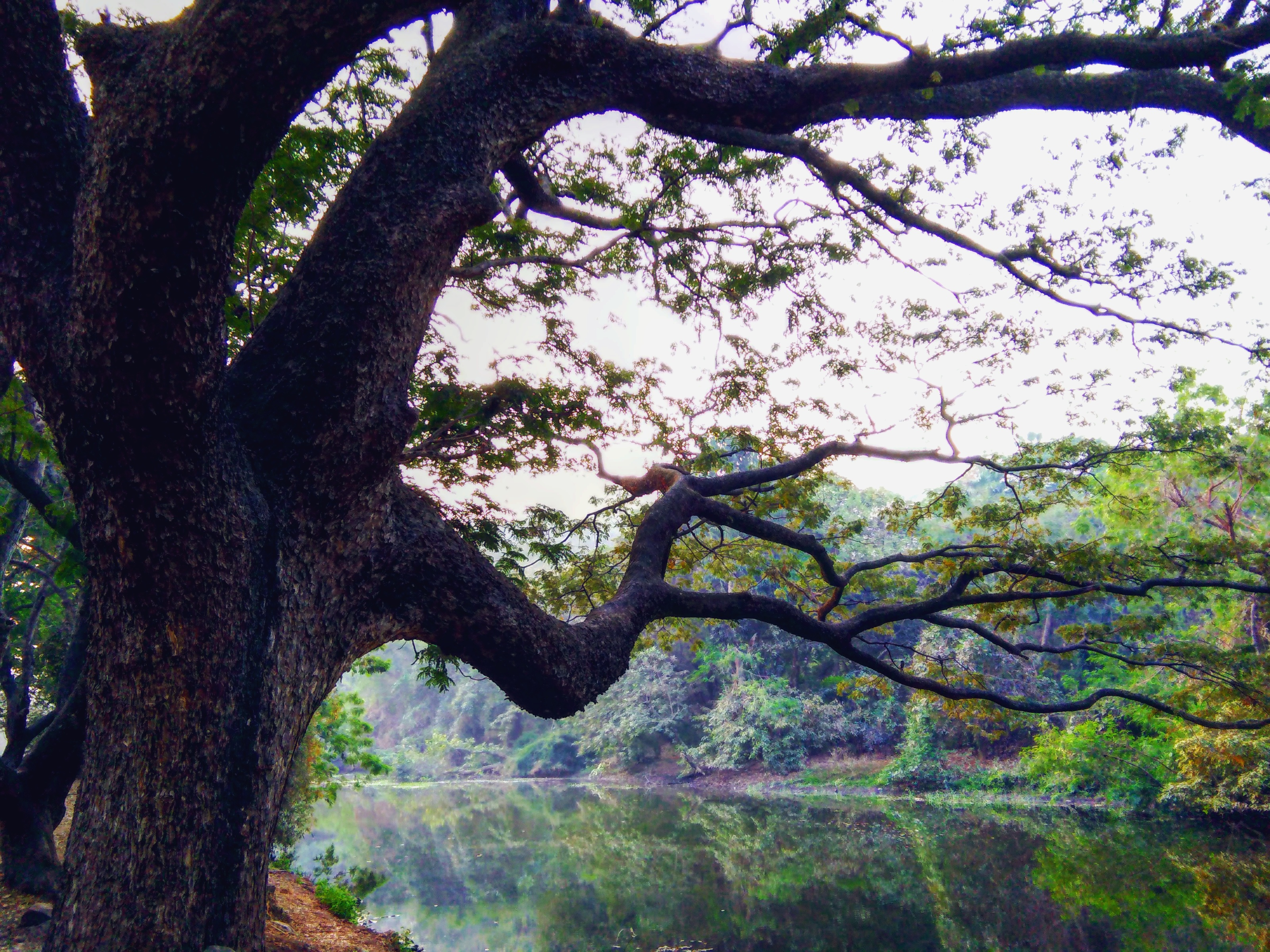

Location
- Country: India
- State: Maharashtra
- City: Mumbai

Physical characteristics
- Source: Sanjay Gandhi National Park
  - location: Mumbai suburban district, India
- Mouth
  - location: Arabian Sea, India
- Length: 12 km (7.5 mi)
- Basin size: 34.88 km^{2} (13.47 sq mi)
- Depth
  - average: 10 m

Dahisar River is a river on Salsette Island that runs through Dahisar, a suburb of Mumbai, India. It originates in Tulsi Lake in Sanjay Gandhi National Park in the northern reaches of the city. The river flows roughly north-west for a total of 12 kilometres through the national park, and the localities of Sri Krishna Nagar, Daulatnagar, Leprosy Colony, Kandar Pada, Sanjay Nagar, and Dahisar Gaothan before meeting the Arabian Sea via the Manori Creek. Its total catchment area is 3,488 hectares.

The river was once so picturesque that Hindi films were shot here. Till the late 1960s, crocodiles were witnessed to be residing in the river. The river is now highly polluted with the dumping of industrial effluents from workshops, and sewage from slums and stormwater drains. In recent times it had narrowed down, and became more shallow due to the accumulation of silt, debris and plastic bags. After the 2005 Maharashtra floods, in which more than 100 people died, the BMC has undertaken a desilting and widening project to clean up the river and prevent future flooding.

== Encroachments ==
Unregulated urbanisation has resulted in severe environmental degradation, like the narrowing of riverbanks for housing at Leprosy Colony, located between Dahisar and Borivali, and Cowsheds. The river has been frequently diverted due to dumping of construction debris, solid waste, and industrial waste in the region from Western Railway Tracks on Dahisar West up to Dahisar Bridge and dumping of solid waste generated at Stables near Daulat Nagar and areas near S.V.Road.

Encroachments on dry areas of the riverbed as well as on the banks of this river had choked and pinched the watercourse and aggravated the risk of flooding. Field observations indicated that the river also suffered from dumping of debris from construction activities, industrial wastes on the banks, and dumping of municipal solid wastes coupled with inadequate annual desilting efforts. Ingress encroachments from the banks (building, industries, and slums) as well as modification of river-course and local diversion of streams have compounded the risk of flooding. Some of the glaring encroachments are: Bridge along Dahisar River between Western Express Highway and S. V. Road, Marble Shops near the Western Express Highway, Leprosy Colony, slum pockets between Bhagwati Hospital and Rustomjee Park, and Ranchhoddas Marg.

== 2005 Floods ==
The river flood was caused by the eighth heaviest-ever recorded 24-hour rainfall figure of 994 mm (39.1 inches) which lashed the city on 26 July 2005, and intermittently continued through the next day. During the deluge, about 10,000 houses and shops in Rawal Pada, Ghartan Pada and Sri Krishna Nagar were submerged causing heavy losses. The level of water in this region was about 2.5 metres. Thousands of families living below the poverty line became shelterless overnight, losing entire livelihoods. Various locations such as Daulat Nagar, Leprosy Colony, Mhatre Wadi and Kandar Pada were completely submerged under 3 metres of water due to high tide indicating the need for tide regulatory gates at the mouth of the river. State Bank of India Staff "Vaibhav" CHS society, because of its peculiar location, was particularly affected. Most of the bungalow type of resident homes in this locality were completely submerged. Subsequent to this event, flooding of the river, although of lesser intensity, became a regular phenomenon for this location. As of March 2016, most of the original residents of this society have either sold of their property or are staying in rented accommodation, awaiting redevelopment of the property.

== Gallery ==
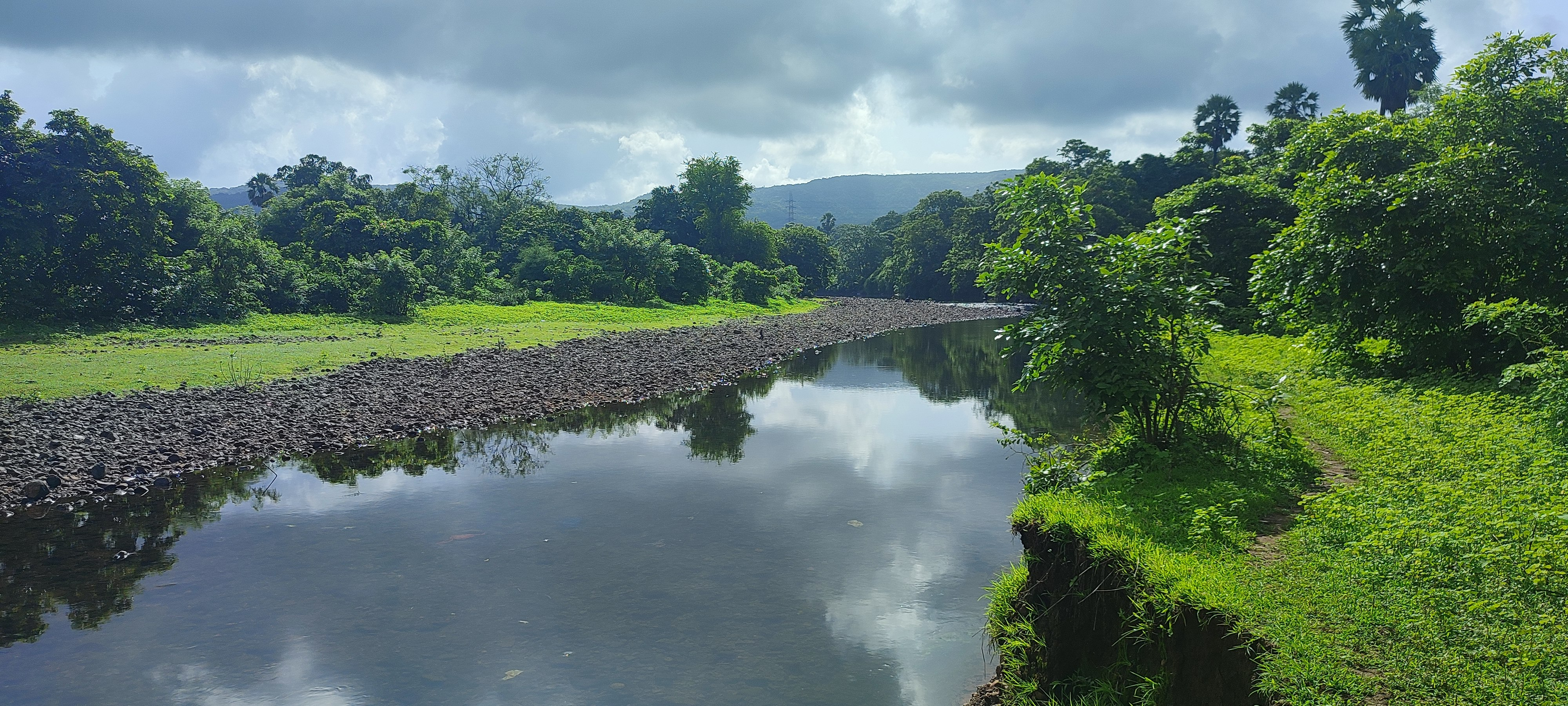
Dahisar River inside National Park

== See also ==
- List of rivers of India
- Rivers of India
