= Madh Island =

Village in Maharashtra

Madh Fort
- Versova Fort
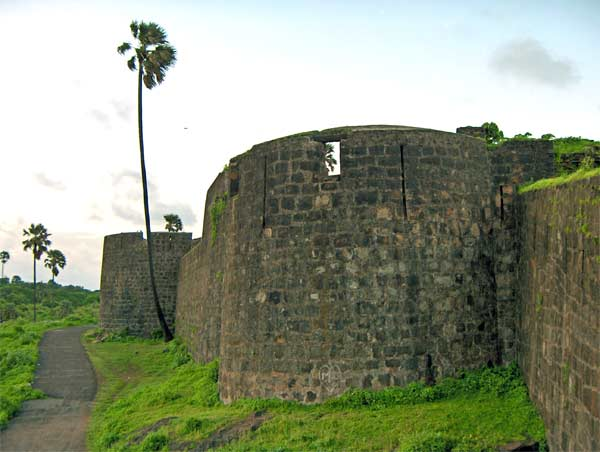

- Location within Mumbai

General information
- Type: Fort
- Architectural style: Portuguese Colonial
- Location: Malad, Mumbai
- Coordinates: 19.132283°N 72.794785°E
- Owner: Indian Air Force

Madh (Marathi pronunciation: [məɖʱ]) is a peninsular locality in the northern part of the Mumbai Suburban District, Maharashtra, India. Historically, it was an island, but land reclamations in the 20th century connected it to Malad village on Salsette Island.

== Geography ==
The former Madh Island is surrounded by the Manori-Gorai creek in the north, the Arabian Sea in the west and south, and the Versova creek in the east. The waters in the north have been reclaimed, connecting it to Malad. The area has four long sandy beaches: Marve, Aksa, Erangal and Madh. It has four major villages with same names - Marve, Aksa, Erangal, and Madh - besides smaller settlements (wadis) such as Shankar-wadi, Patel-wadi, and Pascal-wadi. A substantial part is under the control of the Indian Navy and the Indian Air Force facilities.

== Administration ==
Administratively, Madh is a village in the Andheri taluka of the Mumbai Suburban district.

== Accessibility ==
The area is accessible by bus service (#271 to Malad and #269 to Borivali) or an autorickshaw from Malad. There is also a ferry service from Versova.

== Madh Fort ==
Madh Fort is a small fort in northern Mumbai, India situated at Madh Island. It was built by the Portuguese in Portuguese occupied India. They lost it during the war against Maratha Empire when the Maratha Empire captured it in February 1739.

The British occupied Salsette Island, Thana Fort, Fort Versova, and the island fort of Karanja in 1774.

== Gallery ==
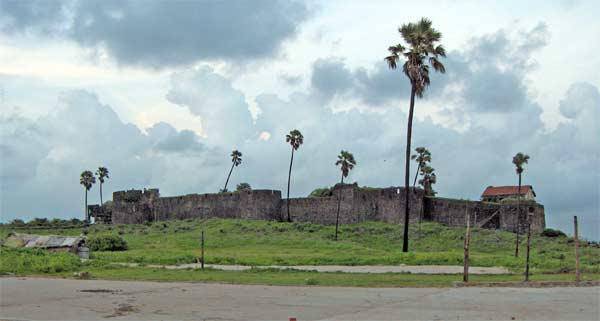
From far

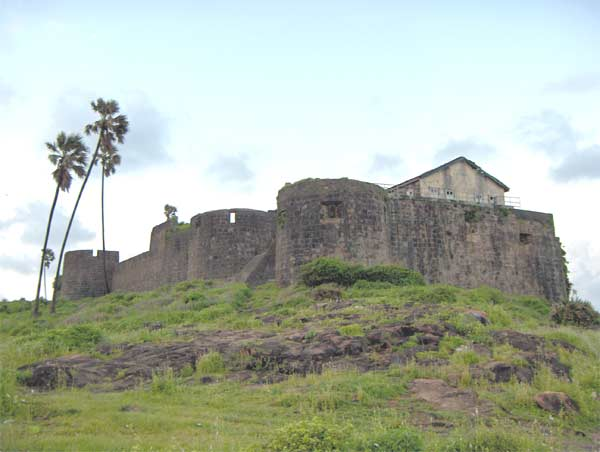
Closeup

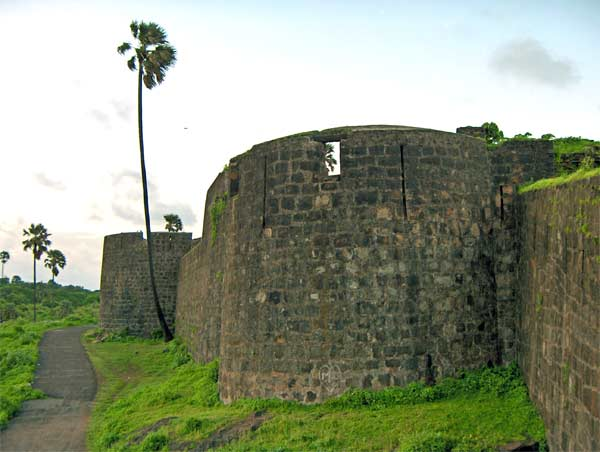
From a turret

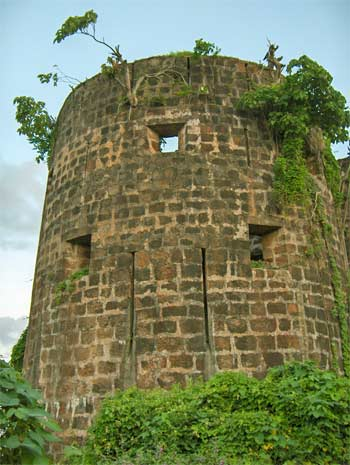
Tower closeup

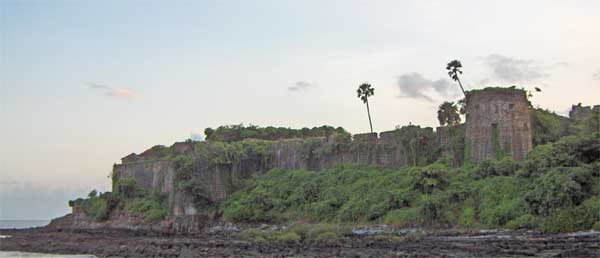
Opposite side (from Versova)

== See also ==
- List of forts in Maharashtra
- Portuguese structures in Mumbai
