= Versova, Mumbai =

Versova
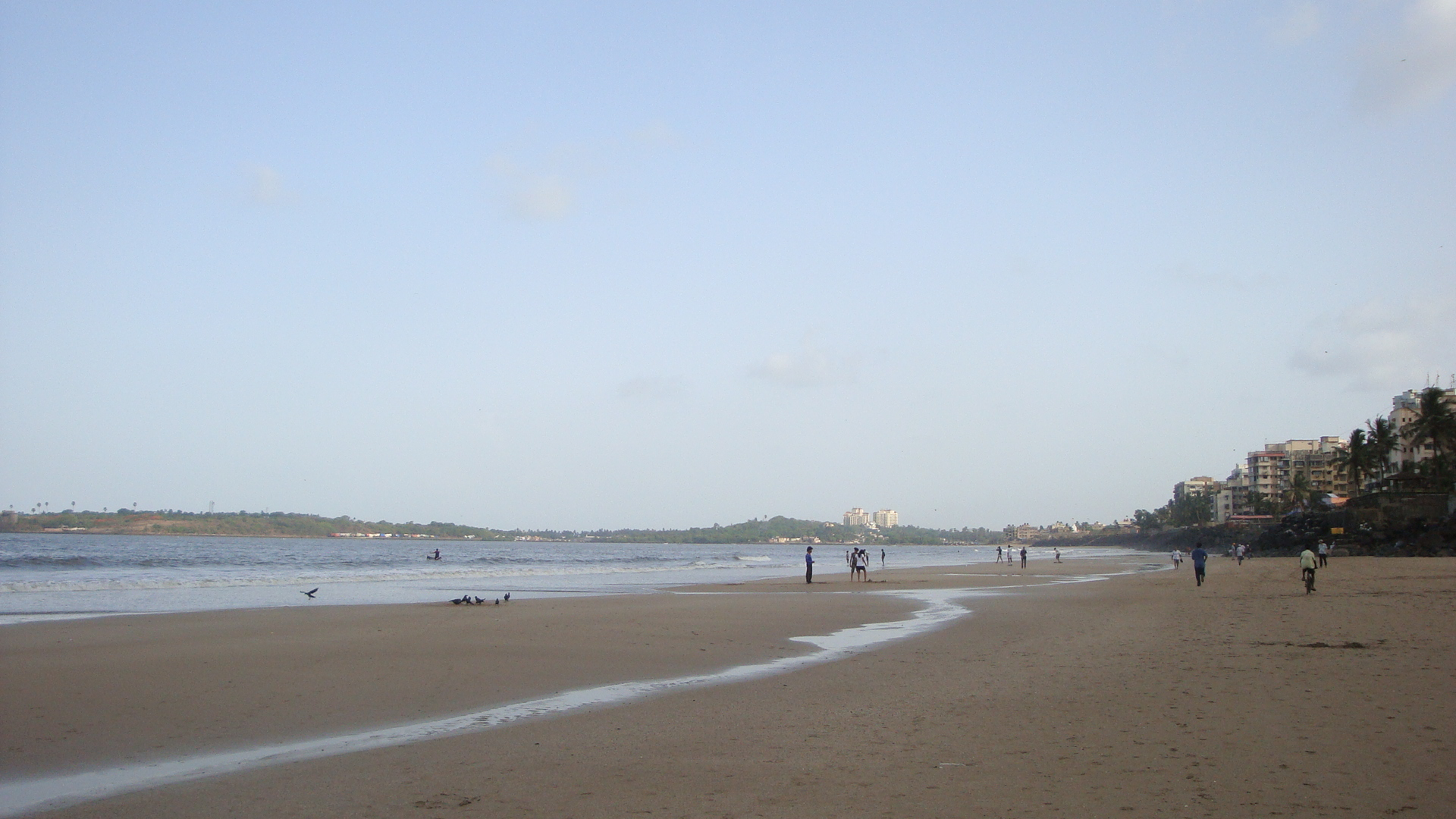
- Versova beach

- Location in Mumbai, India
- Coordinates: 19.12°N 72.82°E
- Country: India
- State: Maharashtra
- District: Mumbai Suburban
- City: Mumbai

Government
  - Type: Municipal Corporation
  - Body: Brihanmumbai Municipal Corporation (MCGM)

Languages
  - Official: Marathi
- Time zone: UTC+5:30 (IST)
- PIN: 400061
- Area code: 022

Versova (ISO: Varsovā, pronounced [ʋəɾsoːʋaː]) is an upmarket neighborhood in north-western Mumbai. It is known for its beach and the Versova Fort. The beach of Versova underwent a massive clean-up effort in 2016, labeled as the largest-ever beach clean-up.

== History ==
Versova, originally named Vesave, is a small fishing village of the Kolis, situated to the north of the old Mumbai city. The original name of the village is "Visava", which derives from the Marathi word for "rest" (as in resting place). Later, it was pronounced as "Vesava".

Versova came under the Portuguese rule in the late medieval period. The Portuguese constructed the Our Lady of Health Church in Versova, and a number of Kolis were converted to Christianity during this period. In the mid-17th century (circa 1659), driven by the growing power of the Dutch, the English East India Company considered acquiring Versova, along with Bombay or Danda-Rajpuri, as a potential station on the western coast of India.

Around 1694, a fleet of Muscat Arabs landed at Versova and massacred the inhabitants. The village is also mentioned in the writings of Gemelli Careri in 1695.

By 1720, it had emerged as a small town, with a small fort and a growing trade in dry fish. In 1739, the Portuguese lost the area to the Marathas, who strengthened the fort. A British force led by Lieutenant-Colonel Henry Keating defeated the Marathas in 1774.

In 1800, the British established a training facility for artillery and engineering cadets. However, the facility was moved to the old Bombay city after a fever epidemic affected nearly all the cadets, and killed many of them. The military establishment was completely removed in 1818. In 1875–86, the exports from the trade amounted to £34,403 and the imports in 1876–77 were worth £14,784.

Administratively, Versova (as "Varsova") is still a village in the Andheri taluka of the Mumbai Suburban district. Much of the Versova is now an urban locality, but the original settlement of the fishing community still exists at its north-west corner along the Versova creek, facing the former Madh Island. The creek has now almost turned into a sewage nullah.

== Environment ==
The indigenous population are the Kolis people. Shores of the Versova creek area are surrounded by flourishing Mangroves which support different kinds of marine life, especially molluscs, crabs and fish. The native population sells fish at Versova jetty at wholesale prices. They have their own cooperative society of Versova fishermen, wherein they manage all the fishing activities. Kolis are believed to be the oldest and original inhabitants of the land that is now Mumbai.

The Versova Koli Seafood Festival was started in 2006 to help the Koli fishing community with extra income.

== Environmental clean-up effort ==
By 2015, Versova beach had become choked with up to 1.7 metres (5.5 ft) of rotting refuse and trash—most of it plastic.

In October 2015, Afroz Shah, a young lawyer and environmentalist in Mumbai moved into the area and along with Harbansh Mathur, an 84-year-old who has since died, began efforts to clean up the beach. Eventually Shah started a volunteer organization, Versova Residents Volunteers, and encouraged volunteers to show up for weekly "dates with the ocean" – so called because of how arduous the work was. Each Sunday the volunteers would gather to remove as much trash as possible. Over the course of 21 months, volunteers removed close to 5,300,000 kilograms (11,684,500 lb) of trash, most of it plastic.

The volunteers also cleaned up 52 public toilets and planted over 50 coconut trees.

In 2016, Shah was honoured with the "Champion of the Earth" award by the United Nations Environment Programme in recognition of his vision and hard work.

In early 2018, Olive Ridley sea turtles returned to the beach for the first time in 20 years to nest and hatchlings were observed heading toward the sea on 22 March 2018.

Recently, Afroz Shah has appeared on several platforms as a champion of the cause to ban plastics and has travelled across the country to several schools in a pledge to refuse, reduce and reuse plastic.

== See also ==
- Versova Fort
- Aksa Beach
- Versova metro station
