= Mandwa, Maharashtra =

Village in Maharashtra

Mandwa
- Town
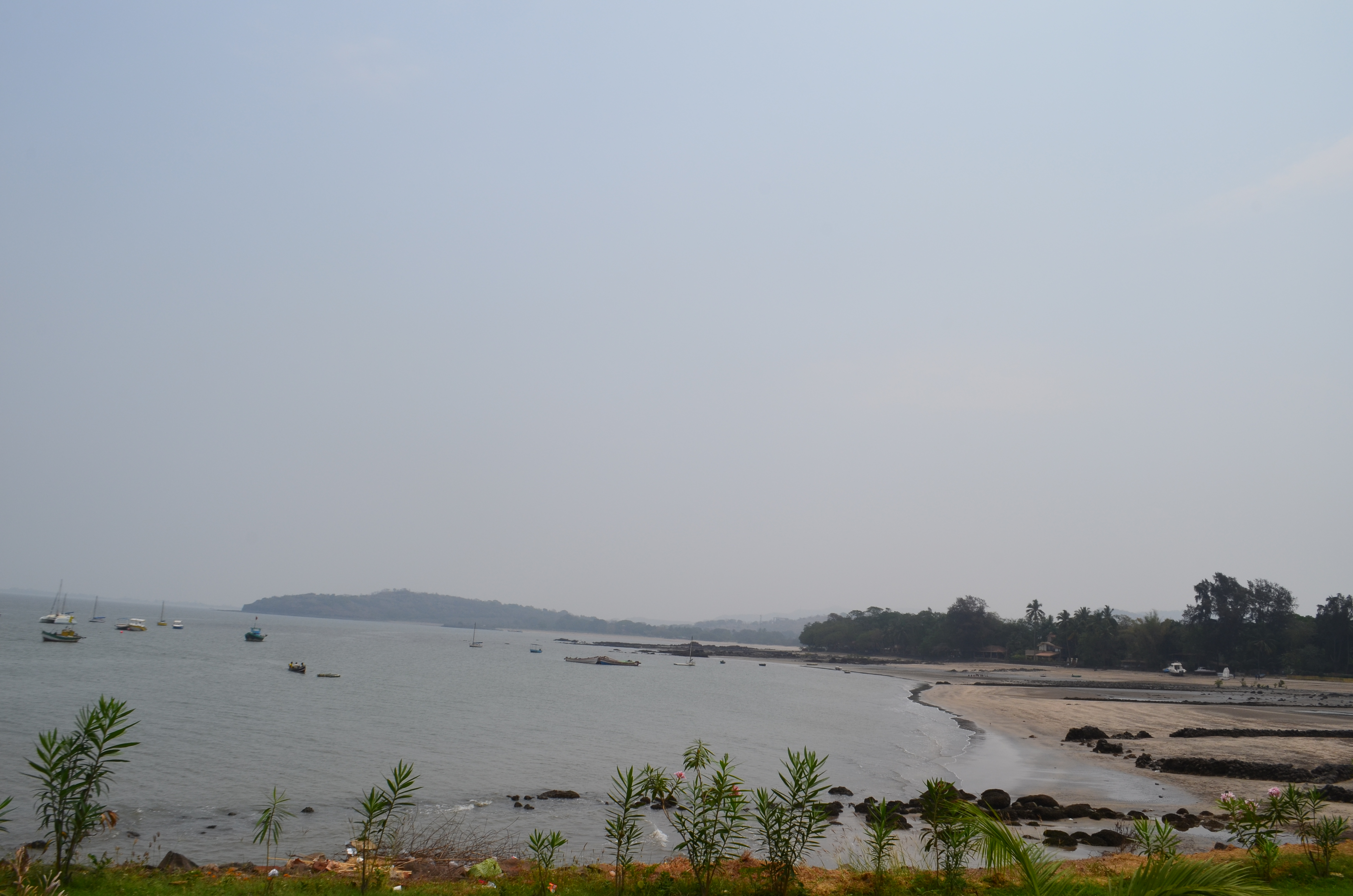
- Mandwa beach as seen from the port
- Nickname: Colaba fort
- Location within Maharashtra
- Coordinates: 18.803°N 72.882°E
- Country: India
- State: Maharashtra
- District: Raigad
- Founder: Shivaji Maharaj
- Elevation: 0 m (0 ft)

Languages
  - Official: Marathi
- Time zone: UTC+5:30 (IST)
- ISO 3166 code: IN-MH
- Vehicle registration: MH

Mandwa is a village in Raigad district, Maharashtra, India. It is popular as a weekend beach destination from Mumbai city, mainly because of the direct Ferry services available near Mandwa Beach to and from Mumbai.

In movies, Mandwa has been popularized by Amitabh and Hrithik's Agneepath series respectively.

== Transport ==
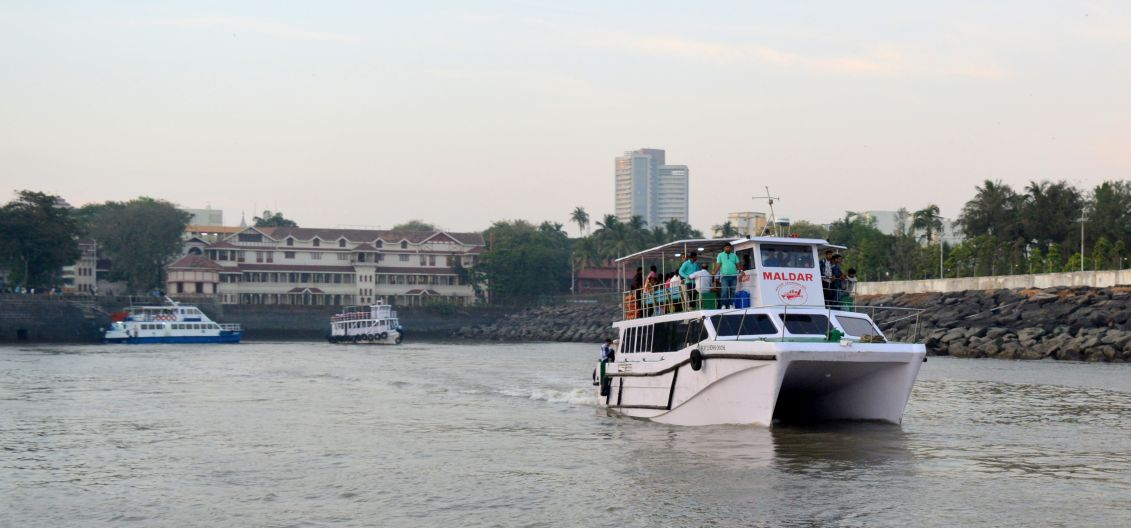
Mumbai Mandwa Ferry Ride

Mandwa serves as the changeover point for Ferry services from the state capital of Mumbai and buses bound for the district headquarters at Alibag. It is close to Kihim beach. Mandwa beach lies 6 kilometers from Rewas and close to Mandawa town.

In 2011, the Maharashtra Maritime Board (MMB), proposed to run roll on roll off (RORO) services from Ferry Wharf to Mandwa.

== In popular culture ==
- Agneepath (1990)
- Agneepath (2012)
- Coolie (2025)

== See also ==
- Mandva, village and former princeley state in Bharuch district, Gujarat state, western India.
