= Ferry Wharf =

Wharf in India

Coordinates: 18.956382°N 72.849261°E

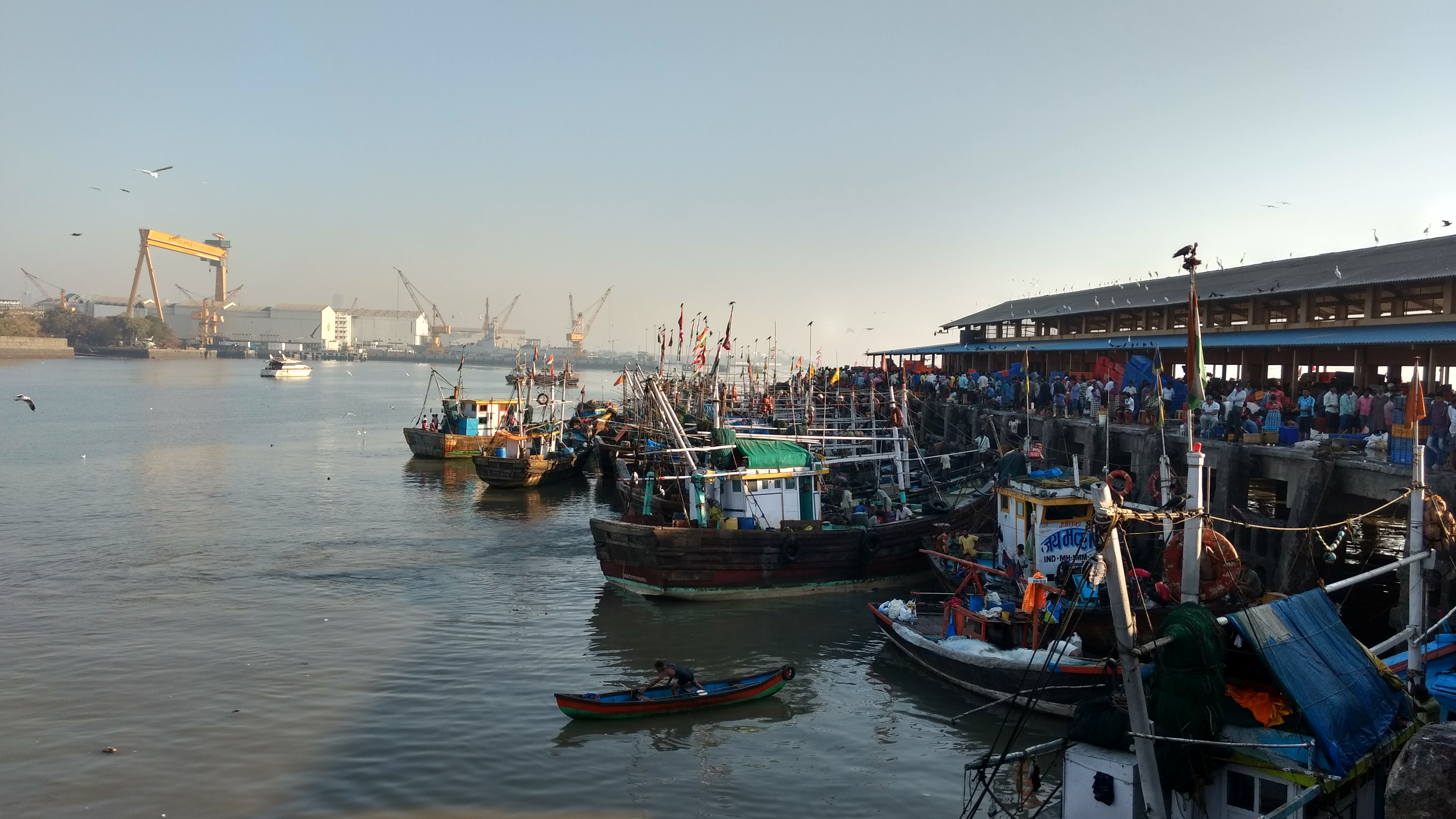
Fish Market at Ferry Wharf

Bhaucha Dhakka (also called as Ferry Wharf) is a wharf along the Thane Creek, along the coast of Dockyard Road on the Eastern seafront of Mumbai, the capital of the Indian state of Maharashtra. The wharf serves as the port for numerous fishermen who bring in their daily catch. Ferry services link up JNPT, Uran to the east, and Rewas and Mandwa to the south. The wharf is used by the students of the Training Ship Rahaman which is an institute for maritime studies on the island of Nhava.

The wharf is serviced by BEST buses and till the late 1980s also used to be the port of call for the Mumbai-Goa ferry services. The nearest railway station is Dockyard Road on Harbour Line services of Central Railway. Local trains towards Bandra, Andheri, Vashi, Belapur, Panvel halt at this station. These trains originate from CSMT that is Chhatrapati Shivaji Maharaj Terminus.

== History ==
Information given in the Govt. Archives and in the Marathi book ‘Pathare Prabhuncha Itihaas’ by Pratap Velkar reveal that Mumbai did not have a regular pier or wharf till 1835 for either goods or passengers. The government started leasing out land on the Bombay frontage to private individuals to build wet docks and basins. Lakshman Harishchandrajee Ajinkya (1789–1858) alias ‘Bhau’ was the first local to take this opportunity. He constructed Mumbai's first wet dock in 1841 for the convenience of the passengers and incoming ships to load, embark and berth. Ild bhaucha dhakka was at Alexzandra dock. it was It was shifted to current location at princess dock in 1969. Today, the passenger terminal at the Bhau-Cha-Dhakka is still used to ferry people to Mora and Rewas for their onward journeys to Uran and Alibag.

=== Lakshman Harishchandraji Ajinkya "Bhau" ===
He belonged to the Pathare Prabhu community (one of the original inhabitants of Mumbai). He started as Chief Clerk in the Gun Carriage Factory in Colaba and raised himself to be a major contractor building docks with help of one Captain Russel. His family had estates at Naigaum and Parel.He also built Carnac and Claire bunders.
