= Marvé Beach =

- Suburb
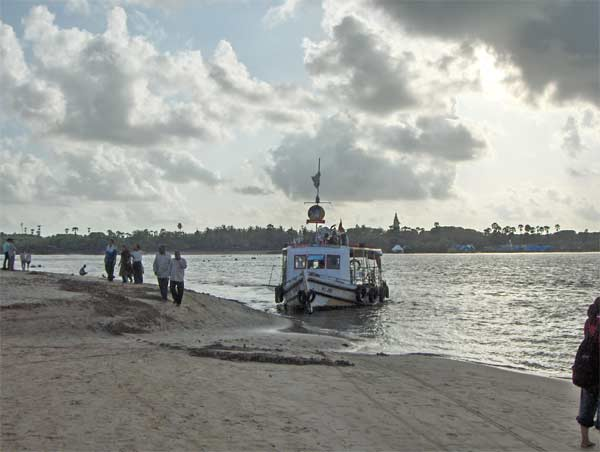
- Marve Beach with ferry

- Location within Mumbai Location within Maharashtra Location within India
- Coordinates: 19.1973°N 72.7968°E
- Country: India
- State: Maharashtra
- District: Mumbai Suburban
- City: Mumbai

Government
  - Type: Municipal Corporation
  - Body: Brihanmumbai Municipal Corporation (MCGM)

Languages
  - Official: Marathi,
- Time zone: UTC+5:30 (IST)
- PIN: 400095
- Area code: 022

Marve Beach (Pronunciation: [maːɾʋe]) is located in the western suburb of Malad in the city of Mumbai, India.

Marathi is the most spoken language in this region. East Indian community, Panchkalshi or Somvanshi Kshatriya Pathare (SKP) and Koli's are the native people of this area.

== Details ==
Ferry Services to the Essel World and Water Kingdom Amusement Parks and Manori are available at its north end. Ferry service to Manori is provided by BEST. You can also carry your two-wheelers onto the Ferry to Manori Island. Marve beach may be reached from Malad Railway Station (West side) by BEST bus no 272. Auto-rickshaws and taxis are available round the clock. With recent permissions being granted by the government, the site is now witnessing the construction of a Manori to Marve sea link.

Movement on Marve beach is restricted due to its narrow width as well as presence of Indian Naval base, INS Hamla. The beach is not safe for swimming due to presence of very swift currents and sinking sand.

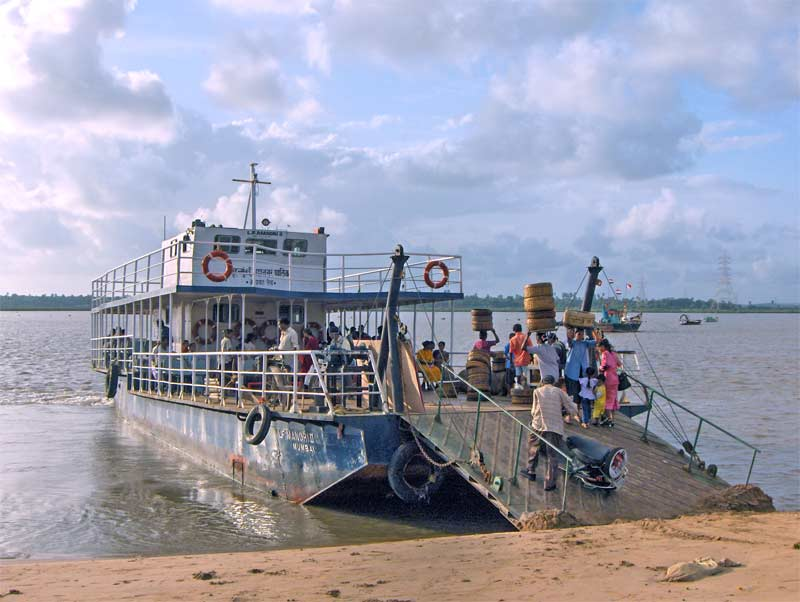
BEST ferry to Manori

== History ==
The strip of land from Aksa Beach to Marve used to be one of many islands that lay off the Salsette west coast. These islands seem to have remained separate till as late as 1808. At the time of writing of the old Gazetteer of Thana in 1882, these islands could be reached during low tides by walking across the tidal inlets in between.
