= Marve (surname) =

Marve is a surname. Notable people with the surname include:

- Chris Marve (born 1989), American football player and coach
- Eugene Marve (1960–2021), American football player
- Robert Marve (born 1989), American football player, son of Eugene
