= Aksa Beach =

- Suburb
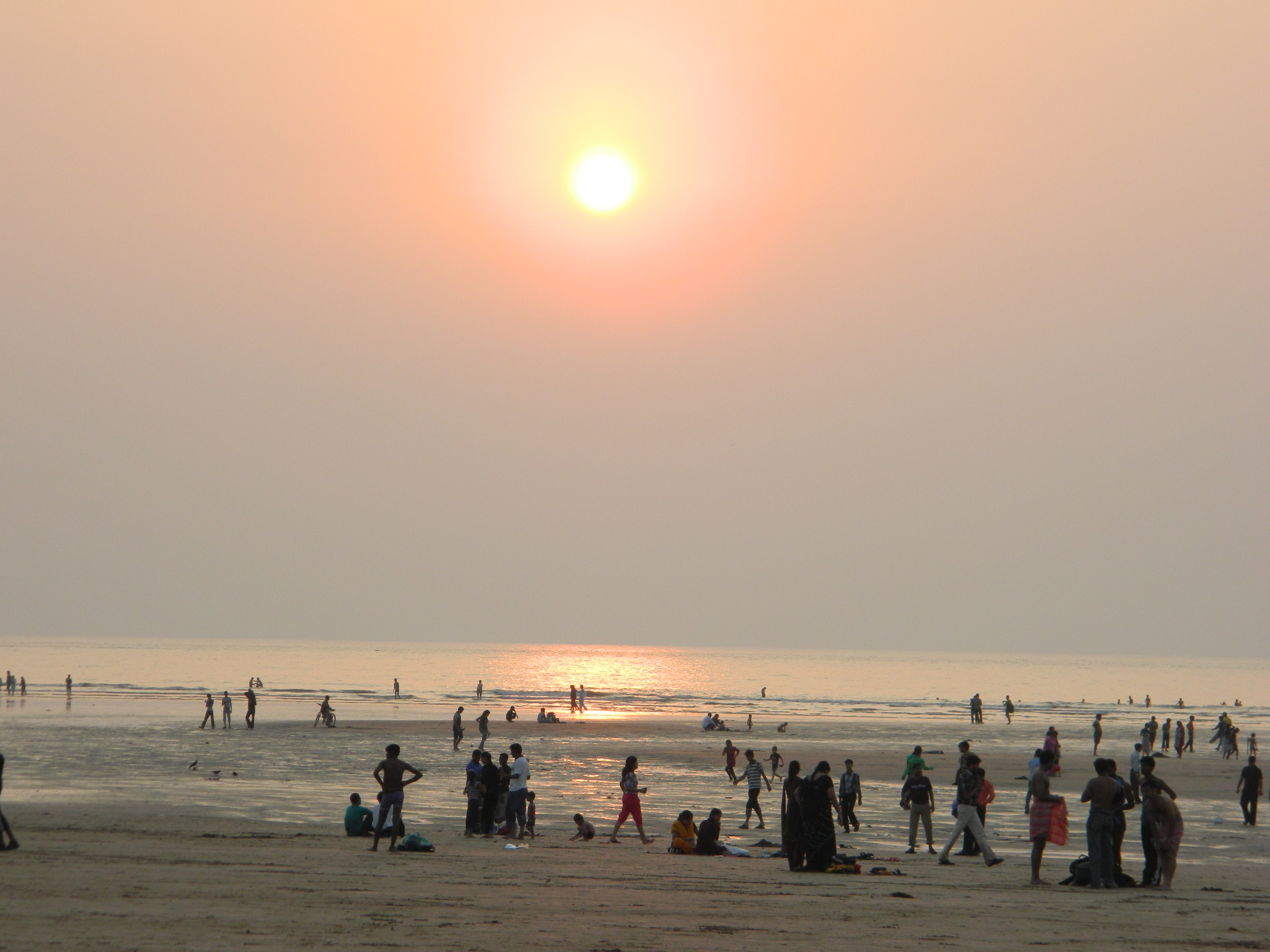
- Aksa beach, Mumbai

- Location within Mumbai Location within Maharashtra Location within India
- Coordinates: 19.1760°N 72.7954°E
- Country: India
- State: Maharashtra
- District: Mumbai Suburban
- City: Mumbai

Government
  - Type: Municipal Corporation
  - Body: Brihanmumbai Municipal Corporation (MCGM)

Languages
  - Official: Marathi, English, Hindi
- Time zone: UTC+5:30 (IST)
- Area code: 022

Aksa Beach is a popular beach and vacation spot in Aksa village, Malad, Mumbai, India. It is situated close to Marvé Beach. It is a popular weekend destination, dotted with many private cottages and hotels, some of which are rented out to tourists and visitors. Aksa Beach also happens to be one of the cleanest beaches in the city of Mumbai.

Marathi is the most spoken language in this region. The East Indian community, Panchkalshi or Somvanshi Kshatriya Pathare (SKP), and Koli's are the native people of this area.

This beach has INS Hamla (a base of the Indian Navy) at one end and a small beach called "Dana Paani" at the other.

== Safety ==
It is not safe to swim, as the currents are strong, and the sands of the beach keep shifting because of the waves, and people often misjudge them. Warning signs of swimming prohibition have been put on the beach, and lifeguards have been appointed: however, accidents are common due to rapidly changing tides, and the merging to two tide currents on the rocky beach and people ignoring warning. The beach gets even more dangerous during monsoon season, though 15,000 people visit the beach during weekends. Quicksand is also found in the waters, often causing danger.

== Drowning incidents ==
Aksa Beach, located in Mumbai, India, has been identified as one of the beaches with the highest number of drowning incidents. Records indicate that between 2006 and 2018, an average of 38 people drowned every year due to drowning incidents, while 445 individuals were rescued after near-drowning experiences and 45 lost their lives during 2006-2018. In total, 15 drowning spots have been identified along the beach, with the highest number of incidents occurring in 2007. Pre-monsoon season, which coincides with the peak summer vacation period, is when the beach sees the greatest number of incidents, owing to the large crowds that gather there.

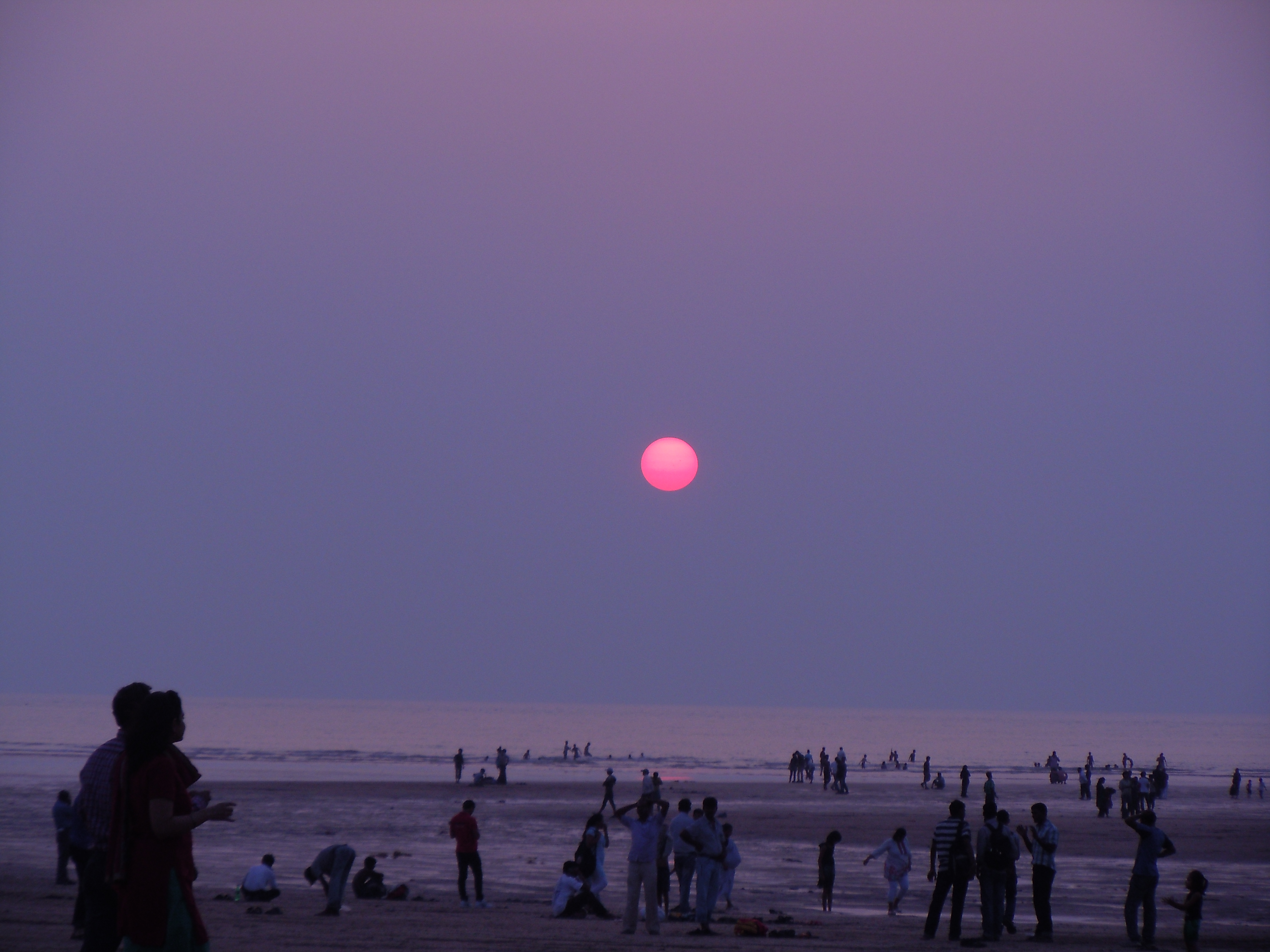
Sunset at the Aksa Beach

== See also ==
- Marvé Beach
- Juhu Beach
- Dana pani Beach
