= Alibag =

City in Maharashtra, India

Alibag Alibaug
- Coastal City; Mumbai Metropolitan Region
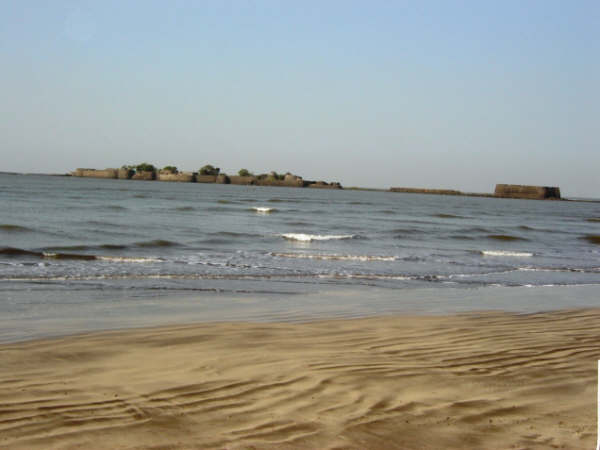
- Alibag sea beach

- Location within Maharashtra
- Coordinates: 18.64°N 72.88°E
- Country: India
- State: Maharashtra
- District: Raigad
- Taluka: Alibag

Government
  - President Alibag Municipal Council: Prashant Naik
  - Vice President Alibag Municipal Council: Mansi Mhatre
  - Chief Officer Alibag Municipal Council: Dr Sachin bachchhaw
- Elevation: 0 m (0 ft)

Population (2011)
  - Total: 20,743
- Demonyms: Alibagkar, Alibaugkar

Languages
  - Native: Marathi
  - Official: Marathi
- Time zone: UTC+5:30 (IST)
- Postal Index Number: 402 201
- Telephone code: 02141
- Climate: Tropical savanna climate

Alibag (pronounced [əlibaːɡ]), also known as Alibaug, is a coastal city and a municipal council in the Raigad district of Maharashtra, India. It is the headquarters of the Raigad district, and is south of the city of Mumbai. Alibag is part of the Mumbai Metropolitan Region and is situated at a distance of about 96 kilometres (60 mi) from Mumbai and 143 kilometres (89 mi) from Pune.

Alibag is a holy place for Padmakshi Renuka, who is also known as the goddess of Konkan.

== History ==
Alibag was founded in the 17th century by the Admiral of the Maratha Navy, Kanhoji Angre.

Alibag and its surrounding villages are the historic hinterlands of the Bene Israel Jews. According to Indian Jewish historian Esther David, Jews arrived in the region over 2000 years ago, escaping persecution from the Roman Empire, when their ship wrecked here. As they got into the business of oil-pressing and plantations, continued practising Sabbath, and took holidays on Saturday, they came to be known as Shanivar-Telis ('Saturday–Oilpeople'). There is a synagogue named Magen Aboth Synagogue in the "Israel Alley" area of the town.

== Etymology ==
A Bene Israelite named Eli (Elisha/Elizah) used to live there at that time and owned many plantations of mangoes and coconuts in his gardens. The natives started calling the place "Eli cha Bagh"(which means "Eli's garden") and in the subsequent generations the pronunciation changed to simply "Alibag", and the name stuck.

== Geography ==
Alibag is located about 120 km south of Mumbai, at 18°38′29″N 72°52′20″E. The average elevation is 0 metres. The district government offices are located along the seacoast road.

== Demographics ==
As of the 2001 India census, Alibag had a population of 19,491. Males constitute 52% of the population and females 48%. Alibag has an average literacy rate of 79%, higher than the national average of 59.5%; with 54% of males and 46% of females' literate, 11% of the population is under 6 years of age. 75% of the population speaks the Marathi language.

As of the 2011 census, Alibag had a population of 20,743, of which 10,646 are males while 10,097 are females, and 17,431 were educated, with a literacy rate of 84%.

Religion in Alibag (2011)
Religion	Percent
Hinduism	82.55%
Islam	11.06%
Buddhism	3.19%
Jainism	2.42%
Christianity	0.44%
Others	0.34%

== Climate ==
Climate data for Alibag (1991–2020, extremes 1933–2012)
Month	Jan	Feb	Mar	Apr	May	Jun	Jul	Aug	Sep	Oct	Nov	Dec	Year
Record high °C (°F)	36.0 (96.8)	38.5 (101.3)	40.1 (104.2)	40.0 (104.0)	39.6 (103.3)	37.2 (99.0)	36.5 (97.7)	33.6 (92.5)	34.9 (94.8)	38.1 (100.6)	37.9 (100.2)	36.1 (97.0)	40.1 (104.2)
Mean daily maximum °C (°F)	29.1 (84.4)	29.5 (85.1)	31.0 (87.8)	32.3 (90.1)	33.6 (92.5)	32.1 (89.8)	30.3 (86.5)	30.0 (86.0)	30.6 (87.1)	32.9 (91.2)	33.4 (92.1)	31.2 (88.2)	31.3 (88.3)
Mean daily minimum °C (°F)	17.6 (63.7)	18.6 (65.5)	21.2 (70.2)	24.1 (75.4)	26.7 (80.1)	26.1 (79.0)	25.5 (77.9)	25.2 (77.4)	24.6 (76.3)	23.9 (75.0)	21.6 (70.9)	18.9 (66.0)	22.9 (73.2)
Record low °C (°F)	9.4 (48.9)	11.2 (52.2)	14.1 (57.4)	17.6 (63.7)	21.7 (71.1)	20.5 (68.9)	19.5 (67.1)	20.4 (68.7)	21.0 (69.8)	16.2 (61.2)	14.5 (58.1)	12.7 (54.9)	9.4 (48.9)
Average rainfall mm (inches)	0.6 (0.02)	0.1 (0.00)	0.1 (0.00)	0.2 (0.01)	11.9 (0.47)	573.3 (22.57)	801.0 (31.54)	530.1 (20.87)	388.3 (15.29)	86.5 (3.41)	9.6 (0.38)	7.2 (0.28)	2,408.8 (94.83)
Average rainy days	0.0	0.0	0.1	0.0	0.9	15.2	22.3	20.3	13.7	4.0	0.4	0.3	77.3
Average relative humidity (%) (at 17:30 IST)	62	63	65	70	72	80	84	83	79	70	65	63	71
Source: India Meteorological Department

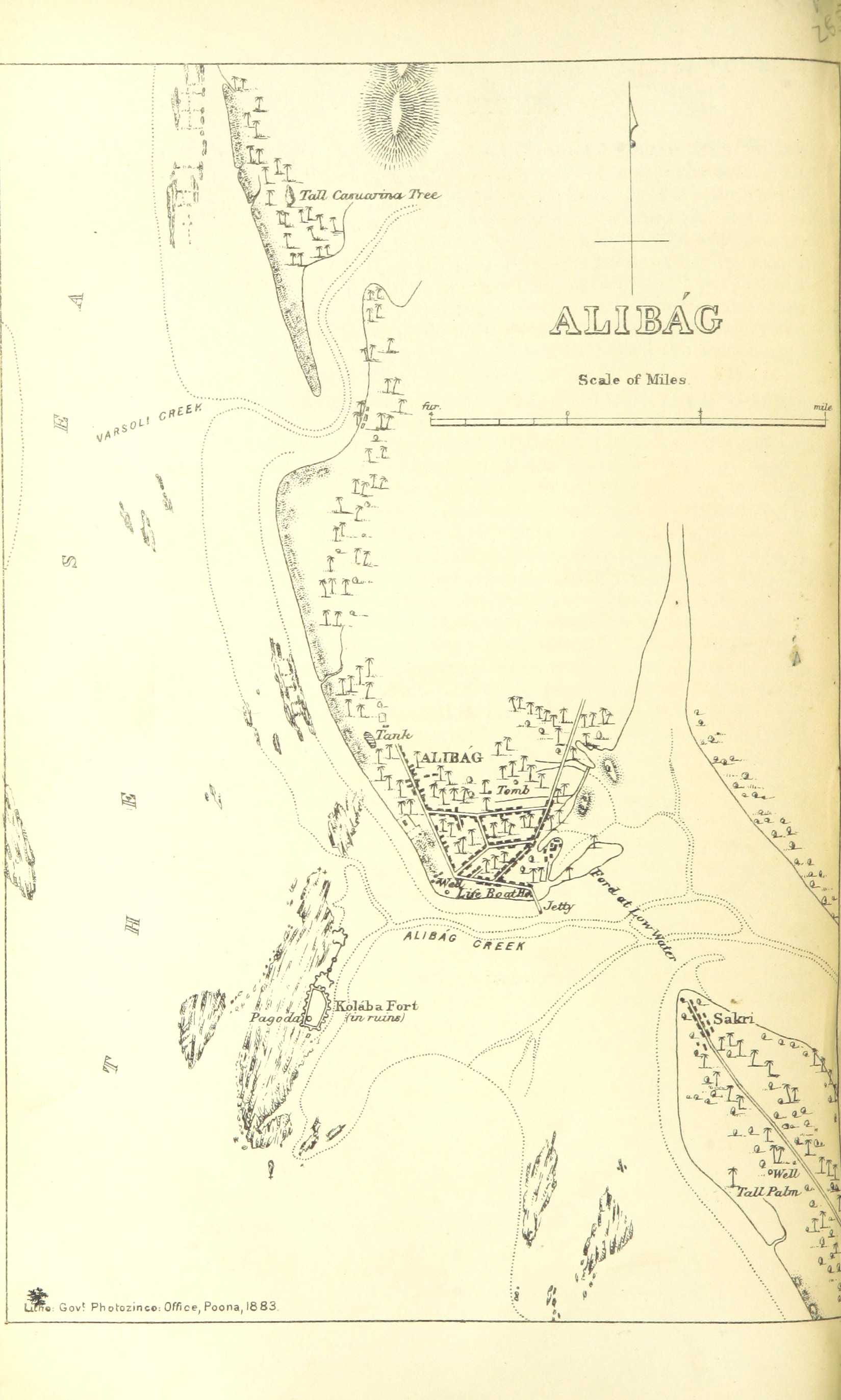
Alibag 1896

== Cyclones ==
In November 2009, Cyclone Phyan made landfall in the city. Damage to property was reported in the districts of Ratnagiri, Raigad, Sindhudurg, Thane, and Palghar. Eleven years later, in early June 2020, severe cyclonic storm Nisarga made landfall in Alibag at peak intensity. The cyclone blew off tin and asbestos sheets from roofs and uprooted trees in Alibag. Several trees fell on houses.

== Places of interest ==
=== Historical ===
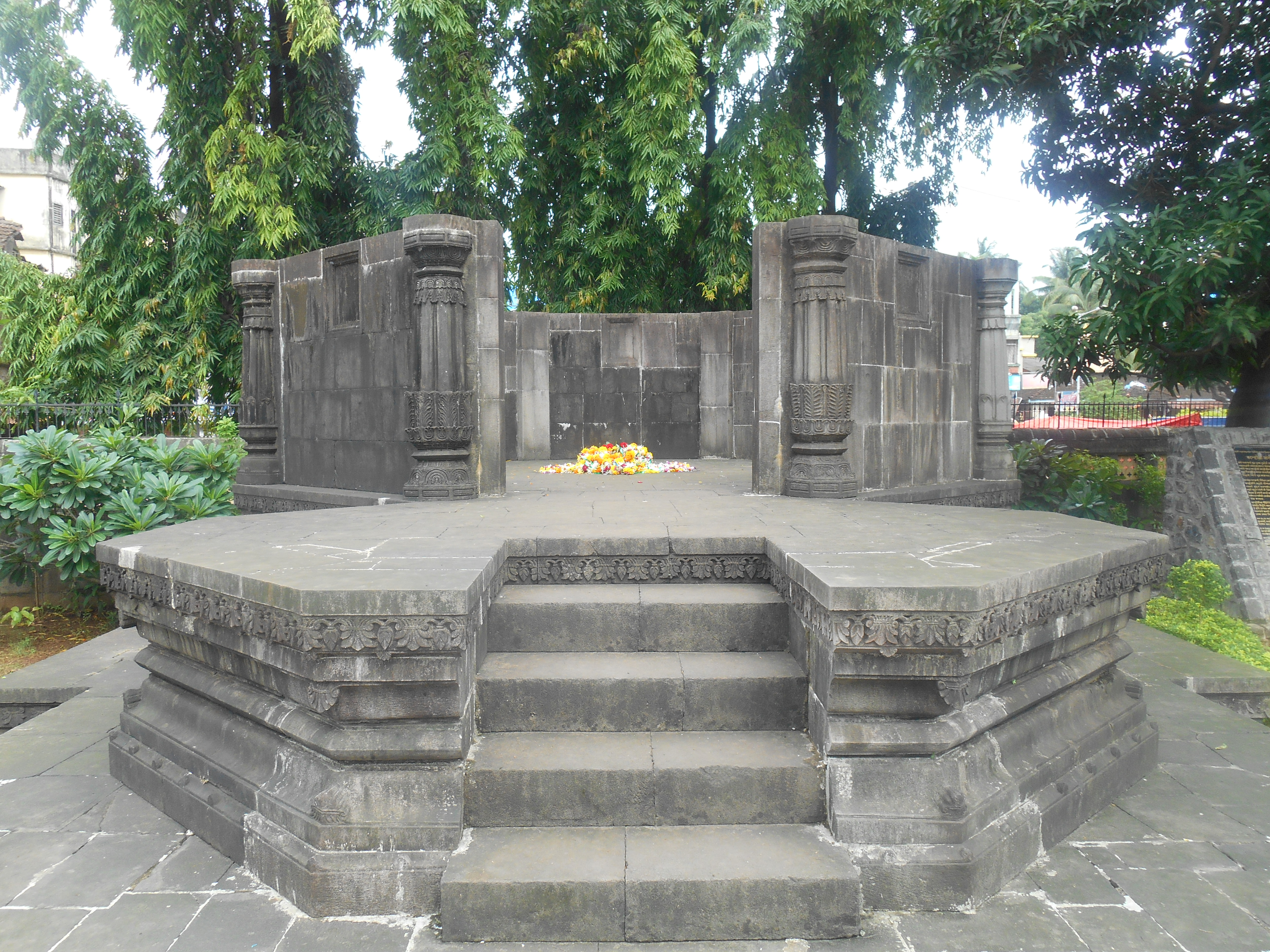
Kanhoji Angre Samadhi

- Kolaba Fort, an old fortified maritime base which was the naval headquarters of the Maratha ruler Shivaji, and was used to launch raids on British ships.
- 'Kanhoji Angre Samadhi', the memorial to Maratha Admiral Kanhoji Angre

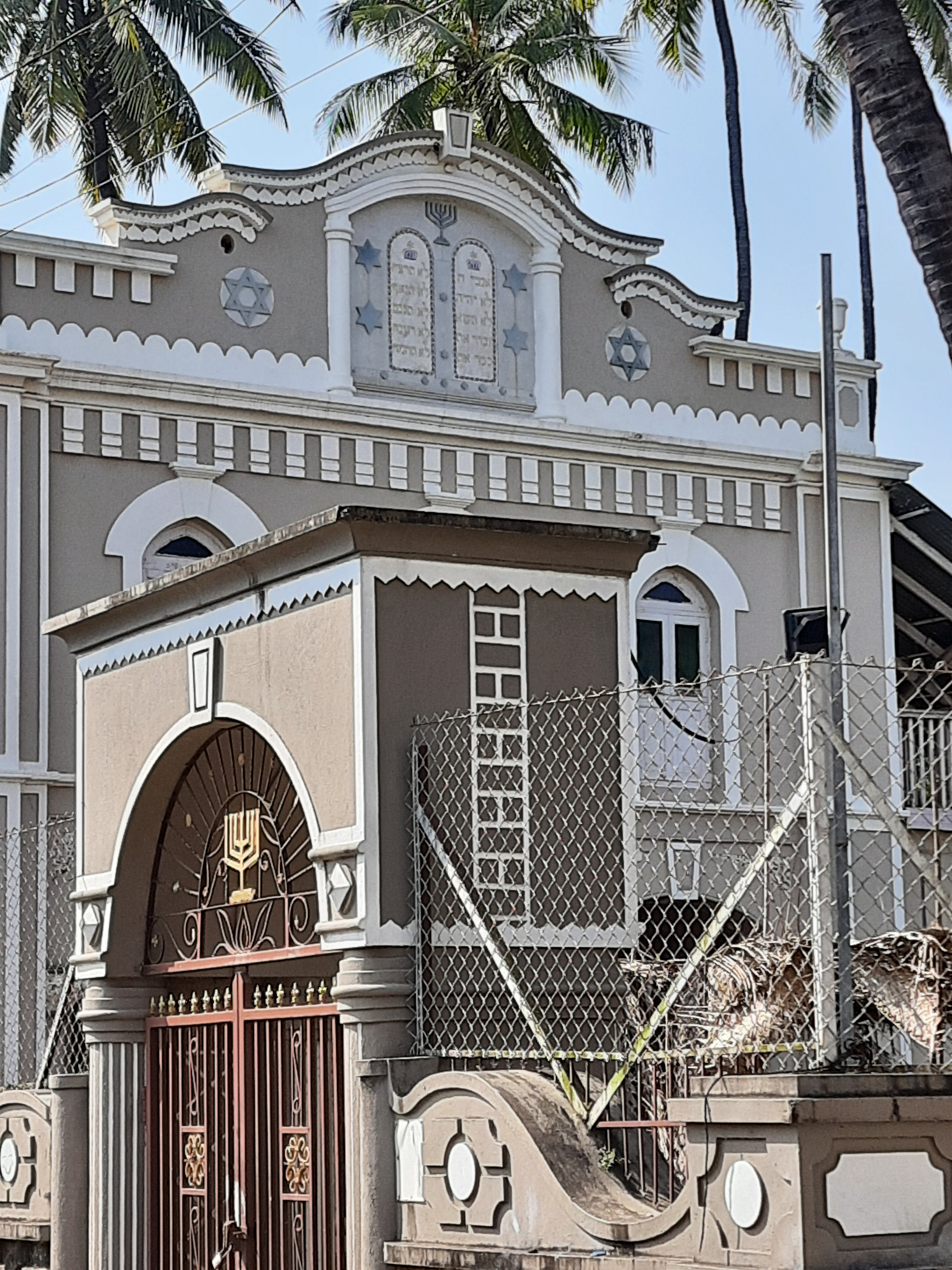
Magen Aboth Jewish Synagogue, Alibaug

- Hirakot fort, built by Kanhoji Angre in 1720

=== Religious ===
- Kalambika Mandir, temple built by Kanhoji Angre
- Balaji Mandir, temple to Lord Shri Balaji or Shri Venkateshwar (an avatar of lord Shri Vishnu), built in 1788.
- 'Magen Aboth synagogue' in the 'Israel Alley' area of the town

=== Scientific ===
Alibag houses a magnetic observatory that was set up in 1904. It serves as one of the significant observatories forming part of a global network now run by Indian Institute of Geomagnetism. The observatory has two buildings; the first building has magnetometers that record changes occurring in the geomagnetic fields. The second building consists of precision recording instruments, which give data about geomagnetic storms caused by solar storms which are shared with other countries.

== Transport ==
=== Road ===
Alibag is situated near National Highway – 166A. It is approximately 108 km by road from Mumbai. Alibag also has MSRTC bus connectivity mostly from Mumbai and Konkan division.

=== Boat services ===
The nearest jetty is Mandwa, from where catamaran/ferry services are available to the Gateway of India, Mumbai.

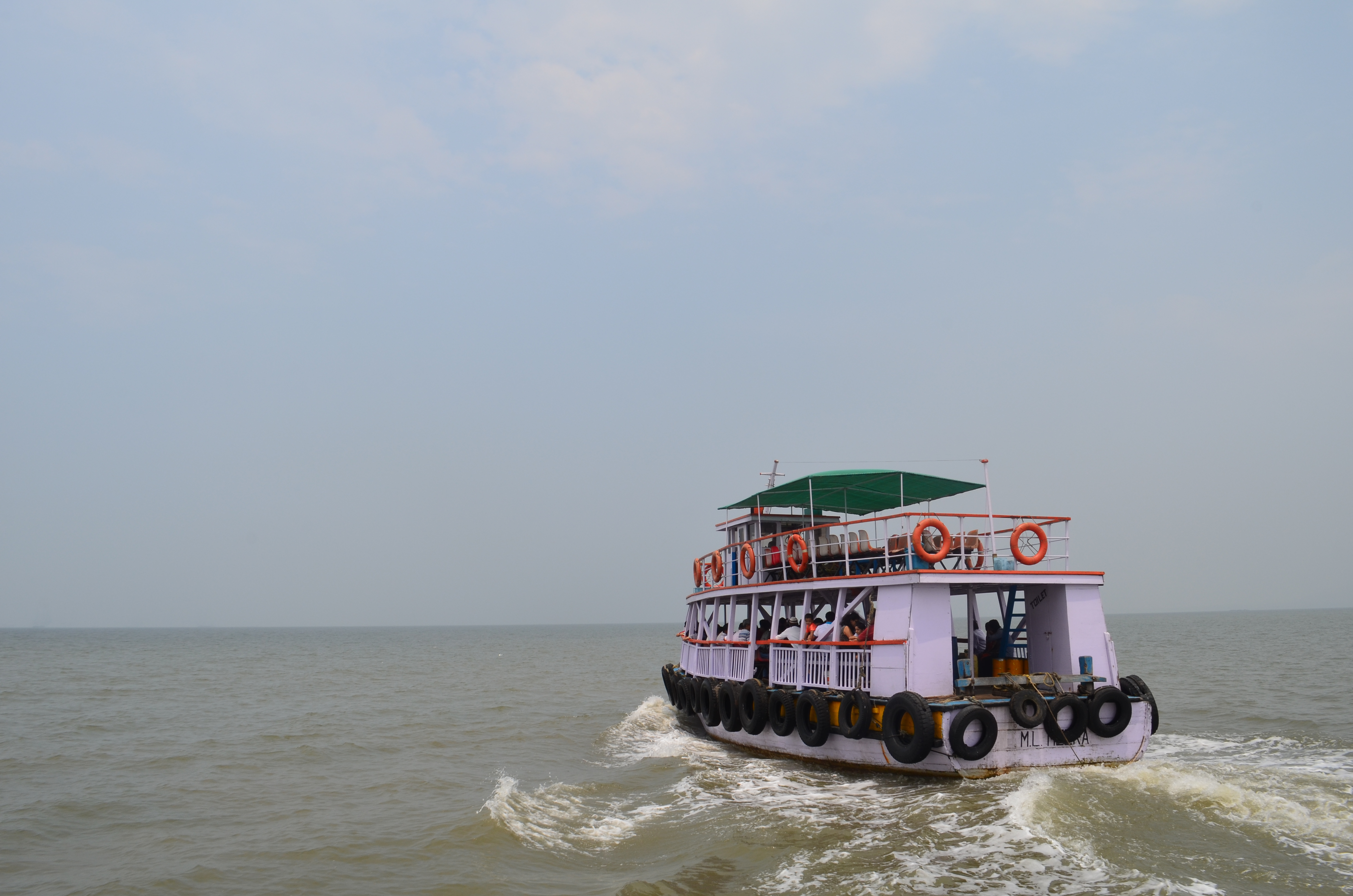
Ferry service between Mandwa and Gateway of India, Mumbai.

A Ro-Ro service is available from Ferry Wharf to Mandwa from where Alibag can be reached by road. Apart from the regular ferries, a fast water taxi network also connects Alibag to Mumbai. These boats run between the Domestic Cruise Terminal in South Mumbai and Mandwa jetty near Alibag, making the trip in less than an hour.

== Notable people ==
Notable people born in Alibag include:

- Kanhoji Angre – Indian admiral, Maratha Navy's Chief (18th-century India)
- Datta Narayan Patil – Indian Politician & Social Worker
- Devdatta Nage – Indian actor
- Nana Patekar – Film actor and writer
- Sanjay Raut – Indian journalist & politician
- Ramesh Tendulkar – Noted Marathi poet and Sachin Tendulkar's father
- Adesh Bandekar – Marathi actor, politician
- Arun Shridhar Vaidya – 13th Chief of the Army Staff (India)
- Mugdha Vaishampayan – Indian singer
- Nanasaheb Dharmadhikari – Indian spiritual Guru
- Mukri – Indian actor

== Education ==
Alibag has a Government Medical College for medical students in the district. The medical college started in the year 2022.

== Geographical indication ==
Alibag White onion was awarded the Geographical Indication (GI) status tag from the Geographical Indications Registry, under the Union Government of India, on 16 November 2022.

Alibag Pandhara Kanda Shetkari Utpadak Gat from Alibag, proposed the GI registration of Alibag White onion. After filing the application in January 2020, the Onion was granted the GI tag in 2022 by the Geographical Indication Registry in Chennai, making the name "Alibag White onion" exclusive to the Onion grown in the region. It thus became the second onion variety from Maharashtra after Lasalgaon onion and the 17th type of goods from Maharashtra to earn the GI tag.
