= Manori =

Village in Maharashtra

- Village
- Location in Maharashtra, India Manori (India)
- Coordinates: 19.21°N 72.79°E
- Country: India
- State: Maharashtra
- District: Mumbai Suburban
- City: Mumbai

Government
  - Type: Municipal Corporation
  - Body: Brihanmumbai Municipal Corporation (MCGM)

Languages
  - Official: Marathi
- Time zone: UTC+5:30 (IST)
- PIN: 400095
- Area code: 022
- Civic agency: BMC

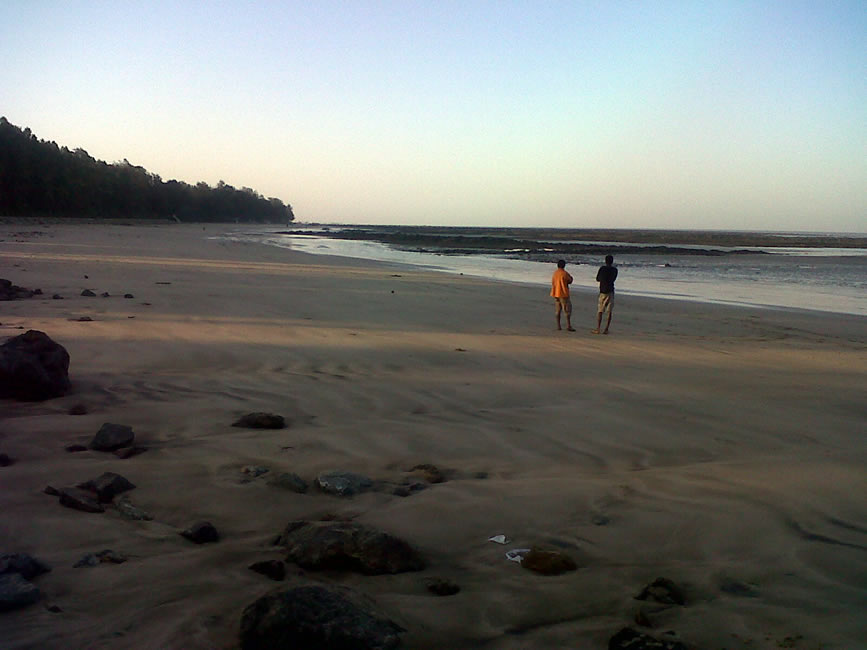
Manori beach during early morning.

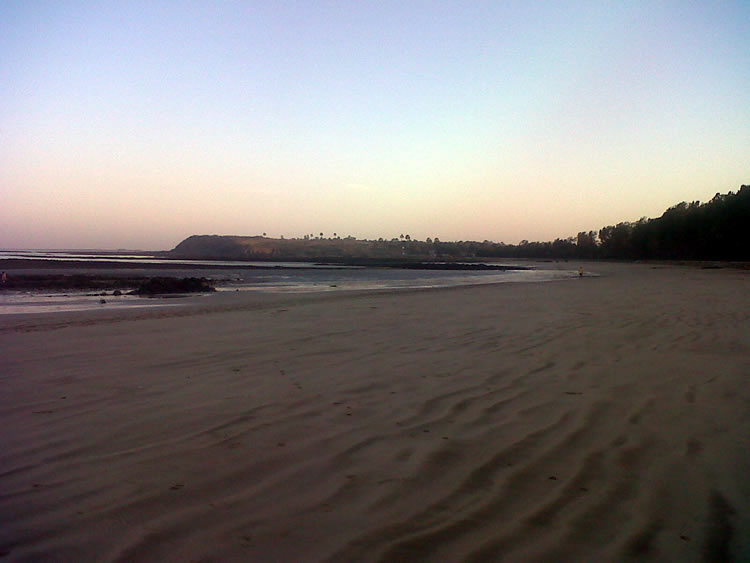
Another view of Manori beach during early morning.

Manori is a village located on Dharavi Bet in northern Mumbai, India. It is known for its beach along India's west coast and the Manori Creek.
