= Manori Creek =

Creek in Mumbai, Maharashtra, India

Coordinates: 19°11′N 72°47′E

Manori Creek (also Malad Creek) is a creek (tidal channel) on Salsette Island, northern Mumbai (Bombay), India. It is also known as Gorai Creek further north. The Dahisar River drains into this creek.

In May 2017, a two year long research by the National Environment Engineering Research Institute found that creeks including Manori, Thane and Malad creeks were being choked due to the unchecked growth of mangroves caused by the discharge of untreated sewage and urban waste. In June 2024, a controversy erupted in Manori over creek reclamation for roll-on roll-off (RORO) jetty construction by the Mumbai Maritime Board after truckloads of boulders and mud were dumped on the mangroves. Later in July, the central Ministry of Environment wrote to the Maharashtra Coastal Zone Management Authority to look into the illegal reclamation in Manori Creek. A study in 2007 by a group of scholars revealed that the water quality in the creek had deteriorated.

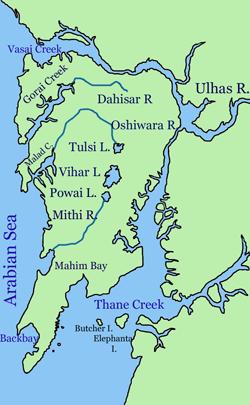
Location

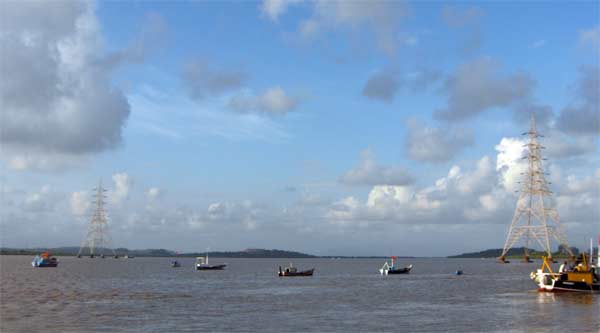
Power pylons

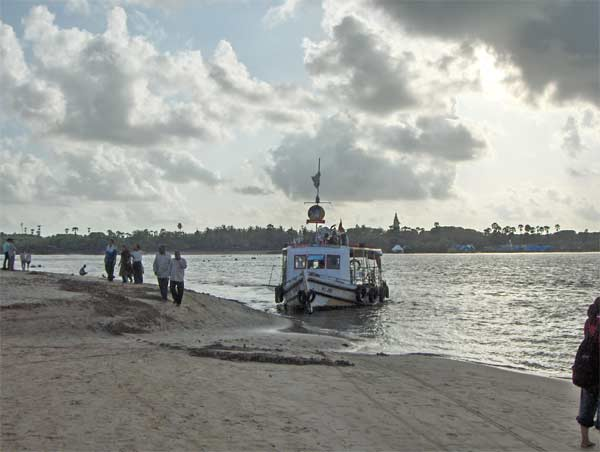
Boat on creek

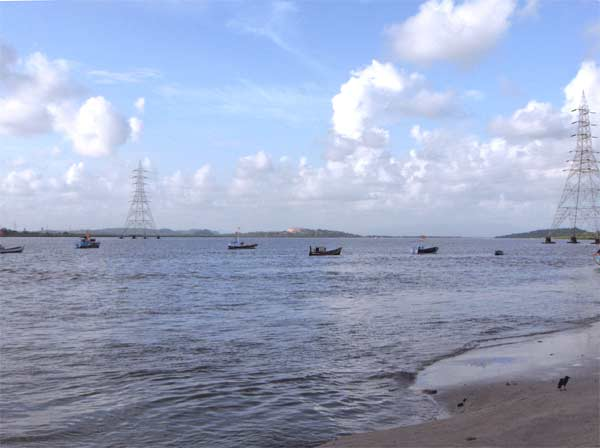
Creek

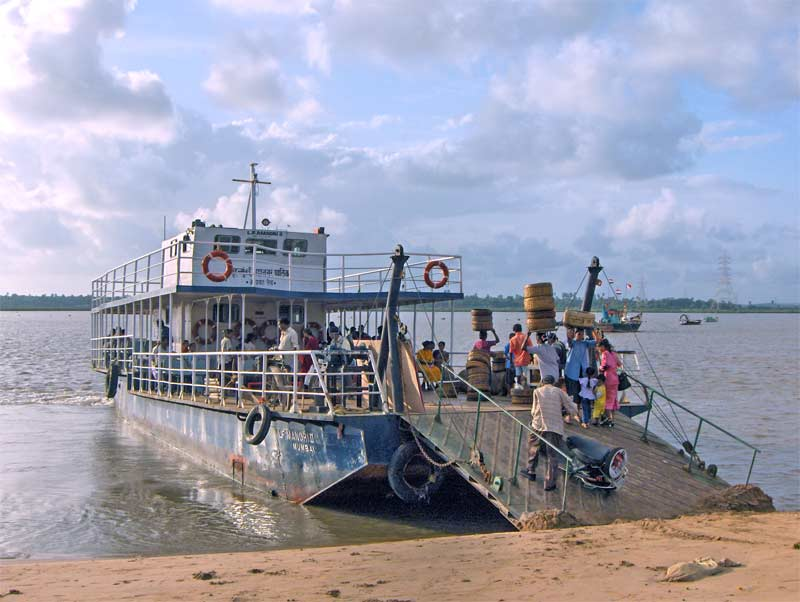
Ferry on Manori Creek
