= List of ports in India =

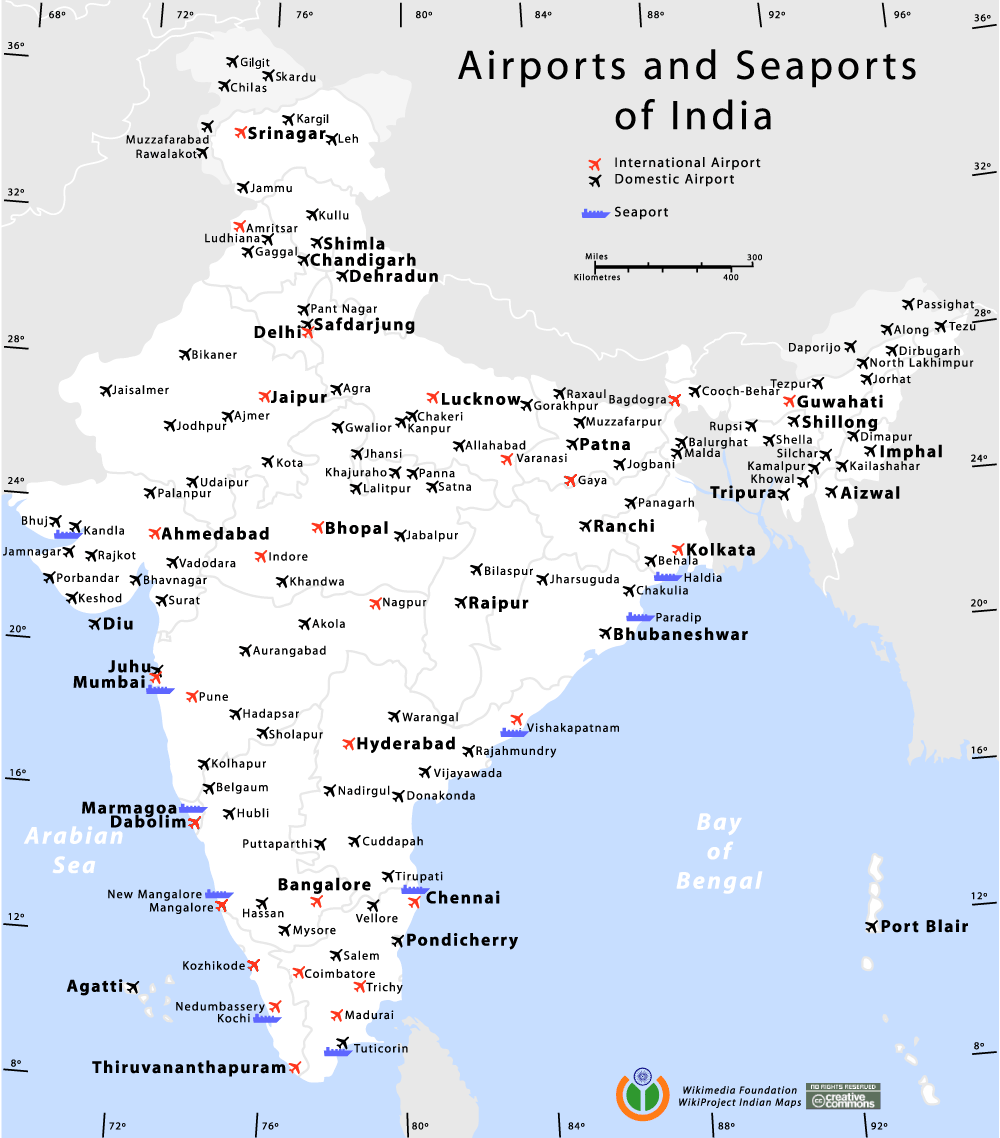
Map showing the location of airports and seaports in India

In India, ports are categorised into Mega ports, Major ports and Non-Major ports. As of 2024, the country has 5 mega ports, 14 major ports and 217 non-major ports. Major ports are administered by the Ministry of Ports, Shipping and Waterways under the Government of India, whereas non-major ports fall under the jurisdiction of State Maritime Boards of respective state governments, including private ports operating under the public–private partnership (PPP) model. A port is declared to be Mega port if it handled 150 million metric tonnes (MMT) of cargo in the preceding financial year in the case of a bulk port, or 7.5 million twenty-foot equivalent units (TEUs) in the case of a container port regardless of if it is Major or Non-Major. Among the 217 non-major ports, cargo is handled only at 68 ports, others are used by fishing vessels and ferries.

India has a coastline of 11,098 kilometres, forming one of the largest peninsulas in the world. According to the Ministry of Ports, Shipping and Waterways, around 95 percent of India's trading by volume and 70 percent by value is done through maritime transport. India's major ports handled highest ever cargo of 795 million tonne in FY23. Paradip Port is the largest container port in India owned by government.

Due to the shallow depth of its east coast ports (8-12 meters), India is unable to accommodate large ships, causing 25% of its cargo to be diverted to deeper foreign ports and resulting in an annual economic loss of Rs 1,500-4,500 crore. In 2024, the upcoming International Container Transshipment Port, Galathea Bay was notified as India's 13th major port. Its first phase of development is expected to be commissioned in 2028. Port Blair, which was notified as a major port in 2010, was later removed. The ports are spread across Andaman and Nicobar Islands, Andhra Pradesh, Goa, Gujarat, Karnataka, Kerala, Maharashtra, Odisha, Puducherry, Tamil Nadu, and West Bengal. Government of India plans to build new greenfield ports and also built associated infrastructure such as railway lines through the 2015 established Sagar Mala project, and National Maritime Development Program.

== Shipping in India ==
According to Constitution of India, maritime transport is to be administered by both the Central and the State governments. While the central government's shipping ministry administers the major ports, the minor and intermediate ports are administered by the relevant departments or ministries in the nine coastal states of Andhra Pradesh, Goa, Gujarat, Karnataka, Kerala, Maharashtra, Odisha, Tamil Nadu and West Bengal. Several of these 187 minor and intermediate ports have been identified by the respective governments to be developed, in a phased manner, a good proportion of them involving public–private partnership.

The maritime boards of state governments administer control of minor ports owned by state governments. In 2018–19, minor ports of Gujarat alone handled total 542 MMT of cargo. Maharashtra Maritime Board sets record of handling 71 mn tons of cargo in 2022–23.

=== Capacity ===
The capacity of Indian ports currently stands at 2,604.99 mtpa. The container throughput of Indian ports stood at 17 million TEUs for the period 2020. Mundra Port is the largest port as well as the highest capacity port in India, and it is also the largest container port by volume. It has a capacity to handle 338 MMT (Million Metric Tons) of cargo annually. Paradip Port has the 2nd highest cargo capacity of 150 MMT. Kandla Port has 3rd highest capacity.

=== Ship building ===
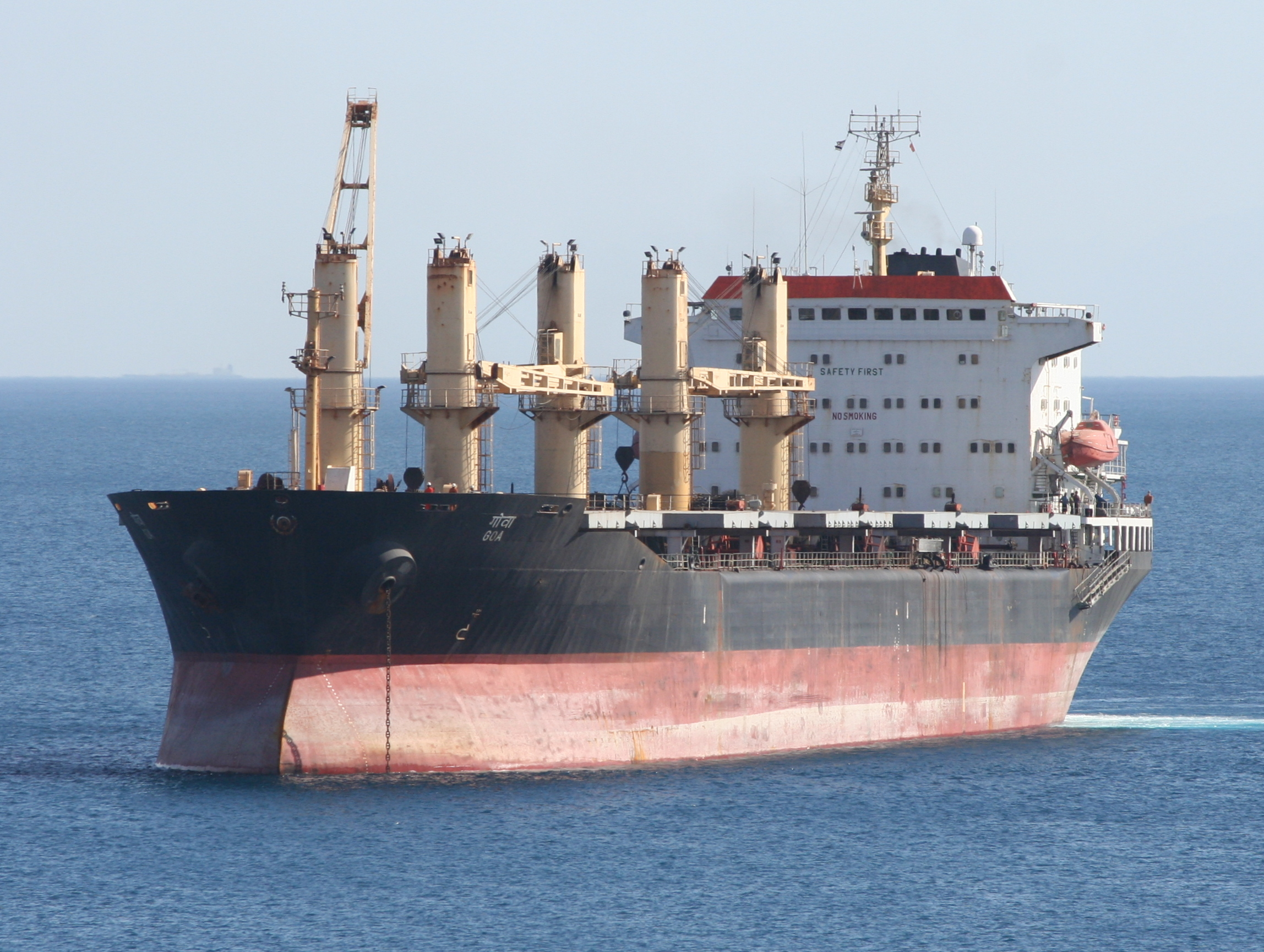
MV Goa built by Hindustan Shipyard in 1997 for SCI

India has been building large ships after the independence using companies like Hindustan Shipyard, Pipavav Shipyard and Cochin Shipyard. SS Jala Usha, a steamship built by Hindustan Shipyard in 1948 and the first of its kind to be built within the Indian subcontinent after WW-II.The first oil tanker built by Cochin Shipyard Limited (CSL) was the MV Rani Padmini, which was delivered in July 1981. India launched 93,000 DWT oil tanker in 2002 under Third Vajpayee ministry, The ship named Maharshi Parashuram built by Cochin Shipyard was 237 meter long double vessel was fitted with 14,300 HP engine. Abul Kalam Azad is another similar-size oil tanker ship built by Cochin Shipyard in 1999 which has been scrapped.

=== Ship breaking ===
As of January 2020, India has 30% share of ship breaking with annual US$1.1 billion revenue. India is a signatory to Hong Kong International Convention for the safe and environmentally sound recycling of ships. India plans to pass the "Recycling of Ships Act, 2019" to ratify the Hong Kong treaty. This will allow India to capture its targeted 60% in the global ship breaking business while doubling the annual to US$2.3 billion target. India's Alang-Sosiya Ship Breaking Yard is world's largest ships' graveyard. Other ship graveyards in India is the Steel Industrials Kerala Limited breaking unit.

== Ports in India ==
=== Sagar Mala: port-led development ===
See Sagar Mala project.

=== Transshipment ports ===
Most ports on India's east coast have a depth of 8-12 metres, which is too shallow for large ships. The world's major ports are 12-20 metres deep, which can handle ships weighing more than 1.65 lakh tonnes. That's why 25% of India's cargo goes through foreign ports like Colombo Port Sri Lanka, Jurong Port Singapore and Klang Port Malaysia. This leads to a direct loss of Rs 1,500 crore every year and a setback of Rs 3,000-4,500 crore every year to India's GDP. To move this 25% transshipment from foreignports back to Indian ports, India is developing following deep sea ports as automated global international container transshipment hubs:

- Eastern Coastal India:
  - International Container Transshipment Port, Galathea Bay in Andaman and Nicobar Islands, greenfield, under-construction with phase-I completion target date of 2028.
- Western Coastal India:
  - Cochin Port in Kerala: existing and operational, 14.5m draft depth. India's first international container transshipment terminal (ICTT).
  - International Deep Water Container Transhipment Port in Thiruvananthapuram (Trivandrum Port) owned by Vizhinjam International Seaport Ltd Thiruvananthapuram of Government of Kerala, greenfield, operational, India's first and deepest international container transshipment port (ICTP), 24 meters deep draft. and its only port directly adjacent to an international shipping lane. The port is 10 nautical miles (19 km; 12 mi) on the heavily-trafficked east-west shipping channel connecting Europe to the Persian Gulf, Southeast Asia, and the Far East (Suez–Far East route and Far East–Middle East route).
  - Vadhavan Port in Maharashtra, greenfield, under-construction with Phase-1 completion by 2029 and phase-2 by 2024, 20 meters draft, India's first offshore port on artificial island.

=== Mega Ports ===
Mega and Mother ports in India

The Ministry of Ports, Shipping and Waterways officially notified Deendayal (Kandla), Jawaharlal Nehru (Nhava Sheva), Paradip, and Mundra as India's first mega ports under Section 73 of the Indian Ports Act, 2025 via a gazette notification issued on September 25, 2026. The notification states that the four ports satisfy the criteria for classification as a mega port. These criteria were notified on July 30, 2026 in consultation with State governments. Under the criteria, a port is eligible to be declared a mega port if it handled 150 million metric tonnes (MMT) of cargo in the preceding financial year in the case of a bulk port, or 7.5 million twenty-foot equivalent units (TEUs) in the case of a container port. Where a port handles both container and bulk cargo, container volumes are to be converted to tonnes using the conversion method adopted by the port. Cargo throughput includes all export-import and coastal cargo, whether bulk, break-bulk, liquid, dry or containerised. It is to be computed in a manner that avoids double counting of transhipped cargo as far as practicable.

| No. | Name | Estb. Year | Image | Area (km^{2}) | Location | State/UT | Cargo handled in MTPA (FY2022-23) |
|---|---|---|---|---|---|---|---|
| 1 | Mundra Port | 1998 | | 84 | Mundra | Gujarat | 136 |
| 2 | Deendayal Port | 1965 | | 9.83 | Kandla | Gujarat | 269.1 |
| 3 | Paradip Port | 1966 | | 10 | Paradeep | Odisha | 289.75 |
| 4 | Jawaharlal Nehru Port | 1988 | | 3.37 | Navi Mumbai | Maharashtra | 141.37 |

=== Deepwater Container Transhipment Port (Mother Port) ===
| No. | Name | Estb. Year | Image | City | State | Ownership |
|---|---|---|---|---|---|---|
| 1 | International Deepwater ContainerTranshipment Port in Thiruvananthapuram (Trivandrum Port) | 2025 | | Trivandrum | Kerala | Vizhinjam International Seaport Ltd, Government of Kerala |

=== Major Ports ===
13 Major ports (owned by the Government of India) in India

The ports under the Central Government of India are known as Major ports, and other ports owned by private operators are classified as Non-Major ports, irrespective of total cargo handled. The following are the Major ports of India:

| No. | Name | Estb. Year | Image | Area (km^{2}) | Location | State/UT | Cargo handled in MTPA (FY2022-23) |
|---|---|---|---|---|---|---|---|
| 1 | Chennai Port | 1881 | | | Chennai | Tamil Nadu | 136 |
| 2 | Cochin Port | 1928 | | | Kochi | Kerala | 79.9 |
| 3 | Kamarajar Port | 2001 | | | Ennore | Tamil Nadu | 91 |
| 4 | Mormugao Port | 1985 | | | Mormugao | Goa | 63.4 |
| 5 | Mumbai Port | 1873 | | | Mumbai | Maharashtra | 84 |
| 6 | New Mangalore Port | 1974 | | 8.22 | Mangaluru | Karnataka | 114.96 |
| 7 | Haldia Dock Complex | 1977 | | 25.77 | Haldia | West Bengal | 92.77 |
| 8 | Syama Prasad Mookerjee Port | 1870 | | | Kolkata | West Bengal | 50.7 |
| 9 | V. O. Chidambaranar Port (Thoothukudi Port) | 1974 | | 2.428 | Thoothukkudi | Tamil Nadu | 111.46 |
| 10 | Visakhapatnam Port | 1933 | | | Visakhapatnam | Andhra Pradesh | 143.68 |

=== Non-Major Ports ===
The ports owned by private operators are classified as Minor ports, irrespective of total cargo handled. The following are the Non-Major ports of India:

| No. | Name | Estb. Year | Image | City | State | Ownership |
|---|---|---|---|---|---|---|
| 1 | Karaikal Port | 2009 | | Karaikal | Puducherry | Adani Group |
| 2 | Jaigad Port | 2006 | | Jaigad | Maharashtra | JSW Group |
| 3 | Krishnapatnam Port | 2008 | | Krishnapatnam | Andhra Pradesh | Adani Group |
| 4 | Dharamtar Port | 2012 | | Alibag | Maharashtra | JSW Group |
| 5 | Hazira Port | 2025 | | Hazira | Gujarat | Adani Group |
| 6 | Dighi Port | 2000 | | Raigad | Maharashtra | Adani Group |
| 7 | Dhamra Port | 2011 | | Bhadrak | Odisha | Adani Group |
| 8 | Gopalpur Port | 2013 | | Gopalpur | Odisha | Adani Group |
| 9 | Gangavaram Port | 2009 | | Visakhapatnam | Andhra Pradesh | Adani Group |
| 10 | Kattupalli Port | 2012 | | Kattupalli | Tamil Nadu | Adani Group |
| 11 | Dahej Port | 2010 | | Dahej | Gujarat | Adani Group |
| 12 | Kakinada Port | 1999 | | Kakinada | Andhra Pradesh | KSL |
| 13 | Tuna Port | 2022 | | Tuna | Gujarat | Adani Group |
| 14 | Machilipatnam Port | 2025 | | Machilipatnam | Andhra Pradesh | MPDCL |
| 15 | Port Pipavav | 2002 | | Pipavav | Gujarat | APM Terminals |
| 16 | Vizhinjam Port | 1946 | | Trivandrum | Kerala | Kerala Maritime Board under Government of Kerala |

=== Unranked seaports ===
- Angré Port
- Beypore Port
- Beda Port
- Bedi Port
- New Bedi Port
- Bhavnagar Port
- Bhankodar Port
- Gangolli Port
- Jakhau Port
- Karanja Port
- Karwar Port
- Kollam Port
- Yogayatan Port
- Mandvi Port and Shipyard
- Nagapattinam Port
- Navlakhi Port
- Okha Port
- Port Blair Port
- Porbandar Port
- Rajula Port
- Redi Port
- Rewas Port
- Rozi Port
- Vadinar Port
- Veraval Port
- Salav Port
- Sikka Port
- Simar Port

=== River ports ===
The following are the River ports of India:

- Dhubri Port
- Durgachak Port
- Kottayam Port
- Farakka Port
- Magdalla Port
- Pandu Port
- Varanasi Port
- Sahebganj Port

== Statistics ==
Top 10 ports in India by container traffic (FY 2025-26)
| Year | Container traffic in million TEUs |
|---|---|
| Mundra | 8.5 |
| Mumbai (JNPT) | 8.17 |
| Chennai | 1.91 |
| Trivandrum (Vizhinjam) | 1.3 |
| Kolkata (SPMP) | 0.96 |
| Tuticorin | 0.8 |
| Kochi | 0.76 |
| Ennore | 0.7 |
| Pipavav | 0.66 |
| Kandla | 0.62 |

== Maritime boards ==
Maritime boards by state:

| State Maritime Boards | Established |
|---|---|
| Gujarat Maritime Board | 1982 |
| Maharashtra Maritime Board | 1996 |
| Tamil Nadu Maritime Board | 1997 |
| Karnataka Maritime Board | 2017 |
| Kerala Maritime Board | 2017 |
| Andhra Pradesh Maritime Board | 2019 |
| West Bengal Maritime Board | 2015 |
| Odisha Maritime Board | 2022 |

- No maritime board has been established in the state of Goa yet, but the Government's Captain of Ports Department (established in 1912) looks after the development of Inland Waterways and Minor Ports of Goa.

== See also ==
- Aviation in India
- Indian Railway
- Roads in India
- Transport in India
