= Maharashtra Maritime Board =

Governmental organisation of India

Maharashtra Maritime Board Logo

The Maharashtra Maritime Board is a governmental organisation in the state of Maharashtra, India. The board is tasked with the administration of ports and harbours, conservancy, licensing of crafts, levying of fees, regulation and control of maritime traffic. Maharashtra Maritime Board (MMB) came into existence in 1996 and Commissioner, Water Transport was designated as its chief executive officer.

Commissionerate of Water Transport was formed in 1990 by amalgamating 3 departments within the Port Organisation, i.e. CPO, Hydrographer and Marine Engineer, for better co-ordination and to promote development of minor and intermediate ports in the State of Maharashtra, and to administer, control and manage these ports.

== Background ==
Maharashtra is bestowed with a coastline of 720 km, of which Greater Mumbai District has approximately 114 km, Thane District 127 km, Raigad District 122 km, Ratnagiri District 237 km, and Sindhudurg District 120 km. There are 48 Intermediate & Non-Major Ports and 35 creeks on this coastline. The Port Organisation under the Buildings and Communications Department was formed by the State Government on 1 April 1963 under the control of Chief Ports Officer – Maharashtra State. Administration of ports and harbours, conservancy, licensing of crafts, levying of fees and regulation/ control of traffic etc. were entrusted to this organisation.

There are 48 intermediate and minor ports situated on the coast of Maharashtra, which are organised in five Groups, each headed by a Port Officer. Following five groups of ports were formed, which are each headed by a Port Officer:

No.	Group	Ports
1.	Bandra Group of Ports	Dahanu, Tarapur, Navapur, Satpati, Kelwa-Mahim, Arnala (including Datiware), Vasal, Uttan, Versova, Manori and Bandra
2.	Mora Group of Ports	Trombay including Mahul, Panvel (Ulwa-Belapur), Mora, Karanja (including Rewas & Dharamtar), Mandwa, Thane, Bhiwandi and Kalyan
3.	Rajpuri Group of Ports	Thal, Alibag, Revdanda, Borli-Mandala, Nandgaon, Murud-Janjira, Rajpuri (Dighi), Mandad, Kumbharu and Shrivardhan
4.	Ratnagiri Group of Ports	Bankot, Kelshi, Harnai, Dabhol, Palshet, Borya, Jaigad, Varoda (Tivrli), Ratnagiri, Purnagad and Jaitapur
5.	Vengurla Group of Ports	Vijaydurg, Devgad, Achara, Malvan, Nivati, Vengurla, Redi and Kiranpani

For better co-ordination between its three branches vide GR dated 31 August 1990 the State Government created a post of Commissioner, Water Transport as Head of Department of the state's Port Organisation.

As a sequel to the liberalisation policy pursued by the Central Govt. in the early nineties, the State Govt. decided to transform this organization, thus far under the Commissioner, Water Transport, and constitute Maharashtra Maritime Board, with the Minister of Ports as its chairman.

== Ports in Maharashtra ==
Mumbai has three ports, Mumbai Port, Jawaharlal Nehru Port (JNP) and another big port Dharamtar Port located in Mumbai Metropolitan Area. While Mumbai port has been acting as one of the major gateways for more than a century, JNP since its establishment in the 1990s has emerged as a premier container handling port, accounting for almost 55% of the container traffic movement amongst the major ports in India.

The operational minor (non-major) ports under Maharashtra Maritime Board( MMB) handling cargo include the ports at Dahanu, Tarapur, Dharamtar, Ulwa-Belapur, Trombay, Revdanda, Dighi, Dabhol, Bankot, Kelshi, Ratnagiri, Jaigad, Vijaydurg and Redi. The total cargo handled at the minor ports increased from 8.5 Million Tonnes in 2002-03 to 11.1 Million Tonnes in 2005-06. The cargo commodities handled at the minor ports are bulk cargo and include coal, clinker, iron ore, limestone, cement, bauxite, sand, LPG, molasses etc.

MMB has also conceptualised Inland Water Transport projects under the centrally sponsored Scheme of Ministry of Shipping, GoI. Some of these include:

- From South Mumbai to Amba River/Dharamtar Creek at Mandwa
- In Vashishti River at Dabhol to Dhopave
- In Savitri River at Bankot(Veshvi) to Bagmandla
- In Jaigad Creek at Tavsal to Jaigad Port
- In Mhasla / Mandad River (Rajpuri Creek) at Dighi
- From South Mumbai to Amba River/Dharamtar Creek at Rewas
- For eco-tourism project at Isapur, District Nanded, Maharashtra

Efforts are also on to develop passenger water transport projects around Mumbai.

== Board ==
Hon. Minister (Ports) Shri. Sanjay Baburao Bansode (Cabinet Minister for Ports Maharashtra )	Chairman
Hon. State Minister (Ports)	Vice Chairman
Secretary (Ports)	Member
Secretary (Industries)	Member
Secretary (Finance)	Member
Representative of Navy	Member
Chief Executive Officer	Member Secretary
Non-official members	SIX other members

== Functions ==
The functions of the Maharashtra Maritime board are:

- Development of Minor Ports and Harbours for promoting cargo movement with a view to boost the economic activity along the coastline and state's hinterland.
- Enforcement of Maritime Rules & regulations for administration and conservancy of ports, for regulating traffic and tariff structure and licensing of crafts etc.
- Development of Inland Water Transport for cargo as well as for passenger movement in the inland waterways within the state.
- To carry out Hydrographic Surveys and other allied investigations along the west coast of Maharashtra in the creeks as well as in the rivers of the Konkan region.
- To carry out various functions assigned to it by the GOM from time to time.

Organization Chart

== Performance Highlights ==
The following are the performance highlights of the Maharashtra Maritime Board:

- Jaigad Port (Developer: M/s JSW Jaigarh Port Limited) inaugurated on 22 August 2009.
- Construction of LNG terminal promoted by M/s RGPP Ltd. Completed, and is likely to receive first LNG vessel by early 2010.
- Construction of Dighi Port developed by Dighi Port Ltd. is under progress and its 1st berth is likely to be commissioned in March 2010.
- Shipyard construction at Usgaon, Dabhol, Dist. Ratnagiri promoted by M/s Bharati Shipyard for building ships up to 100,000 dwt is currently underway.
- In May 2007, Environmental clearance obtained for Rewas-Aware Port to be developed by Rewas Port Ltd. (under Reliance Group) with a capital investment of Rs. 6,000 Crores (Rupees 6 Billion).

== Developments ==
=== Port Project ===
The Government of Maharashtra has encouraged development of port sector and adopted an investor-friendly Port Policy. The port policy has evolved over the years with considerable changes during 1996, 2000, 2002. The salient features of the port policy are:

- Development on Build, Own, Operate, Share and Transfer (BOOST) basis
- Concession period of 50 years
- Concessional Wharfage on cargo handling at port
- If available, Govt. land on lease at market valuation
- Equity participation in SPV by MMB up to 11%
- Whereas, road linkage to nearest State Highway are to be partly funded by the State, development of roads within port limits will be the responsibility of developer.
- Freedom given to developer to fix tariffs
- Government to appoint two Directors on SPV company formed for port development

==== Upcoming ports in Maharashtra ====
In our endeavour to develop the port sector for meeting the requirements of India's growing economy and to address the needs of its industry, we have entered into six Concession Agreements for development of minor ports, namely:

1. Rewas-Aware Port
2. Dighi Port
3. Jaigad Port (Dhamankhol Bay)
4. Jaigad Port (Lavgan)
5. Vijaydurg Port
6. Redi Port
7. Yogayatan Port (Mankhurd)

=== Multipurpose Terminals ===
The Government of Maharashtra has declared a policy for construction of multipurpose jetties on 19 August 2005 to promote transportation of cargoes through short-sea shipping (SSS — Coastal Route).These Jetties can also handle international cargo through lighter-age operations.

==== Salient Features of the policy ====
- Site Identification be done by the developer
- Project will be developed on Build, Own, Operate & Transfer (BOOT) basis
- Period of concession will be up to a maximum of 30 years, which includes 2 years for construction
- Techno-Economic Feasibility (TEFS) Report from the developer is a necessary requirement
- Public Notification (Swiss challenge)

MMB invites entrepreneurs to set up multi purpose terminals along the Maharashtra coast-line for their multipurpose cargoes. These terminals would be of great help to cope with the surging need for maritime infrastructure, especially port facilities.

==== Multi-purpose terminals in operation ====
Sr. No.	Port	Company using terminal	Cargo	Status
1.	Karanja (Navi Mumbai)	PNP Maritime Services Ltd.	Iron Ore, Coke/ Coal, Sulpher, Bauxite	In operation since 2015
2.	Jaigad (Lavgan)	Lavgan Dockyard Ltd.	Bauxite, Molasses	In operation since 2005
3.	Jaigad (Katale)	Marine Syndicate Ltd.	Bauxite	In operation since February, 2009

==== Permissions granted to multi-purpose terminals ====
Sr. No.	Port	Company using terminal	Activity/ Cargo to be handled	Status
1.	Trombay –Mankhurd in Thane creek	M/s. Yogayatan Ports Pvt. Ltd.	Ship repair and Dry bulk	Agreement signed
2.	Karanja – Khopta village in Karanja Creek	M/S. Continental Warehousing Corporation Ltd.	Containers and Dry bulk	Agreement signed
3.	Revdanda – village Sanegaon in Kundalika river/ Revdanda creek	M/S. Indo Energy International Ltd.	Bulk cargo	Agreement signed
4.	Karanja (Chanje, Dist. Raigarh)	M/s Karanja Infrastructure Pvt. Ltd.	Bulk, bagged & containers	Agreement signed

=== Captive Jetties ===
In order to facilitate import of raw materials and export of finished goods for industries located on Maharashtra's coastal belt, the Government has floated a policy for construction of captive jetties on its coast. The broad features of the policy are:

- Land and site for jetty will be leased out to the developer on concession basis for a period of 30 years
- Project will be developed on Build, Operate & Transfer (BOT) basis
- No berthing dues levied on vessels calling at these captive jetties
- Wharfage charges as per the tariffs notified by the State Government from time-to-time
- Jetty, superstructure & its supra-structure facilities to revert to MMB at the end of 30 years concession period

==== Captive terminals in operation ====
Sr. No.	Port	Company using the Terminal	Cargo	Status
1.	Panvel (Ulwa–Belapur)	Ambuja Cements Ltd.	Bulk Cement	In operation since 1994
2.	Alibag (Dharamtar)	Ispat Steel	Iron Ore, Coke / Coal, Sponge Iron, Clinker	In operation since 1994
3.	Revdanda	Vikram Ispat Ltd.	Iron Ore/ Pallets / Fines, HBI, DRI	In operation since 1993
4.	Ratnagiri (Pawas–Ranpar)	Finolex Industries Ltd.	EDC, Ethylene & LPG	In operation since 1993

==== Projects in progress ====
Sr. No.	Port	Company using Terminal	Permitted Cargo	Status
1.	Dabhol	Ratnagiri Gas and Power Pvt. Ltd. (previously Dabhol Power Co.)	LNG Naptha	Agreement likely to be signed
2.	Dharamtar – Dherand	Supreme Petrochem Ltd.	Styrene Monomer (Liquid cargo)	30 years Concession Agreement signed on 29 June 2004

==== Permissions given by MMB ====
Sr. No.	Port	Company	Cargo
1.	Vasai	Good Earth Maritime Pvt. Ltd.	Salt
2.	Vasai-Bhayander	Saurashtra Cement	Bulk Cement
3.	Dabhol	GMR Energy	Coal
4.	Dharamtar – Dherand/Shahapur	Tata Power	Coal
5.	Dharamtar – Shahapur	Reliance Infrastructure Ltd.	Coal

=== Shipyards ===
MMB is encouraging private developers to set up shipyards on the Maharashtra coast. Government offers following incentives:

- MMB offers suitable waterfront to the developers as per the requirements of the project
- Inter-tidal land can be made available to the developers
- If available, Government land can be made available to the developer

==== Shipyards in operation ====
Sr. No.	Port/Location	Company
1.	Usgaon, Dabhol	M/s. Bharati Shipyard Ltd.
2.	Bhagwati Bunder, Ratnagiri	M/s. Bharati Shipyard Ltd.

==== Shipyard permissions given by MMB ====
Sr. No.	Port/Location	Company	Status
1.	Dharamtar, Masad-Khurd	M/s. BHP Engg.	Agreement signed
2.	Dharamtar, Mankule	M/s. SKS Logistics Ltd.	Agreement yet to be signed
3.	Khardi, Palghar, Dist. Thane	M/s. Mech Marine Engrs. P. Ltd.	Agreement yet to be signed
4.	Safale, Palghar, Dist. Thane	M/s. King Prawns Ltd.	Agreement yet to be signed
5.	Belapur, Tal. Panvel, Dist. Raigad	M/s. Maldar Dredgers & Salvagers Pvt. Ltd.	Agreement signed
6.	Tulsunde, Tal. Rajapur, Dist. Ratnagiri	M/s. Safe & Sure Shipyard Ltd.	Agreement yet to be signed
7.	Turumbad, Murud-Janjira Dist. Raigad	M/s. Bombay Marine Engg. Pvt. Ltd.	Agreement yet to be signed
8.	Mankule, Dharamtar	M/s. Amma Lines Ltd.	Agreement yet to be signed
9.	Rajpuri Creek Rohini/ Turumbad	M/s. Das Offshore	Agreement signed
10.	Village Kurul, Alibag	M/s. Konkan Barge Builder Pvt. Ltd.	Agreement yet to be signed

=== Inland Water Transport ===
Maharashtra has 35 creeks and rivers spread across 720 km long coast line. As per available information, approx. 15 million passengers in the coastal districts of the state use Inland Water Transport annually. The State Government has recognized the importance of Inland Water Transport and has tasked MSRDC as the implementing agency for development of passenger jetties on the Western Coast of Mumbai from Nariman Point to Borivali and on the Eastern Coast of Mumbai from South Mumbai to Navi Mumbai. The Government of India, Ministry of Shipping under centrally sponsored scheme for development of inland water transport has approved eight projects in Maharashtra State at an estimated cost of Rs. 30 crores. The sites approved are Vishnupuri and Isapur in district Nanded, and Karanja, Mandwa, Rajpuri, Janjira, Dighi, and Agardanda in district Raigad. These projects are at various stages of implementation. The minor ports of Maharashtra together handled around 130.48 lakh passenger traffic during April to December 2006 of which 118.70 lakh passenger traffic was through mechanised vessels and 12.7 lakh was by non-mechanised vessels. Maharashtra Maritime Board (MMB) is developing the following IWT projects under the Centrally Sponsored Scheme of Ministry of Shipping, GoI and includes:

1. In Godavari River at Vishnupuri, Nanded
2. In Vashishti River (Dabhol Creek) at Dabhol to Dhopave
3. In Savitri River (Bankot Creek) at Veshvi and Bagmandla
4. In Jaigad Creek at Tavsal to Jaigad Port
5. From South Mumbai to Amba River/Dharamtar Creek at Mandwa
6. From South Mumbai to Amba River/Dharamtar Creek at Karanja
7. In Mhasla/Mandad River (Rajpuri Creek) at Rajpuri
8. In Mhasla/Mandad River (Rajpuri Creek) at Janjira Fort
9. In Mhasla / Mandad River (Rajpuri Creek) at Dighi to Agardanda
10. In Mhasla/Mandad River (Rajpuri Creek) at Agardanda to Dighi
11. From South Mumbai to Amba River/Dharamtar Creek at Rewas
12. For eco-tourism project at Isapur, District Nanded, Maharashtra

MMB has also formulated the following projects for IWT development which are under consideration by Ministry of Shipping, Government of India:

- From South Mumbai to Amba river / Dharamtar creek at Rewas
- For eco-tourism project at Isapur, District Nanded, Maharashtra

MMB is also planning to develop passenger water transport projects around Mumbai. Following is the proposed network –

Route	From	To
Western Sea Route	Nariman Point	Borivali
Eastern Sea Route	South Mumbai / Gateway of India	Thane / Navi Mumbai
Cross Harbour Route	Gateway of India / Ferry Wharf / South Mumbai	Mandwa – Rewas, JNPT, Elephanta

=== Marina ===
Marina development is a popular leisure activity throughout the world and reflects the economic development of an area. Due to high-end economic activities in the state, there is huge potential for developing marinas. Marinas attract users of speed boats & yachts and promote tourism. They also give rise to ancillary activities e.g. construction, maintenance facilities and logistic support for leisure activities; which in turn generate employment. Marinas would also help decongest water areas by eliminating un-authorised/ un-organised anchorages.

Short-listed probable sites in and around Mumbai are:

- Mandwa
- Belapur
- Vasai Creek
- Malad Creek
- Dharamtar Creek

=== Tourism & Water Sports ===
Dist. Sindhudurg, especially Malvan has already been declared as a marine park. This site has all the ingredients to be developed into a place of tourist attraction. This area is an ideal location for tourism and water sports activities. In addition, other potential area identified by the investors may also be considered for developing tourism and water sport activities.

- To facilitate tourism and water sports, MMB encourages:
- Utilization of waterfront along the beach areas for tourism activities – in liaison with MTDC
- Promoting water sports in sheltered areas (with due safety for all users)

== Wings of MMB ==
=== Marine Engineering Department ===
Chief Surveyor and Marine Engineer, Maharashtra Maritime Board is the Head of Department of Marine Engineering and Survey Section. This department undertakes Maintenance, Repairs and Operation of Floating Crafts. Currently, Maharashtra Maritime Board has 1 Dredger, 2 Barges, 1 Tug, 1 Mooring launch, 3 Survey Launches and 6 Speed Boats. The Marine Engineering Department looks after designing & acquisition of marine crafts, development of dredging units, and execution of dredging activities. Department also undertakes acquisition and maintenance of navigational aids such as Buoys, Light Buoys, Beacons, Navigational Lights and Storm Warning Signals etc. At present MMB has 47 Light-houses at various ports, 29 Navigational Buoys in navigational channels and 37 Storm warning signals to assist the fishermen, passenger traffic and commercial ships at various ports. Under Inland Vessel Act 1917, this department conducts surveys, inspections and certification of vessels. It also conducts examinations for granting Certificates of Competency as 1st Class Master, 2nd Class Master, Serang, Engineer, 1st Class Engine Driver and 2nd Class Engine Driver, after the applicants secure requisite I.V. service for appearing these examinations.

==== Survey under Inland Vessel Act, 1917 ====
Survey of Inland Vessels is conducted by the Chief Surveyor and Marine Engineer of the MMB. Inspection of I.V.s plying in inland waterways is carried out for checking their performance and suitability i.e. sea-keeping aspects in sheltered waters.

On payment of government prescribed fees by an applicant, MMB Surveyor boards a vessel for a reasonable time to inspect the vessel's structure, machinery, equipments and appliances viz. life saving appliances, fire fighting equipments and navigational aids, underwater hull inspection reports, and certificates of Master and Engine Driver. Surveyor also conducts enquiry in case of an accident.

The approved (by a Naval Architect) drawings and plans of the craft, which is under construction and intending to ply in inland waterways, throughout all its construction stages and final reports of trial of the vessel for seaworthiness, inclining experiment for stability, are to be sent for inspection by the MMB Surveyor.

If the surveyor is fully satisfied as to all the requirements having been complied with, and defects on the vessel, if any, is rectified to his full satisfaction, then he issues a declaration of survey to the applicant and also issues temporary certificate of survey.

The applicant on receipt of the declaration of survey delivers the papers (all copies of Life Saving Equipments, Fire Fighting Appliances and Master's & Driver's certificates along with the declaration ) to the O/o Chief Surveyor and Marine Engineer and takes the delivery of Certificate of Survey within 7 days. Unless specifically requested by the applicant, Certificate of Survey is not transmitted by post.

=== Hydrographic Department ===
Hydrographer is the Head of the Hydrographic department within the MMB. Various hydrographic studies are carried out under his supervision.

These studies help establish need for dredging in the identified areas. He undertakes pre and post Hydrographic Surveys for dredging requirements and has a data bank of over 1150 bathymetric charts, which are made available to the users on payment.

He also undertakes surveys related to navigational safety and port development, provides bathymetric data for all potential sites for planning and execution of various projects, and undertakes the work of publication of Tides every year. The Hydrographic Department has three full-fledged survey parties which are equipped with latest hydrographic equipment like Differential Global Positioning System (DGPS), dual frequency echo sounders, current meters, automatic tide gauge, digital level & HYPACK Hydrographic Software.

=== Civil Engineering Department ===
- Responsible for construction, maintenance and repairs of all types of civil constructions of MMB.
- Undertakes construction of new buildings and port infrastructure
- Works undertaken through MMB's own funds.
- 62 works worth Rs.9.55 crores are in progress.
- Annual Budget of Rs.14 crores provided by MMB.
- Around 300 passenger jetties - Detailed survey being undertaken to confirm present status.

==== Coastal Protection Works ====
- Coastal Protection Works are carried out through Coastal Engineer under PWD and funds are provided through DPDC (Rs.15-20 crores)
- There is no State Level Scheme to provide for coastal protection.
- Out of total 720 km of coastline, 400.49 km is naturally protected and 141.84 km has been artificially protected. The remaining 177.67 km is vulnerable to erosion and needs to be protected is proposed. Funds required to protect 177.67 km is Rs.1322 crores over next 15 years. A State Level Scheme
- Maintenance funds are not provided till date. So, Rs.30 crores per year for next three years and thereafter Rs.15 crores per year are required.

=== Regional Port Offices ===
The list of offices are as follows:

Main Office: Office of Chief Executive Officer and Office of Chief Port Officer	Indian Mercantile Chambers, 3rd Floor, 14, Ramjibhai Kamani Marg, Ballard Estate, Mumbai 400 038.
Hydrographer	Govind Patil Marg, Khardanda, Mumbai 400 053, Telefax: 91-22-26044274. Email: hydro@hathway.com
Marine Engineer	Dadabhai Navroji Road, Opp. Bhawans college, PWD Compound, Andheri(W), Mumbai 400058.
Regional Port Office (Bandra)	Govind Patil Marg, Khardanda, Mumbai 400 053, Telefax: 91-22-26490873
Regional Port Office (Mora)	Chendani Koliwada, Thana (east)
Regional Port Office (Murud-Janjira)	Taluka Alibaug, Raigad district
Regional Port Office (Ratnagiri)	Mandvi, Ratnagiri district 415612
Regional Port Office (Vengurla)	At & Post Vengurla, Sindhudurg district

== See also ==
- Ports in India
- Official Website of Maharashtra Maritime Board
