= Chondhi =

Chondi is the name of several villages in India, including:

- Chondhi, Alibag in the Alibag subdistrict, Raigad district, Maharashtra
- Chondhi, Yavatmal in the Yavatmal district, Maharashtra
