= 1947 Ramdas ship disaster =

Indian passenger ferry that sank in 1947

Coordinates: 18.91°N 72.81°E

History

India
- Name: SS Ramdas
- Owner: Indian Cooperative Steam Navigation Company
- Port of registry: Bombay
- Route: Bombay to Rewas
- Launched: 1936
- Stricken: 17 July 1947
- Fate: Sank; killing 690 of the people on board

The 1947 Ramdas ship disaster occurred near Bombay (now Mumbai) in India. The Indian passenger ship SS Ramdas, while bound for Rewas in Maharashtra, capsized on 17 July 1947, near Gull Island (Kashyacha Khadak), ten miles from Colaba (South Mumbai) Point, killing 724 of the people on board.

== The disaster ==
Ramdas was a coastal passenger ferry owned by the Indian Cooperative Steam Navigation Company. It was a twin-screw vessel built in 1936 and measured 406 tons. On 17 July 1947, at around 8:05 a.m. (IST), 30 minutes after she left Bombay, and at 5 miles (8.0 km) Colaba Point, while en route to Rewas, she was caught in violent storms and high seas. While she was passing the island of Kashyacha Khadak, one of the waves caught her on the starboard side, resulting in the passengers rushing to the port side and causing her to capsize.

The port authorities knew of the tragedy only when a few of the survivors swam to safety and reached the Sassoon Docks and broke the news at 3:00 p.m. Some of the survivors swam across and reached the northern coast of Raigad near Rewas. Some people were rescued by fishermen from Rewas.

Of the 713 passengers on board, 690 died. Most passengers were from the Girgaum and Parel areas. They were mostly workers from Pen, Roha, and Alibag. Survivors included the ship's captain, Sheikh Suleman Ibrahim, who later provided the facts of the incident.

== Aftermath ==
For the rescue operation mounted by the Rewas (Alibag) fishermen, the Indian government allotted some land and a jetty to them. The resulting settlement was subsequently called Bodni.

The Bombay Port Trust decided to salvage it in August 1951 and the work was entrusted to an Italian firm for a cost of ₹13.8 lakh. However, the wreck resurfaced on its own at Ballard Pier off the coast at Bombay in 1957.
