= Gangavalli River =

River in Karnataka, India

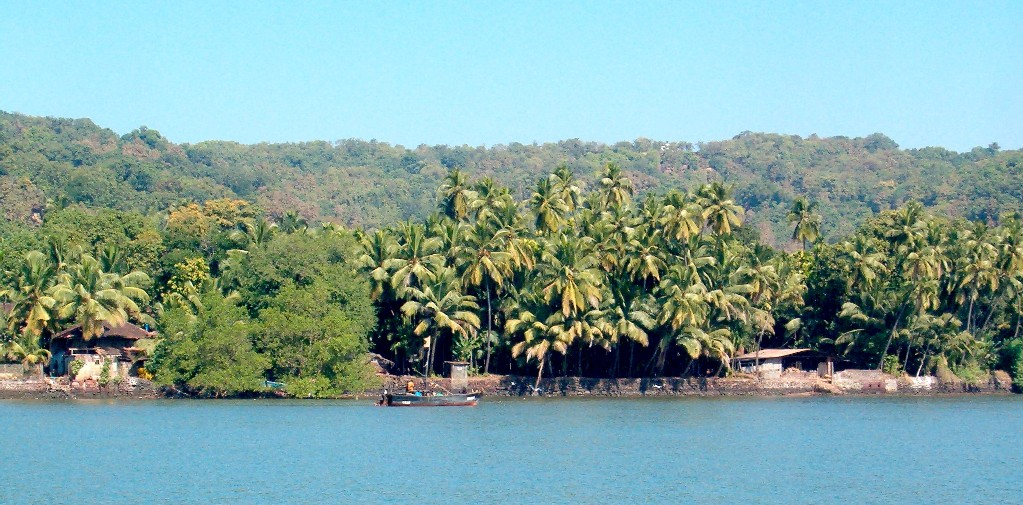
A typical view.

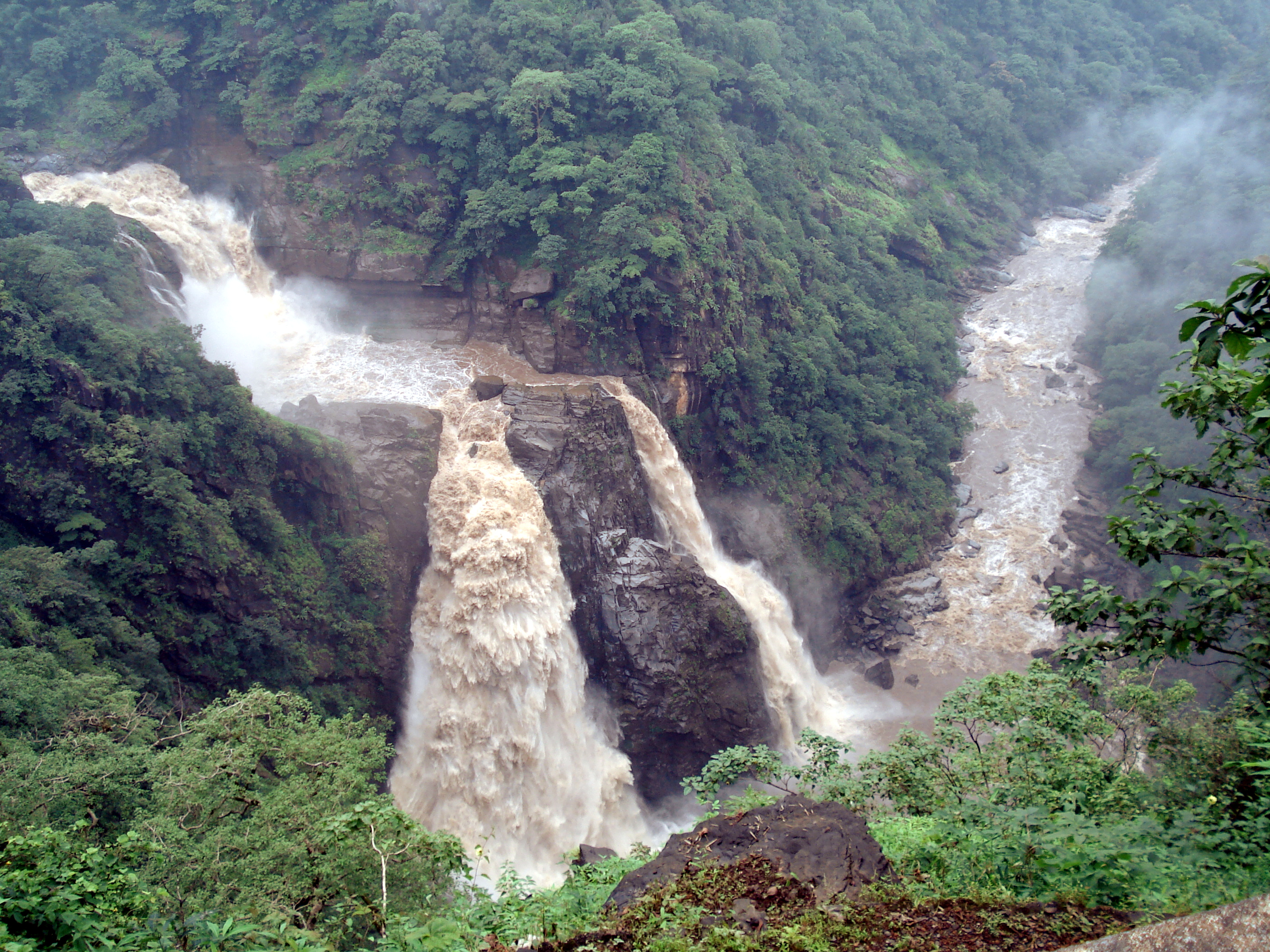
Magod Falls a part of Ganagvali River

Gangavalli River is one of the many small rivers that originates and flows entirely within the western part of the state of Karnataka in India. The National Highway 66 (India) continues on the Hosur Bridge the bridge built over Gangavali River and the road continues to split the Ankola and Kumta regions to connect Uttar Kannada district to Dharwar and Mangalore area.

== Origin and topography ==
Gangavalli River (also called Bedthi River) originates from the Western Ghats the south of Dharwad (Near Someshwara temple) as Shalmala and flows in the west direction to meet the Arabian Sea just after the Ganga temple. Here the River embraces the name Gangavalli from the Goddess Ganga; the village in this area carries the same name Gangavalli. This stream joins at Kalghatgi about 30 km (19 mi) lower down to the Bedthi River that takes its birth near Hubli. River then flows west and then south-west for a total distance of 69 km. This river has a catchment area of 3,574 km^{2} (1,380 sq mi) and has a total length of 152 km (94 mi). On its course towards the Arabian Sea, the river falls from a height of 180 metre at a point called Magod. Manjaguni a new resort place on the western face of the Sahyadri, is significant and picturesque at the confluence of the river and the Arabian Sea during the low and high tides during full moons.

The bed fall of the river is gentle for the first 72 km (45 mi). After that point the river bed falls rapidly with a clear over fall of 183 m (600 ft) at Magod and is popularly known as The Magod Falls. Afterwards river runs in deep gorges with a steep bed falls. The Sonda (the tributary of Bedhi River) joins the river after the falls. The Ganagavalli village is 11 km (7 mi) away from the Ankola town and 4 km from Belambar. One of the other new resort areas of the Uttar Kannada district, Gokarna town is 4 km away in the other direction on Gangavalli road. The river flows through Dharwad and Uttar Kannada districts. The river has dense evergreen and semi-evergreen forests along its path.

== Tributaries ==
Bedthi, Shalmali and Sonda

== Geology ==
Soils in the Gangavalli basin are mainly laterite in origin and tend to be reddish to brownish in colour. The various type of soil found here is golden sand, clay loamy, clayey, clayey-skeletal, and loamy.

== Climate ==
=== Rainfall ===
With a major part of the river lying in the Western Ghats, the Ganagavalli river basin receives a large amount of rainfall. Mean annual rainfall ranges from 1,700 mm (67 in) to 6,000 mm (240 in). About 95% of the rainfall is received during the month of June to September (July being the rainiest) when the southwest monsoon is at its climax. There is some rainfall in the post monsoon season in the form of thundershowers mostly during October and some rainfall also occurs during the summer months of April and May. During heavy monsoons, the river floods to nearby villages and dumps dirt and dead animals to lands creating havoc to villagers.

=== Temperature ===
April is usually the hottest month with the mean daily maximum temperature at 36˚C and the mean daily minimum at 22˚C.

=== Humidity ===
During the morning, the relative humidity exceeds 75% for most times of the year. During the months of monsoon, the relative humidity during the afternoons is approximately 60%. During the driest months (January to March), the relative humidity in the afternoon is less than 35%.

== See also ==
- Ports of Karnataka
