= Bodni =

Village in Maharashtra

- Village
- Location within Maharashtra
- Coordinates: 18.88°N 72.95°E
- Country: India
- State: Maharashtra
- District: Raigad
- Established: 1947
- Elevation: 1 m (3.3 ft)

Population (2011)
  - Total: 921

Languages
  - Official: Marathi
- Time zone: UTC+5:30 (IST)
- PIN CODE: 402 201
- Telephone code: 02141

Bodni is a fishing village located on the northern coast of Raigad district, Maharashtra, India.

== Geography ==
Bodni is located on the northern tip of Alibag district of Maharashtra on the west coast of India. It is flanked to the east by the Mothebal Mangrove Forest and to the west by Rewas. It is administratively a part of the Rewas-Bodni town.

== History ==
The history of Bodni is connected to the 1947 sinking of the ferry Ramdas. Some of the survivors of this incident swam across and reached the northern coast of Raigad near Rewas and settled here. They took up the profession of fishing, built houses and the settlement was subsequently called Bodni.
