= National Highway 166D (India) =

National Highway in India

National Highway 166D

Route information
- Auxiliary route of NH 66
- Length: 33.3 km (20.7 mi)

Major junctions
- West end: Pen
- East end: Madh

Location
- Country: India
- States: Maharashtra

Highway system
- Roads in India; Expressways; National; State; Asian
← NH 66	→ NH 548A

National Highway 166D, commonly referred to as NH 166D is a national highway in India. It is a secondary route of National Highway 66. NH-166D runs in the state of Maharashtra in India.

== Route ==
NH166D connects Pen, Ransai and Madh in the state of Maharashtra.

== Junctions ==
NH 66 Terminal near Pen.
NH 548A Terminal near Madh.

== See also ==
- List of national highways in India
- List of national highways in India by state
