= National Highway 548A (India) =

National highway in India

National Highway 548A
- Map of National Highway 548A in red

Route information
- Auxiliary route of NH 48
- Length: 168 km (104 mi)

Major junctions
- North end: Shahapur
- South end: Agardanda

Location
- Country: India
- States: Maharashtra

Highway system
- Roads in India; Expressways; National; State; Asian
← NH 848	→ NH 66

National Highway 548A, commonly referred to as NH 548A is a national highway in India. It is a spur road of National Highway 48. NH-548A traverses the state Maharashtra in India.

== Route ==
Shahapur, Murbad, Karjat, Khalapur, Pali, Roha, Tala, Mandad, Agardanda.

== Junctions ==
NH 848 Terminal near Shahapur.
NH 66 near Nagothana.

== See also ==
- List of national highways in India
- List of national highways in India by state
