= Kihim =

Village in Maharashtra

- Village
- Location within Maharashtra
- Coordinates: 18.7286°N 72.8676°E
- Country: India
- State: Maharashtra
- District: Raigad
- Taluka: Alibag

Population (2011)
  - Total: 2,582

Languages
  - Official: Marathi
- Time zone: UTC+5:30 (IST)
- PIN CODE: 402 201
- Telephone code: 02141

Kihim is a small village located to the north of Alibag. Commonly known to people in Mumbai as a weekend getaway, it is accessible via Road and Water. It forms part of the string of beach hamlets along the coast of Alibag taluka collectively called as Hamptons of Mumbai mainly due to the elite property owners, including businessmen, sports persons and Bollywood personalities, in the area.

== History ==
Kihim evolved as a village in the 17th century during the era of Sarkhel Kanhoji Aangre, the Koli naval chief of King Shivaji's Kingdom. It formed part of the then known as "Ashtagare" (or Eight Villages).

== Climate and Geography ==
Kihim has a typical sub-tropical climate found across the western coast of India with heavy rainfall during Monsoon. Winters are moderate and Summers are hot and humid. The village is surrounded by Arabian sea on the west, a creek on the north, Navgaon village on the south and Chondhi settlement towards the east.

== Demographics ==
Population of Kihim stood at 2,582 according to the 2011 Census, with Male population at 1,285 (49.76%) and Female at 1,297 (50.23%). Literacy is 78% (Male: 81.17%, Female: 74.48%).

Almost everyone in this village follow Hinduism and speak Marathi as their mother tongue. The language has a limited influence of Agri and Koli dialects and hence may not be fully understandable at few times to visitors who are either used to clearer Marathi or are non-Marathi speakers.

== Economy ==
Kihim mostly thrives on Tourism throughout the year with November to May being peak months. Farming is another major occupation found here. Rice is the main produce of the area like majority of the Konkan region. Coconut and Betel nut is also produced on a large scale.

Chondhi is the nearest marketplace which is dotted with a few restaurants, departmental stores and banks.

== Tourism ==
Though Kihim was once known as a "Bird Watchers' Paradise", very few exotic species can be still found in the areas having dense cover of trees. Variety of butterflies are also found here. Most common bird sightings include, Red-vented Bulbul, Oriental Magpie Robin, Orange-headed Thrush, Baya Weaver, Green bee-eaters, Common Myna and Asian Koel. Less common sightings include Greater Coucal, Black-rumped Flameback Woodpecker, Plum and Grey Headed Parakeets and Black-hooded Oriole. If you are near a water source, you might see a White-throated Kingfisher or an Egret.

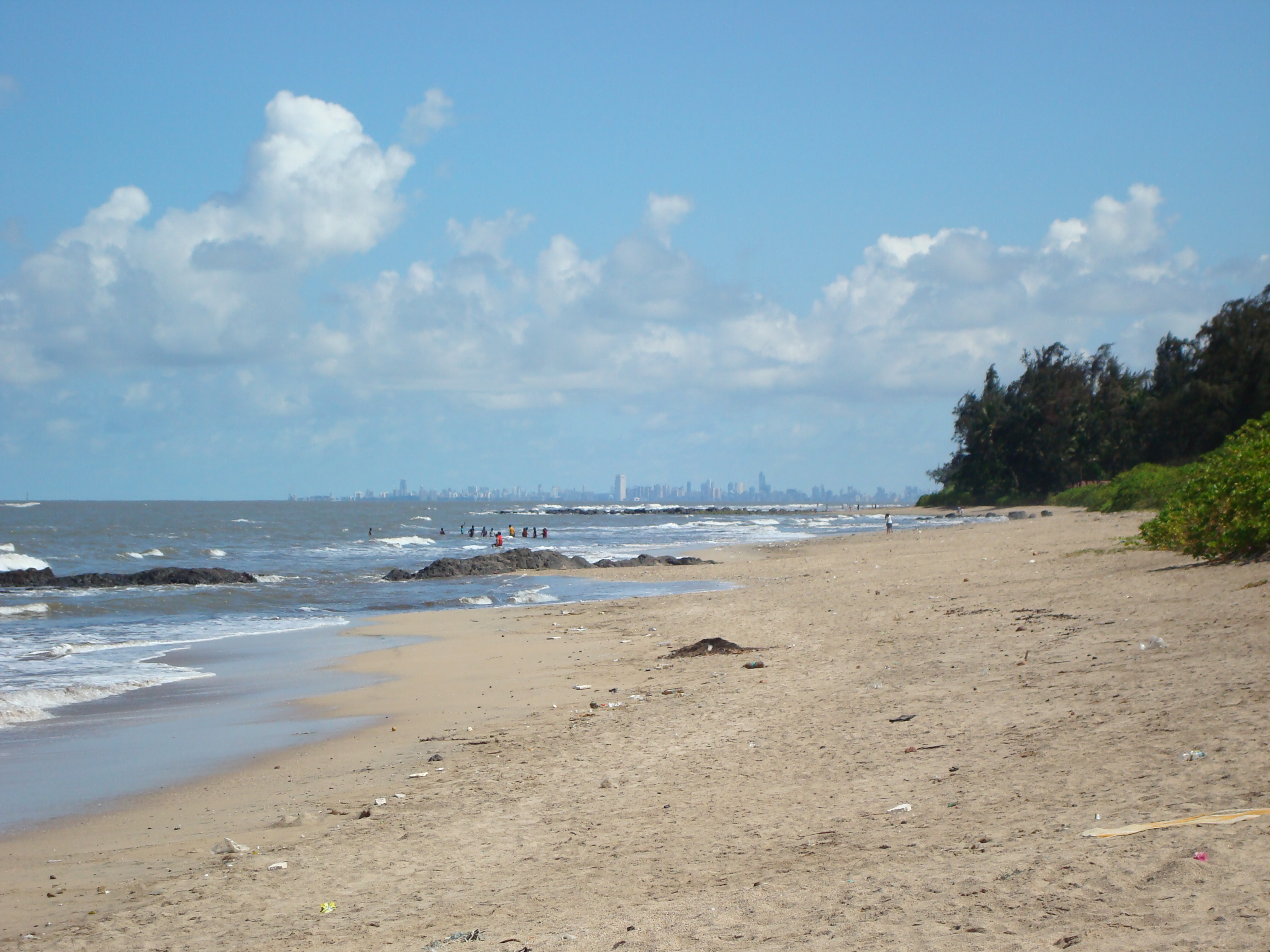
On a clear day Colaba area of Mumbai is visible from Kihim Beach on the north western side.

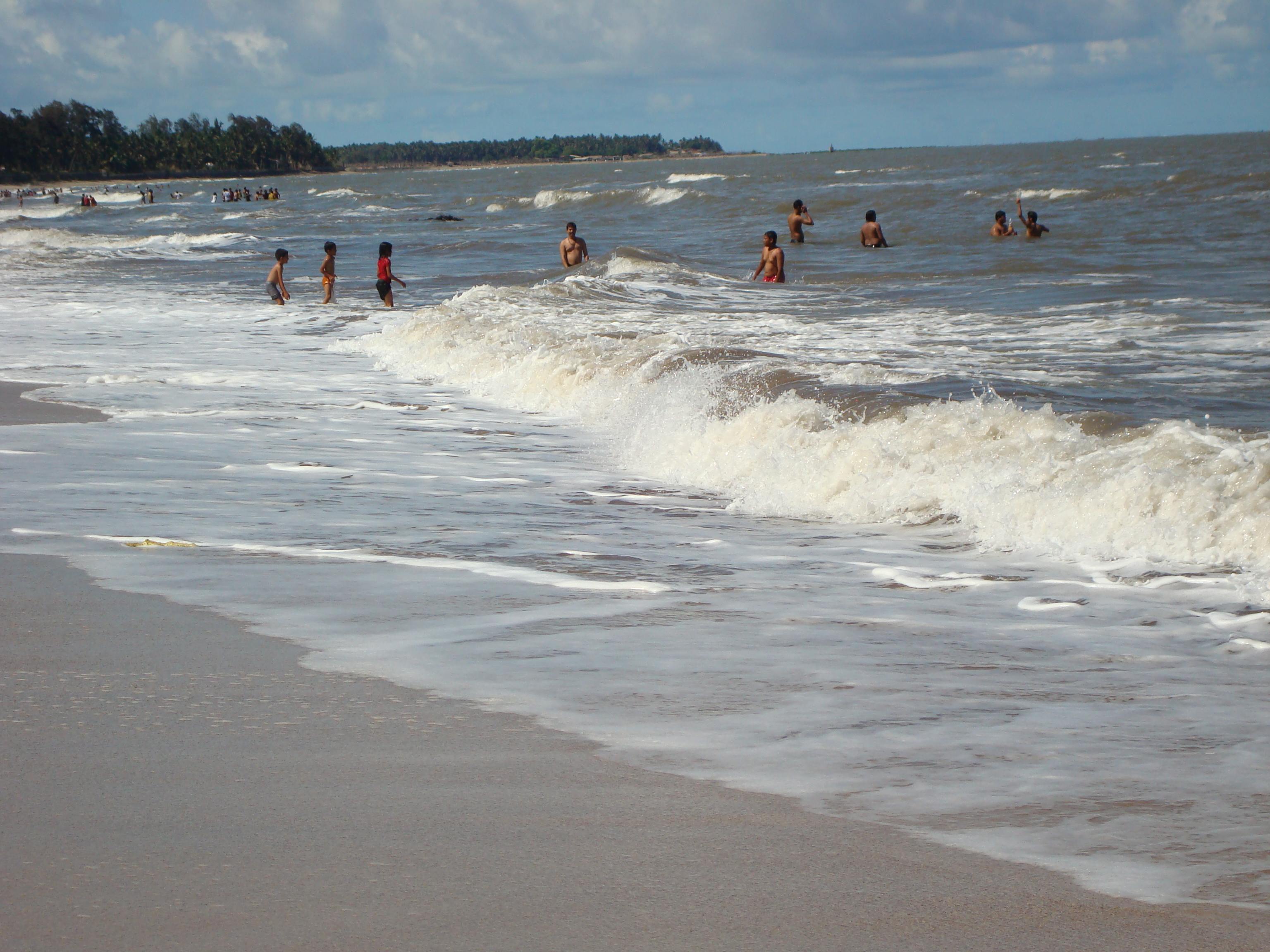
Tourists enjoying in the waves on a sunny day on Kihim Beach

Tourist facilities here mainly consist of "Bed and Breakfast Schemes" run by the locals under the regulations of Maharashtra Tourism Development Corporation, which acts as a governing body for Tourism throughout the State of Maharashtra. One can easily find average quality lodging and boarding facilities throughout the village, except for the month of December when advance bookings may be required. For restaurants and marketplaces, one has to go to a nearby locality known as Chondhi.

Food is substantially dominated by rice and fish preparations.

Other nearby attractions for visitors include the Kihim Pond, Kankeshwar Temple near Mapgaon and Karmarkar Museum in Sasawane. Kihim is also home to various temples which are dotted throughout the village. These include a rare Kalbhairav temple, recently rebuilt Gaodevi (a recently rebuilt Gaodevi (Chamunda) temple) temple and the Bhileshwar temple overlooking the Kihim Pond.

The beach is spread across the western fringe of the village.

The famous "Birdman of India" Dr. Salim Ali spent a short period of his life in Kihim; a museum is being set up in the village after him.

Alibag town is located approximately 11 km south of Kihim.

== Administration ==
Kihim acts as a Group Gram Panchayat for few small villages like Kamath, Chondhi and Bamansure. The village is locally divided into various neighborhoods; namely, Khore, Angshe Ali, Brahmin Ali, Bazar Peth, Bhandar Ali, Mhatre Ali, Bhombad, Sri Nagar and Sai Nagar (also known as Navedar Kihim). The village forms part of the extended MMRDA region and falls under Green Zone-II.

== Education ==
"Sadashiv Mahadev Wadke Vidyalaya" is a major educational institution in the area which provides facilities right from Kindergarten to Graduation. Not only from Kihim, but children from surrounding villages and towns also attend here. Kihim also has a Zilla Parishad run Primary school.

== Transport ==
- Road: Kihim is well connected to Alibag by road. MSRTC buses run to and from Alibag few times a day. It can also be accessed from Mumbai via NH-17 and then a state route connecting from Wadkhal. The distance is approximately 94 km from Mumbai. From Pune, Kihim is accessible forking out from Khopoli onto the state route leading towards Alibag after taking NH-4. Distance is approximately 144 km. Passenger ferry terminals like Mandwa (11 km) and Rewas (15 km) are also connected to Kihim via road. Auto Rickshaws are readily available everywhere for local travel, but the fares are not regulated. It's a common practice to decide the fare before hand to avoid bargaining later. One can also travel to Chondhi (1.5 km) as more frequent buses and autos are available from here for Alibag, Mandwa and Rewas.
- Railways: The nearest railway station is at Pen, which is approximately 30 km away.
- Ferry: Passenger boat services are available from Mandwa Jetty to Gateway of India and from Rewas to Bhaucha Dhakka in Mumbai throughout the year, except for Monsoon. Around mid 2020, a Ro-Pax ferry service was started between the new terminal adjoining the existing Ferry Wharf and Mandwa. This allows the larger vehicles including cars and vans to cross over the bay within an hour.
