= Adani Ports & SEZ =

Indian multinational port operator and logistics company pvt ltd

Adani Ports and Special Economic Zone Limited
- Formerly: Mundra Port and Special Economic Zone Limited
- Type: Public
- Traded as: BSE: 532921; NSE: ADANIPORTS; NSE NIFTY 50 constituent; BSE SENSEX constituent
- ISIN: INE742F01042
- Industry: Infrastructure
- Founded: 26 May 1998; 28 years ago
- Founder: Gautam Adani
- Headquarters: Adani House, Navarangpura, Ahmedabad, Gujarat, India
- Area served: Worldwide
- Key people: Gautam Adani (chairman); Karan Adani (MD); Ashwani Gupta (Whole-Time Director & CEO)
- Products: Port operator; Ports and shipping; Maritime transport; Logistics; Dredging
- Revenue: ▲₹32,383 crore (US$3.5 billion) (2025)
- Operating income: ▲₹19,025 crore (US$2.0 billion) (2025)
- Net income: ▲₹11,061 crore (US$1.2 billion) (2025)
- Total assets: ▲₹1.35 lakh crore (US$14 billion) (2025)
- Total equity: ▲₹64,973 crore (US$6.9 billion) (2025)
- Number of employees: 2,919 (2024)
- Parent: Adani Group
- Subsidiaries: Adani Logistics; Sarguja Rail Corridor
- Website: www.adaniports.com
- Footnotes; Financials as of 31 March 2025.

Adani Ports and Special Economic Zone Limited (APSEZ) is an Indian multinational port operator and logistics company, part of Adani Group. It is India's largest private port operator with a network of 12 ports and terminals, including India's first port-based SEZ at Mundra and the first deep water transshipment port at Thiruvananthapuram. The company has attracted controversies for cronyism, alleged stock manipulation and violation of environmental norms.

== Operations ==
As of 2017, APSEZ operated 3 inland container depots (ICD) through its subsidiary Adani Logistics Ltd. In August 2022, they acquired an additional ICD from Navkar Corporation in Tumb, Gujarat.

It holds Category 1 License for the Indian Railways that helps in pan-India cargo movement. The trains owned by Adani Logistics were used to dispatch 30,000 tonnes of food grains to feed over 60 lakh citizens across the states of Tamil Nadu, Karnataka, West Bengal, and Maharashtra, during the 2020 COVID-19 lockdown.

APSEZ provides dredging and reclamation solutions, primarily for port and harbor construction. The Adani Group started investing in developing a dredging fleet in 2005. As of 2018, APSEZ operated a fleet of 19 dredgers, the largest capital dredging fleet in India.

APSEZ has undertaken mangrove afforestation activities totalling 2885 Ha (as of August 2018) with a survival rate of over 85%. In 2016, the company announced that all ports and townships were being prepared to run on 100% renewable energy by 2018 using a mix of solar and wind energy.

In August 2017, a Morgan Stanley analysis described APSEZ as "stacking up well compared to its global peers: On operating metrics such as revenue growth, margins, EBIDTA growth, net income growth and return ratios (RoCE/ RoE), and based on bottom-up estimates by Morgan Stanley analysts covering global ports, APSEZ is expected to be in the top quartile across various operating metrics despite the tax holiday for Mundra port coming to an end".

Private equity firm Warburg Pincus acquired a 0.49% stake in Adani Ports for ₹800 crore (US$85 million) on 7 March 2021.

In April 2022, it was announced that APSEZ (through its subsidiary, The Adani Harbour Services Ltd.) had acquired the third-party marine services provider, Ocean Sparkle Ltd.

In July 2022, APSEZ alongside the Gadot Group won the privatisation bid for Israel's Port of Haifa for US$1.18 billion. Where Adani Ports and Gadot Group respectively hold 70%:30% of the shares.

In September 2022, Adani Ports secured a US$3.1 billion deep-sea port construction project with the West Bengal government.

According to the Business Standard report, In the fiscal year 2023–24, APSEZ managed 420 million metric tonnes (MMT) of cargo, marking a 24% growth. Additionally, APSEZ represents 44% of India's containerized seaborne cargo.

In March 2024, APSEZ revealed its acquisition of Gopalpur port in Odisha, situated on India's east coast. The acquisition involved purchasing a 56% stake from the Shapoorji Pallonji Group and a 39% stake from Orissa Stevedores Limited in Gopalpur Port Limited, valued at Rs 3,080 crore. In July 2024, the ratings agency ICRA has upgraded the rating of Adani Ports and Special Economic Zone (APSEZ) to AAA/Stable from AA+/Stable.

APSEZ has plans to construct a new port in Da Nang, Vietnam. The proposal got “in-principle approval” from the Vietnamese government. The port will feature container terminals and multipurpose berths to handle wide varieties of cargo. The other foreign ports Managed by the company include Haifa, Israel; Colombo, Sri Lanka; and the Port of Dar es Salaam, Tanzania.

In August 2024, APSEZ announced acquisition of 80% stake in Astro Offshore for $185 million. This move will help add to its roster of Tier-1 customers.

== Ports and terminals ==
The company commenced operations at Mundra Port and currently operates 15 ports across all Indian states. Its ports have 45 berths and 14 terminals.

=== Vizhinjam International Seaport Thiruvananthapuram (Trivandrum Seaport) ===
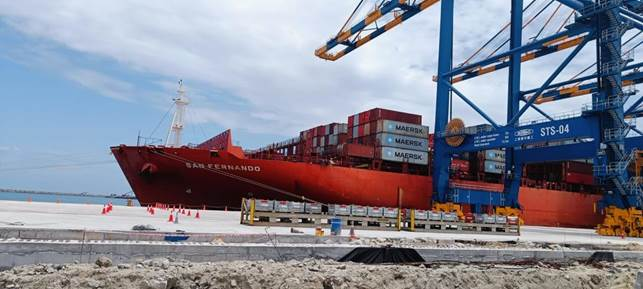
Vizhinjam International Seaport Thiruvananthapuram

APSEZ won a bid with the Kerala government to construct the Vizhinjam International Seaport Thiruvananthapuram in 2015. While the initial completion date was projected for 2020 the construction has experienced multiple delays due to the COVID-19 pandemic and cyclones. Adani sought an extension to 2024 but this led to disputes with the Kerala government.

=== Mundra Port ===
Mundra Port is a deep-water, all-weather, berthing on arrival port in the Gulf of Kutch. With 26 berths and dedicated terminals for different cargo and commodity types, it has an annual capacity to handle 231 MMT cargo. The port is connected to National Highway (NH) network through State Highways 48 via Anjar and SH-6. It has a privately developed rail network of 69 km connecting Adipur to Mundra port, which in-turn provides nationwide connectivity. It is capable of berthing fully loaded Capesize vessels, VLCC and ULCC. It handles dry bulk, break bulk, project cargo, liquid, containers, automobiles, and crude.

Since 2013, Mundra Port is India's largest private commercial port and hosts the world's largest coal import terminal. Mundra Port was known for introducing technological advancements that led to a high level of automation to enhance the efficiency of cargo handling.

As of August 2016, approximately 20,000 ships had docked at Mundra. Mundra Port had two single-point mooring (SPM) facilities to evacuate crude oil. Efforts to build a new container terminal in Mundra in partnership with French shipping giant CMA Terminals were underway as of January 2017.

=== West Port ===
The West Port is mainly designed for coal import and export. To meet the rising demand for coal at Mundra, the Adani Group decided to invest in berth-3 at its West Port and associated coal handling plant including 2x1.36 km long conveyors (ARD-5, ARD-6). This translated into 16.5 MTPA handling of additional coal per annum. Mainly designed by Larsen & Toubro.

=== Krishnapatnam Port ===
Krishnapatnam Port Company Limited (KPCL) is a multi-cargo facility port located near Nellore, Andhra Pradesh. KPCL was acquired by Adani Ports in October 2020 for ₹13,000 crore (equivalent to ₹170 billion or US$1.8 billion in 2026) from the CVR Group. Originally, they had a 75% stake but by April 2021 they acquired the remaining 25% stake from Vishwasmudra Holdings.

=== Karaikal Port ===
Around May 2021, Adani Ports and Special Economic Zone Ltd (APSEZ) was looking to buy Karaikal port in Puducherry at a valuation of ₹1,500-2,000 crore but multiple sources said that the deal is “not easy” to consummate given the ownership structure and the debt.

However, by April 2023, APSEZ completed the acquisition of Karaikal Port, which is an all-weather deep water port developed in an area of 611 acres and commissioned in April 2009.

=== Hazira Port ===
The Hazira Port is a deep-water port located in the Gulf of Khambat, Surat, Gujarat. The port has been operational since 2005 and is a strategic port for Shell Energy India. Adani developed additional container jetties and multipurpose jetties. However, in 2016, APSEZ faced setbacks to further development due to environmental complaints from the Hazira Fishermen Committee.

=== Dhamra Port ===
Dhamra Port, Bhadrak, Odisha is a deep-water, all-weather, multi-user, a multi-cargo port located between Haldia and Paradeep ports on India's eastern coast. It was acquired by Adani in 2014 for Rs 5,500 crore which was the largest port sector deal at the time. It can handle dry bulk, breakbulk, project cargo, and containers. It has an annual capacity of 40 MMT cargo which can go up to 100 MMT in the future. It is located near the mineral belts of Odisha, Jharkhand, and West Bengal. It is connected by a 62 km railway line to Ranital Link Cabin which connects the main Howrah-Chennai line. It features a fully integrated conveyor system for import and export, a coastal circuit for fast cargo transit, and rapid loading silos with 4000 TPH capacity. Situated between Haldia in West Bengal and Paradip in Odisha, the Port is located 215 km from Bhubaneshwar. The port serves as a gateway to Nepal, Bangladesh, Myanmar and the entire geopolitical region, including the ASEAN region.

=== Dahej Port ===
The Dahej Port is a deep-water, multi-cargo port in the Gulf of Khambat, Bharuch, Gujarat. It houses two dry and breaks bulk berths and dedicated facilities for handling project cargo. It has a capacity to handle 2 crore (20 million) tonnes per year. It handles all kinds of dry bulk and breakbulk cargo including coal, fertiliser, Agri products, steel cargo, and minerals. Additionally, it is capable of berthing capesize and Panama vessels. Dahej Port has a dedicated railway line that connects to the national railway network and it is also connected to National Highway 8. It is connected to the contiguous industrial hubs of Gujarat, Maharashtra and eastern Madhya Pradesh.

Dahej Port is equipped with India's first high speed elevated triangular gallery overload conveying system for coal transportation which reduces dust pollution. It accommodates a Ro-Ro Jetty for project cargo movement of 9.8 km long fully integrated high-speed conveyor.

=== Gangavaram Port ===
Adani Ports announced on 3 March 2021 that it had acquired a 31.5% stake in Gangavaram Port from Windy Lakeside Investment, an affiliate of Warburg Pincus, for ₹1,954 crore (US$240 million).

Adani Ports may acquire a 58.1% stake in Gangavaram Port from DVS Raju Group, for undisclosed amount

=== Vizag Terminal ===
APSEZ formerly owned a coal terminal in the Visakhapatnam Port. In 2022, only a few years into a 30-year contract they returned it to the Visakhapatnam Port Authority.

=== Mormugao Terminal ===
Mormugao Terminal is a one-berth terminal located on the south-west coast of India. It has a capacity of 7 MMT cargo. It can handle coal cargo, Panamax and capsize vessels. Its main feature is a mechanized material handling system of conveyor systems and stacker cum reclaimers. It is connected to Maharashtra and Karnataka hinterlands via South Central Railways and Konkan Railways.

=== Kattupalli Port ===
Kattupalli Port lies 24 km north of Chennai Port and can handle 18 MMT cargo, including containers, breakbulk, and project cargo. It can berth fully loaded Capesize vessels and container vessels. It has a DPD warehouse within the container for movement of AEO and DPD consignments and a 45,000 sq. ft. warehouse with off-dock CFS. Kattupalli Port is connected to all CFSs/ICDs/SEZs in Chennai for imports and exports.

=== Kamarajar Port ===
Kamarajar Port (formerly known as Ennore Port) is a container terminal located in the northern suburbs of Chennai. It can handle 12 MMT cargo. It is connected to the hinterland by roads, including the upcoming EMRIP project and Northern Port Access Road.

=== Tuna Terminal ===
In 2012, the Kandla Port Trust (KPT), longtime operator of Kandla Port (20 km to the northeast of Tuna Tekra) proposed to improve access for larger vessels by authorizing construction of a modern, four-berth, deep draft terminal at Tuna Tekra. Kandla Port reached an agreement with Adani Ports & SEZ for construction of a new, mechanized, four-berth terminal with direct unloading facilities for coal, iron ore, and other dry bulk goods.

Tuna Port is an all-weather, berthing on arrival port with the largest coal import terminal of 35,000 MT/Day discharge rate near Kandla Port. It has a capacity of 2 crore (20 million) tonnes per year and can handle 1,30,00 DWT vessels at berth. It can handle all kinds of dry bulk and breakbulk cargo including coal, fertilizer, agri-products, steel cargo, and minerals, and it is equipped with a fully integrated high-speed conveyor system. It is connected to National Highway (NH) 8A.

=== Agardana Shipyard & Terminals ===
Agardanda Terminal is an under construction 1,50,000 MT Container terminal located in Agardanda, Maharashtra which was previously built as a shipyard and container terminal under the agreement with the Maharashtra Maritime Board, State Government of Maharashtra. Adani took over the project in 2021.

=== Dighi Port ===
Dighi Port was acquired by APSEZ in February 2021, with the intention of being an alternative to the Jawaharlal Nehru Port, in Navi Mumbai.

=== Gopalpur port ===
In March 2024, Adani Ports and Special Economic Zone announced the acquisition of a 95% stake in Gopalpur port, located in Odisha, for approximately $162 million. This strategic move aims to enhance Adani Ports' presence along India's east coast. Gopalpur Port, handling a diverse mix of dry bulk cargo such as iron ore, coal, limestone, ilmenite, and alumina, is set to join Adani's expansive port network. This acquisition further supports Adani's goal to achieve cargo volume parity between India's eastern and western coasts and bolsters its integrated logistics framework.

== Awards and recognition ==
In 2019, the organisation won an 'Honorary Special Mention' award at the first-ever National Corporate Responsibility (CSR) Award ceremony. The award was presented by Finance Minister Nirmala Sitharaman and her deputy, Anurag Thakur.

== Controversies ==
=== Violation of environmental norms ===
A committee chaired by Sunita Narain of the Centre for Science and Environment, was set up by the Union Ministry of Environment and Forests to inspect the ship-breaking facility of APSEZ near Mundra West Port in Gujarat's Kutch district. The committee, which submitted its report on 18 April 2013, found incontrovertible evidence of destruction, blocking of creeks, and non-compliance of other clearance conditions. Subsequently, on 29 July 2013, a public hearing for the project was held where people from four project-affected villages and nearby locations attended the public hearing at Tunda village in Mundra taluka and posed questions about the project and its impact on the environment. The public hearing was successfully completed with the answers to each question asked by villagers. APSEZ was fines Rs 200 crore by the Ministry of Environment and Forests.

=== Myanmar activities ===
On 30 March 2021, the group of activists Justice for Myanmar released a press statement regarding the international activities of Adani Ports & SEZ. They accused Adani of building a container port in Yangon, Myanmar on land leased from the Myanmar Economic Corporation (MEC), a military-run business conglomerate, which was directly contributing financially to the Myanmar Junta after the 2021 coup. The Australian Broadcasting Corporation corroborated the reporting of Justice for Myanmar including video evidence. MEC and its subsidiaries are sanctioned by US, UK and EU. On 7 March 2022, the Government Pension Fund of Norway placed the company under observation due to "unacceptable risk that the company contributes to or is responsible for serious violations of individuals’ rights in situations of war or conflict". In October 2021, APSEZ announced that they would be "exiting the company's investment in Myanmar" after a risk management committee's review.

=== CWC land grabbing ===
The Supreme Court of India overturned an order given by the Gujarat High Court that allowed Adani Ports SEZ to reportedly take over 34 acres of land owned by Central Warehousing Corporation adjacent to the latter's Mundra Port. The highest court in India issued a rebuke to Gujarat High Court for "adopting dual standards" when making its decision in favour of a business group.

=== Allegations of stock manipulation ===
In January 2023, Hindenburg Research published the findings of a two-year investigation claiming that Adani had engaged in market manipulation and accounting malpractices. Hindenburg also disclosed that it was holding short positions on Adani Group companies. Bonds and shares of companies associated with Adani experienced a decline in value after the accusations. Adani denied the fraud allegations as 'unfounded and ill intentioned'.

=== Auditor's concerns ===
In May 2023, the company's auditor, Deloitte, issued a qualified opinion on the company's financial reports, as it could not verify whether certain transactions were with unrelated or related parties. In August 2023, Deloitte resigned as the company's auditor citing its inability to scrutinize the company's transactions with other group companies of which it was not a statutory auditor.

== See also ==
- List of ports in India
