= Supreme Industries =

Indian plastics manufacturing company

Supreme Industries Limited

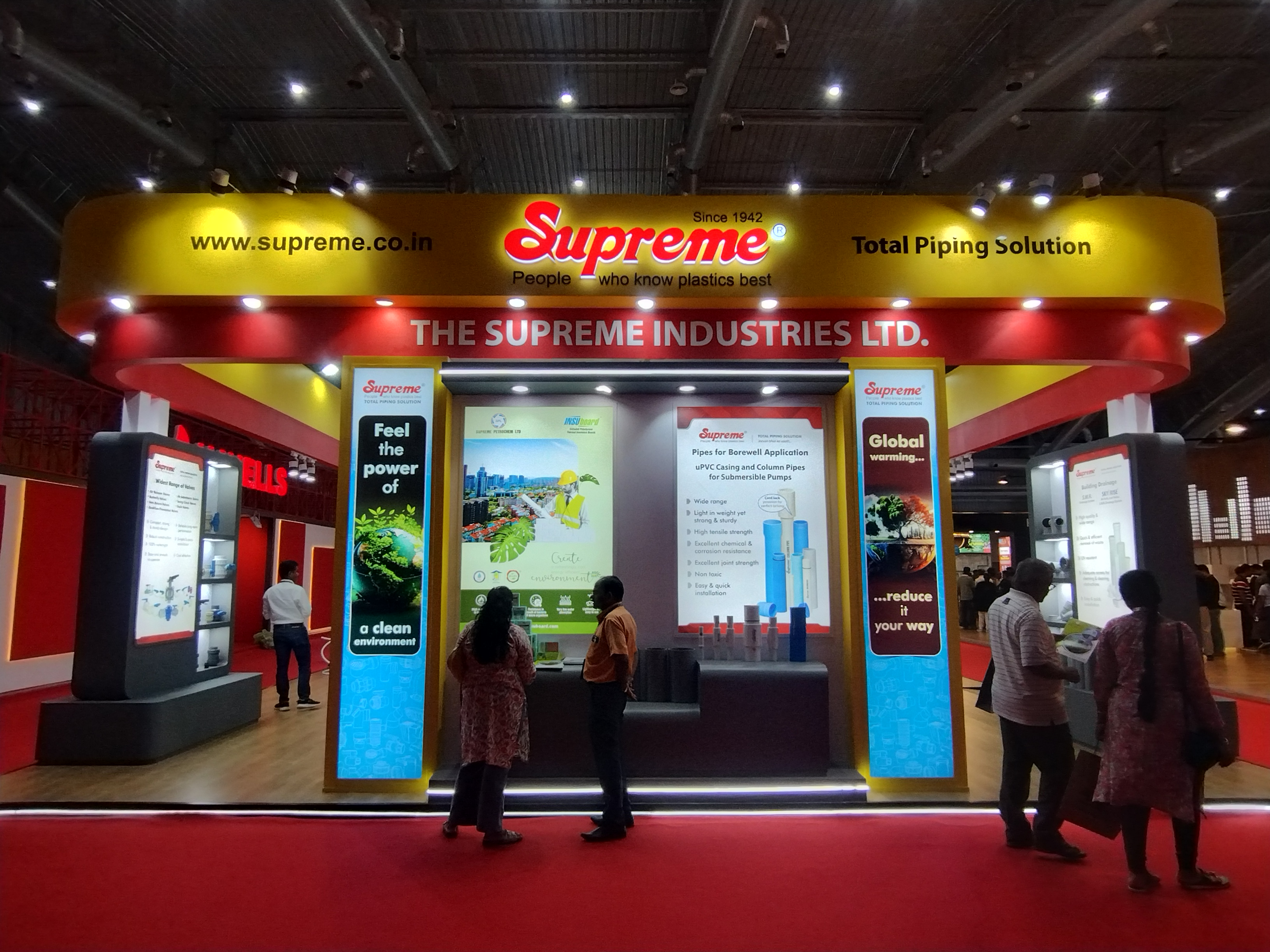
- Supreme Industries at Acetech 2025, BIEC
- Company type: Public
- Traded as: BSE: 509930; NSE: SUPREMEIND
- Industry: Plastic processing
- Founded: 1942
- Headquarters: Mumbai, Maharashtra, India
- Key people: M. P. Taparia, Chairman
- Products: Polystyrene & polymer
- Revenue: ▲₹9,201 crore (US$960 million) (FY23)
- Operating income: ▼₹1,199 crore (US$130 million) (FY23)
- Net income: ▼₹865 crore (US$90 million) (FY23)
- Number of employees: 15,000
- Subsidiaries: Supreme Petrochem
- Website: www.supreme.co.in

Supreme Industries Limited is an Indian plastics company, based in Mumbai. The company manufactures industrial and engineering molded furniture products, storage and material handling crates, multi-layer sheets, multi-layer films, packaging films, expanded polyethylene foam, PVC pipes and fittings, molded furniture, sataranj mats, disposable EPS containers.
