= Rajpuri, Raigad =

Village in Maharashtra

Rajpuri
- village
- Interactive map of Rajpuri
- Country: India
- State: Maharashtra
- District: Raigad
- Taluka: Murud

Government
  - Type: Grampanchayat

Languages
  - Official: Marathi
- Time zone: UTC+5:30 (IST)
- Nearest city: Murud

Rajpuri is a village situated at a distance of 4 km from Murud city, in the Raigad district of India. The village is situated on the inlet of Arabian Sea.

== Population ==
The village population is above 4,000 people.

== Education ==
The village operates three Schools.

== Transport ==
There are many ways of getting there:

- Air: The nearest airport is Mumbai.
- Rail: Nearest railroad is Roha, 122 km.
- Sea: There are regular ferry services available from Ferry Warf up to Rewas (23 km) starting at 6 a.m. through 6 p.m. The service is suspended during the monsoons. After Rewas, one needs to take the road transport. There are also regular catamarans from Gateway of India, operated up to Mandwa. The Murud-Janjira Fort can be reached from Rajpuri Jetty.
- Road: Murud is 165 km and about 5 hours' driving distance from Mumbai. One can travel up to Panvel and then take the road that passes through the Karnala Bird Sanctuary up to Pen. One can travel further to Alibaug or Roha.
