= Magod Falls =

Waterfalls near Sirsi, Karnataka

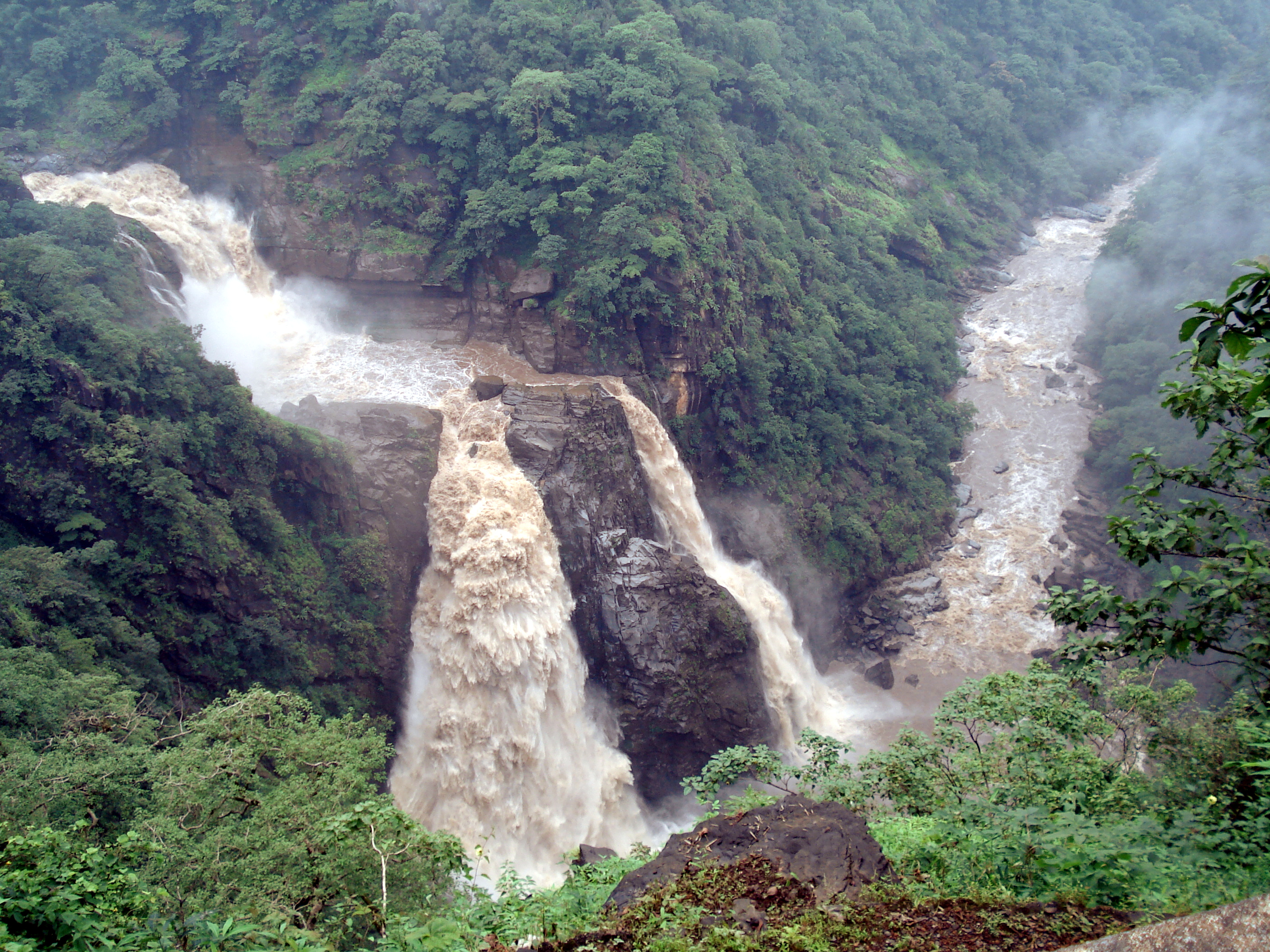
Magod Falls

Magod Falls is a group of waterfalls in Karnataka, India, where the river Bedti falls from a height of nearly 200 metres (660 ft) in two steps.

The falls are located about 16 km (9.9 mi) from the town of Yellapur and 58 km (36 mi) from Sirsi, in the district of Uttara Kannada, and are easily accessible from several lakes and towns.

== See also ==
- List of waterfalls
- List of waterfalls in India
- List of waterfalls in India by height
