= Andhra Pradesh Maritime Board =

Andhra Pradesh Maritime Board governs and monitors ports in Andhra Pradesh and ensures their development, while maintaining the confidence of stakeholders. It is an autonomous body set up as per Andhra Pradesh Port Policy 2015. The board's head office is located in Vishakapatnam. The chairman is nominated by the State Government.

== History ==
Andhra Pradesh Maritime Board was set up in 2019 as an autonomous body.

== Objectives ==
Andhra Pradesh Maritime Board was set up with following objectives:

- Development of ports in the state and projects related to ship building.
- Improvements in connectivity with hinterlands.
- Industrialisation of cities connected to ports.

== Administration ==
Andhra Pradesh Maritime Board has headquarters in Vishakapatnam. The chair is nominated by the Andhra Pradesh Government.

== Chair and members ==
Andhra Pradesh Maritime Board has a Chair who is nominated by the State Government. The Vice Chairman will be Principal Secretary in Industries and Ports. Members of the board include Secretaries of Fisheries and Finance and members appointed from private ports, Central Government's shipping ministry, representative from Central Board of Excise and Customs and any other Government-nominated secretary. The secretary is designated as Chief Executive officer and consists of four special invitees to be representatives from the head of coastal police and members from Indian Coast Guard, Indian Navy and Industry Associations.

== See also ==
- Maharashtra Maritime Board
