= Port operator =

Organization that administers port traffic

A port operator is a port authority or company that contracts with the port authority to move cargo through a port at a contracted minimum level of productivity. They may be state-owned (particularly for port authorities) or privately run.

The work involves managing the movement of cargo containers between cargo ships, trucks and freight trains and optimizing the flow of goods through customs to minimize the amount of time a ship spends in port. Maintaining efficiency involves managing and upgrading gantry cranes, berths, waterways, roads, storage facilities, communication equipment, computer systems and dockworkers' union contracts. The port operator also manages paperwork, leases, safety and port security.

== Largest port operators ==
This is a list of the world's largest port operators.

Port Operator	Country
Adani Ports & SEZ	India
AP Møller Terminals	Netherlands
China Merchants Port Holdings Company Limited	China
COSCO Shipping Ports	China
DP World	United Arab Emirates
Evergreen Marine Corporation	Taiwan
Eurogate Container Terminal	Germany
Hamburger Hafen und Logistik Aktiengesellschaft	Germany
Hutchison Port Holdings	Hong Kong
International Container Terminal Services	Philippines
PSA International	Singapore
Shanghai International Port Group	China
SSA Marine	United States
Terminal Investment Limited	Switzerland
