= Gangavaram, Visakhapatnam =

Gangavaram
- Neighborhood
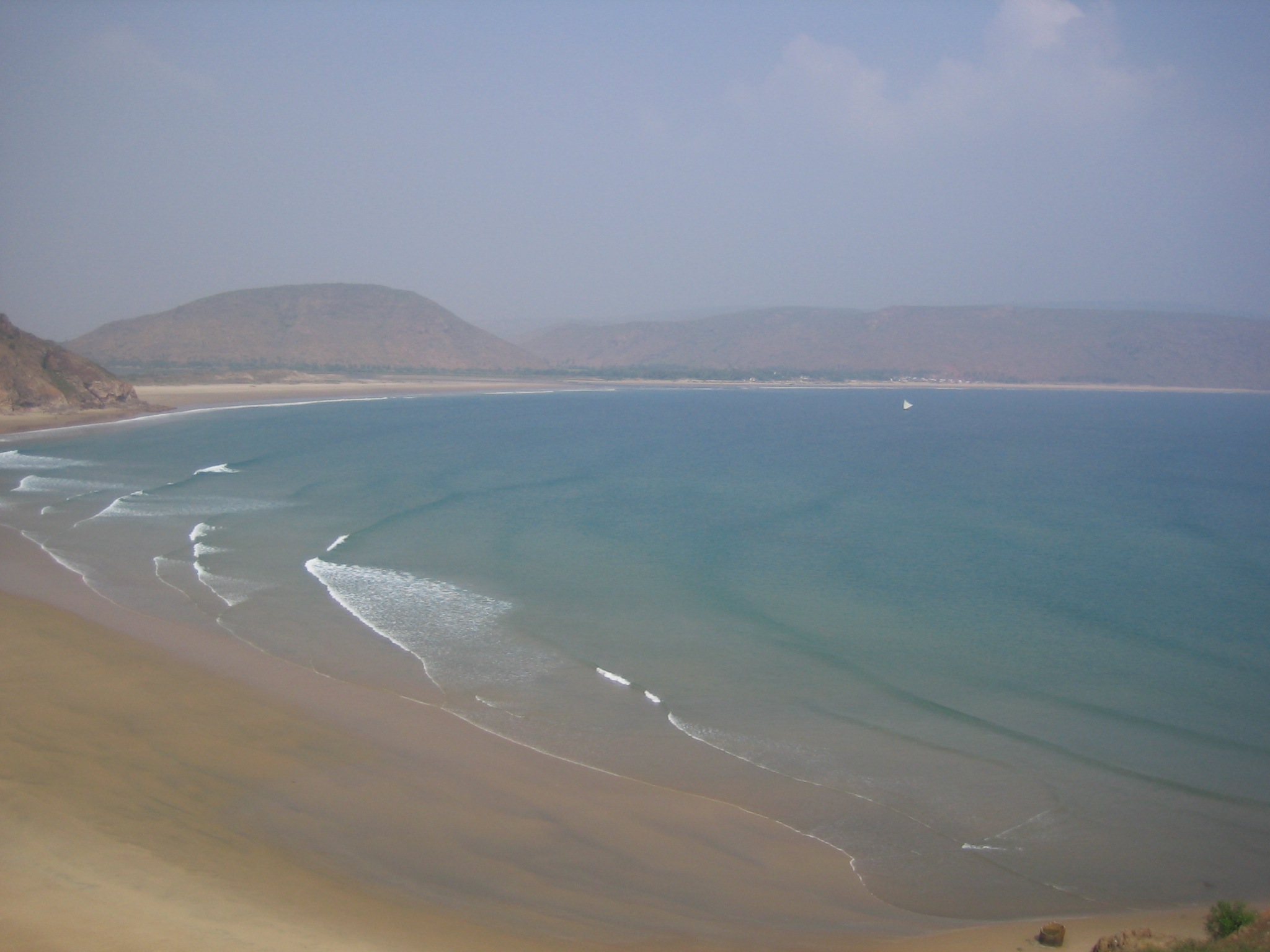
- Gangavaram beach

- Location in Visakhapatnam
- Coordinates: 17.644085°N 83.228577°E
- Country: India
- State: Andhra Pradesh
- District: Visakhapatnam

Government
  - Body: Greater Visakhapatnam Municipal Corporation

Languages
  - Official: Telugu
- Time zone: UTC+5:30 (IST)
- Nearest city: Visakhapatnam

Gangavaram is a suburban area in Visakhapatnam.

== Geography ==
Gangavaram is located at 17°37′43″N 83°14′10″E. This village comes under the Greater Visakhapatnam Corporation in Andhra Pradesh, India.

== Beach ==
The beach in Gangavaram is called Gangavaram Beach. It was named after the town which existed before the Visakhapatnam Steel Plant was constructed.

== Transport ==
APSRTC routes

Route number	Start	End	Via
63	Gangavaram Port	RK Beach	Pedagantyada, New Gajuwaka, Malkapuram, Scindia, Convent, Town Kotharoad, Jagadamba Centre
65F	Gangavaram Port	Fishing Harbour	Pedagantyada, New Gajuwaka, Malkapuram, Scindia, Convent, Town Kotharoad, Jagadamba Centre, Collectorate

== Festivals ==
All of the Hindu festivals are celebrated in the village. The Maaghapournami is celebrated in February through March, the people from surrounding villages bathe in the sea. There is even a small fair on this day. The Paidithalamma Ammavaari Panduga festival is celebrated every other year in mid-June.

== Village demolished ==
Gangavaram village still exists but Dibbapalem Village was removed from the area and all the families are shifted to two places. Most of the people working at Visakhapatnam Steel plant are shifter near Srinagar and the people who have their living from fishing are located near Peda Gantyada. During this, there was a lot of tension which went on for several months leading to strikes and police firing. While 1,270 families accepted the compensation package and agreed to vacate their houses, 350 owing allegiance to the Vedika refused to leave the village, demanding categorical assurance from the management of the private port to provide permanent jobs to at least one member of the project-affected family.

== Gangavaram Port ==
The whole village was vacated and construction of the port began in December 2005, and commercial operations commenced in August 2008. The port was formally inaugurated in July 2009, by the then Chief Minister of Andhra Pradesh, Y S Rajasekhara Reddy. The port is called Gangavaram Port which was named after the beach. Fishermen in the villages of Gangavaram and Dibbapalem, who were directly affected by the construction of the port, demanded construction of an alternative jetty and a relief and rehabilitation package.
