= Chondhi, Alibag =

Village in Maharashtra, India

Chondhi
- Village
- Location within Maharashtra
- Coordinates: 18.7270°N 72.8811°E
- Country: India
- State: Maharashtra
- District: Raigad
- Taluka: Alibag

Languages
  - Official: Marathi
- Time zone: UTC+5:30 (IST)
- PIN CODE: 402 201
- Telephone code: 02141

Chondhi is a small village in the Alibag subdistrict of the Raigad district in Maharashtra, India. It is located to the north of Alibag on Alibag-Rewas Road. Chondhi acts as a major market area for the neighboring villages. Nearby attractions include Kihim Beach and Kankeshwar. The language spoken here is Marathi.

== Economy ==
Retail business is the mainstay of Chondhi. Several departmental stores and pharmacies are located here. Chondhi is also popular among the locals for its fish and vegetable market.

== Administration ==
Chondhi forms part of the Group Gram Panchayat in Kihim.

== Transport ==
- Road: Chondhi is well connected to Alibag (approximately 9 km) by road. MSRTC buses running on the Alibag - Rewas route are available throughout the day. Buses running on Alibag-Kihim and Alibag-Saswane also pass through Chondhi, but the frequency is less as compared to Alibag-Rewas route buses. Auto Rickshaws are readily available everywhere for local travel, but the fares are not regulated. It is a common practice to decide the fare beforehand to avoid bargaining later. One has to travel through Chondhi to reach Kihim Beach.
- Railways: The nearest railway station is at Pen, which is approximately 30 km away.
- Ferry: Passenger boat services are available from Mandwa Jetty to Gateway of India and from Rewas to Bhaucha Dhakka in Mumbai throughout the year, except for Monsoon.
