= Gangavaram Port =

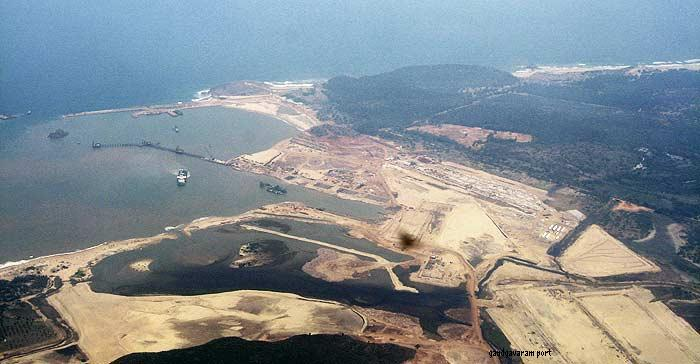
- Interactive map of Gangavaram Port

Location
- Country: India
- Location: Gangavaram, Visakhapatnam
- Coordinates: 17.6215°N 83.2298°E

Details
- Opened: July 2009
- Operated by: Gangavaram Port Ltd.
- Owned by: Adani Ports & SEZ (89.6%)
- Size: 2,800 acres (11 km^{2})
- No. of berths: 9
- Draft depth: 18 metres (59 ft) (Maximum)

Statistics
- Annual cargo tonnage: 64 million tonnes(2021-22)
- Website www.Gangavaram.com

Gangavaram Port is a port located in Visakhapatnam, Andhra Pradesh. Inaugurated in July 2009, it has a depth of 21m. It is managed by Gangavaram Port Ltd., a special-purpose company floated by Mr. DVS Raju and cousin Mr.Datla Sreenu. Mr. DVS Raju serves as its chairman and managing director. The company is owned by the DVS Raju Group (58.1%), Adani Ports (31.5%) and the Andhra Pradesh Government (10.4%).

== History ==
Construction of the port began in December 2005, and commercial operations commenced in August 2008. The port was formally inaugurated on 12 July 2009, by the Andhra Pradesh Chief Minister Y S Rajasekhara Reddy.

The port is located where Borramma Gedda river joins the sea. Fishermen in the Gangavaram and Dibbapalem villages, who were directly affected by the construction of the port, demanded construction of an alternative jetty at Yarada and a relief and rehabilitation package.

The DVS Raju group invested Rs. 18.50 billion in the development of the port. Gangavaram Port Ltd. has taken a loan of Rs. 11.70 billion from a consortium of 13 banks, including the State Bank of India, to fund the Phase I development.

Adani Ports announced on 3 March 2021 that it had acquired a 31.5% stake in Gangavaram Port from Windy Lakeside Investment, an affiliate of Warburg Pincus, for ₹1,954 crore (US$200 million).

Adani Ports has acquired 58.1% stake in Gangavaram Port from DVS Raju Group, for ₹3,604 crore (US$370 million) in 2022, bringing 100% ownership to Adani Ports.

== Comparisons with the Vizag port ==
The first client of the Gangavaram Port Ltd. is the Rashtriya Ispat Nigam Ltd., which runs the Vizag Steel Plant, and earlier used the Visakhapatnam Port. The Gangavaram Port Ltd. plans to build conveyors for taking imported raw materials directly to the Vizag Steel plant, in order to reduce the railway transportation costs.

The Union Government of India, which owns the Visakhapatnam port, had proposed a joint venture between the Visakhapatnam port and the private operator of the Gangavaram port to make sure that the Visakhapatnam port's business remains unaffected. However, this proposal was rejected by the then Andhra Pradesh Chief Minister, N. Chandrababu Naidu.

DVS Raju, while talking to reporters during the port's inauguration ceremony, insisted that it would be "complementary in nature" to the Visakhapatnam port, and not a competitor.

The Gangavaram port is capable of handling Super Cape size vessels of up to 200,000 DWT. The State Government plans to construct a Rs. 21-crore four-lane flyover to the Gangavaram port.

== Cargo handled ==
The Gangavaram port handled 20.74 million tonnes of cargo during 2014-15 as against 15.81 million tonnes during the previous financial year.
