= New Mangalore Port =

Seaport in Karnataka, India

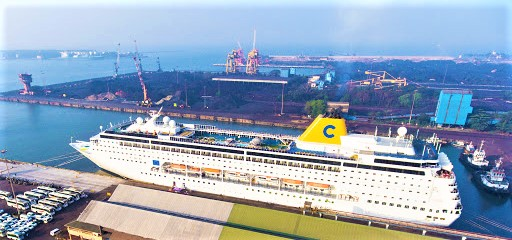
- Interactive map of New Mangalore Port

Location
- Country: India
- Location: Mangalore
- Coordinates: 12°57′17″N 74°48′17″E

Details
- Opened: 4 May 1974
- Operated by: New Mangalore Port Authority
- Owned by: Ministry of Ports, Shipping and Waterways, Government of India
- No. of berths: 17
- Chairman: Venkata Ramana Akkaraju

Statistics
- Annual container volume: 62,808 TEU (2014–2015)
- Value of cargo: 36.5 million tonnes (2014–2015)
- Website; New Mangalore Port

New Mangalore Port or New Mangalore Port Authority (NMPA) is an all-weather port at Panambur, Mangalore in Karnataka state in India. The total land area of the port is approximately 480 hectares (1,200 acres). The New Mangalore Port is the deepest inner harbour on the west coast. It is the only major port of Karnataka and the seventh largest port in India. It is operated by New Mangalore Port Authority (NMPA).

== Naming ==
The name "New Mangalore Port" distinguishes it from an old harbour or port in Mangalore city which is called "Mangalore bunder" or "Old bunder". The old harbour is south of New Mangalore port and is now used for fishing and for ferrying small goods.

== Location ==
The port is in Panambur, Mangalore on the west coast of India. It is north of the confluence of Gurupura (Phalguni) river to Arabian sea. It is 170 nautical miles (310 km) south of Mormugao Port and 191 nautical miles (354 km) north of Kochi Port.

== History ==
The Mangalore Harbour Project was set up in the year 1962. The maritime works on the project commenced in 1968. The New Mangalore Port, the only major port of Karnataka was declared as the ninth major port on 4 May 1974 and was formally inaugurated by the then Prime Minister of India, Indira Gandhi on 11 January 1975. The provisions of the Major Port Trust Act 1963 were applied to NMPT with effect from 1 April 1980. Since then, the Port has been functioning as a centre of activities for Importers and Exporters of this region. The land evacuees who donated land to seaport at Panambur were rehabilitated at Katipalla mostly on land belonging to Krishnapura Matha near Surathkal.

== Transport links ==
The national highway NH-66 (earlier NH-17) passes the port. The nearest railway station is Thokur, but passengers have to alight at Surathkal railway station which is on Konkan railway route, approximately 6 kilometres (3.7 mi) from the New Mangalore port. The nearest airport is Mangaluru International airport, which is just few kilometres from the NMPT at Panambur.

== Types of cargo ==
The Port serves the hinterland of Karnataka and to some extent state of Kerala. The major commodities exported through the port are iron ore concentrates and pellets, iron ore fines, manganese, granite stones, coffee, cashew, and containerized cargo. New Mangalore port (NMPT) achieved a milestone on 30 June 2023 by handling highest parcel traffic of 2689 twenty-foot equivalent units (TEU), consisting of 1210 import TEUs and 1479 export TEUs.

The major imports of the port are crude and petroleum products, LPG, wood pulp, timber logs, finished fertilizers, liquid ammonia, sand, phosphoric acid, other liquid chemicals, and containerized cargo.

New Mangalore Port offers berth for cruise vessels. International tourists alight here and travel the coastal (Karavali) region of Karnataka state. It offers a helicopter facility for the tourists coming by cruise ships.

== Awards ==
NMPA received the Greentech Environment Award 2014.
