= Angré Port =

- Interactive map of Angré Port

Location
- Country: India
- Location: Jaigad, Maharashtra, India
- Coordinates: 17.2867087°N 73.2284082°E

Details
- Opened: 2012
- Operated by: Angré Port Pvt Ltd
- Owned by: Chowgule Group
- Type of harbour: cargo based sea port

Statistics
- Annual container volume: 4 million tonnes (2023-2024)
- Website www.angreport.com

Angré Port is an all-weather port located in Jaigad, Maharasthra on the coast of Konkan. The port has cargo facility as well as industrial park attached to it.The port has 300 acres of industrial land for warehouse and logistics.

== Details ==
The port is owned by Chowgule group and the port is strategically located at mouth of Jaigad River

== Capacity ==
The port is able to handle 2,41,000 MT of cargo and 32,000 Kilo-Litre of liquid cargo.
