= Ports in Karnataka =

Karnataka's coastline, known as Karavali, stretches 300 km between Mangalore in the Dakshina Kannada district and Karwar in the Uttara Kannada district. This coastline runs along the western shore of the Arabian Sea. Karnataka has one major and ten minor ports in this coastal belt. Important rivers in this area, including the Kali, Belekeri, Gangavali, Aghanashini Sharavathi, Sharabi, Kollur, Gangolli, Sitanadi, Gurpur, and Netravati, flow into the Arabian Sea. Sea erosion, the migration of river mouths, and siltation of ports and harbours are some of the common problems facing this region.

The development of ports is a state subject, and the Government of Karnataka established the Department of Ports and Inland Water Transport in 1957. The department manages one major port and ten minor ports between Mangalore in the south and Karwar in the north. The only major port is the New Mangalore Port. The minor ports are located at Karwar, Old Mangalore, Belekeri, Tadadi, Honnavar, Bhatkal, Kundapur, Hangarakatta, Malpe, and Padubidri. Of these, Karwar is the only all-weather port, while the others are riverine fair-weather lighterage ports.

In light of the economic reforms implemented by the central government in the early 1990s, the Karnataka government has also been making serious efforts to improve its port infrastructure. In 1997, a "Port Policy" was formulated to develop all ports with private participation. The policy is based on the BOOST (Build-Own-Operate-Share and Transfer) concept and primarily aims to improve cargo handling capacity.

== Maritime Board ==
The Karnataka Maritime Board was established on 23 August 2017 as a statutory body by the Government of Karnataka to provide for the rapid development and management of Ports, Inland Waterways, Islands and the coastal region in the state.

== New Mangalore Port ==
New Mangalore Port is a deep-water, all-weather port located at Panambur, Mangalore. It is the only major port in Karnataka and is currently the seventh largest port in India.^{[3]}

== Old Mangalore Port ==
Old Mangalore Port is located south of New Mangalore Port and is popularly known by the name Bunder. The port was once used to ferry goods and passengers to Lakshadweep Island and Middle Eastern countries. Now, fishing has become the main activity at this harbour.

== Karwar Port ==
Karwar Port is acclaimed as one of the best natural all-weather ports on the West Coast. It is located in the Uttara Kannada district on the southern side of the Kali River and caters to the trading needs of northern Karnataka, Andhra Pradesh, and Maharashtra. The port is situated beside National Highway 66 (NH66), which connects Mumbai and Kochi, making it one of the country's busiest corridors. Additionally, it is only 8 km away from the Konkan Railway network.

Recently, the High Court of Karnataka directed the state government to stop all developmental activities being undertaken at Karwar Port under the Sagarmala project.

== Belekeri port ==
Belekeri Port is located at Binge Bay, south of the Kali estuary and 27 km south of Karwar in the Uttara Kannada district of Karnataka. It is currently one of the second largest port in Karnataka after the Mangalore Port. One of its main advantages is its proximity to Hospet and Bellary, which are major producers of an iron ore. This port is primarily used for exporting iron ore. Vessels do not come to shore or berth; instead, ore is transported to ships at sea through barges. Currently, there are three jetties available for barge loading, but the port is not well dredged, and some private companies are operating there.

== Tadadi port ==
Tadadi Port, is situated at the estuary of the Aghanashini River. The backwaters of the Aghanashini River create a vast waterfront at this port, providing an opportunity for development with modern infrastructures. The Konkan railway line and NH 17 pass close to the port area. Additionally, NH 63, the proposed Hubli-Ankola railway line, and Honnavar-Tumkur NH 206 contribute to the overall development of Tadadi Port. This port is projected for development under the BOOST (Build, Own, Operate, Share, and Transfer) concept through private participation. A vast area is available for the port's development with negligible rehabilitation issues. Tadadi Port has an effective hinterland of about 200,000 square meters, encompassing central and northern parts of Karnataka and some areas of Andhra Pradesh, which are rich in minerals, forests, agriculture, and marine resources.

== Hangarakatte port ==
Hangarakatte Port is located in the Udupi district of Karnataka. It is primarily used by fishing boats and is situated on the banks of the Swarna River and the Sita River.

== Honnavar port ==
Honnavar Port is located where the Sharavati River meets the Arabian Sea, near the town of Honnavar in the Uttara Kannada district. Efforts to develop this port for handling larger ships have not been successful. National Highway 17 and the Honnavar railway station on the Konkan Railway route are nearby.

== Bhatkal port ==
Bhatkal Port is a well-protected port located on the bank of the Sharabhi River. During the Vijayanagar Empire, this port was used for trade with the Arabs. Currently, fishing vessels utilize the facilities of this port. Bhatkal Port has the potential to be developed into a modern fishing harbor with full-fledged fish handling facilities. The port is surrounded by hills and the river.

== Kundapura (Gangolli) port ==
Kundapura (Gangolli) Port is located at the confluence of the Pancha Gangolli River, near the town of Gangolli in the Kundapura region of Udupi district. Although National Highway 17 and the Konkan Railway pass nearby, the development of this port has not yet occurred. It is primarily used for fishing.

== Hangarakatta port ==
Hangarakatta Port is located in the Udupi district of Karnataka. It is primarily used by fishing boats and is situated on the banks of the Swarna River and the Sita River.

== Malpe port ==
Malpe Port is situated near the town of Udupi. It is located at the confluence of the Udyavara River and the Arabian Sea. The port primarily handles fishing activities but also occasionally accommodates cargo.

== Padubidri port ==
Padubidri Port is located in the Udupi district of Karnataka. There are discussions about developing Padubidri Port to handle coal required for the thermal power generating station being set up in the nearby village of Nandikur.

== Inland water transport ==
There is no major inland route for water transport in Karnataka.
