= Veshvi =

Village in Maharashtra

Coordinates: 18°39′N 72°54′E

Veshvi is a small village in Raigad District, Maharashtra state in Western India. The 2011 Census of India recorded a total of 1,655 residents in the village. Veshvi's geographical area is 518 hectares (1,280 acres).
