= Magod =

Magod or Māgodu is a small village in the Valsad district of the South Gujarat region of West India.

This village is approximately 160 km from Mumbai and 100 km from Surat. Distance from Valsad railway station is 11 km and its approximately 7 km from National High way no 48 Atul. Big chemical complex Atul is less than 6 km from magod

== Agriculture ==
There are many farms in Magod which are owned by multiple families. Its main source of income is yielded from the production of mangoes. Other subordinate products of income are rice, various vegetables, including tomatoes.

== Education ==
=== Schools ===
==== Affiliated with the ICSE ====
- Jay Ambe International School

==== Affiliated with the CBSE ====
- Vedaant Multipurpose School
