= Bhankodar =

Village in Gujarat state, India

Bhankodar is a village in the Jafrabad taluka of the Amreli district in Gujarat, India. It is situated about eight miles east of Jafrabad, and about a mile from the sea-shore.

== History ==
During the British period (around 1831), it was a separate tribute-paying taluka. Later it fell under the jurisdiction of the Junagadh State.

== Port ==
Bhankodar Port or Swan LNG Terminal is a LNG terminal located near the Bhankodar village. It's owned by Swan Energy (since rebranded to Swan Corp), an Indian multinational conglomerate.
