= Supreme Petrochem =

Supreme Petrochemicals
- Type: Public company
- Traded as: BSE: 500405; NSE: SUPPETRO
- Industry: Petrochemicals
- Founded: 1995
- Headquarters: Mumbai, Maharashtra, India
- Key people: M. P. Taparia, Chairman
- Products: Polystyrene Expandable Polystyrene, styrene & polymer
- Revenue: ₹16,154.2 million (US$170 million) (2009–2010)
- Owner: Rajan Raheja Group; Supreme Industries Limited
- Number of employees: 350–400
- Parent: Supreme Industries
- Website: www.supremepetrochem.com

Supreme Petrochem Ltd (SPL) (BSE: 500405:NSE: SUPPETRO) is India's largest producer and exporter of polystyrene polymer based in Mumbai, Maharashtra, India. In Indian market it has a share of more than 50%. SPL is also the largest exporter of PS from India, exporting to over 93 countries around the globe.
