= Chondhi, Yavatmal =

Village in Maharashtra, India

Chondhi
- Village
- Location within Maharashtra
- Coordinates: 20.027629°N 77.536677°E
- Country: India
- State: Maharashtra
- District: Yavatmal
- Taluka: Pusad

Population
  - Total: 7,865

Languages
  - Official: Marathi
- Time zone: UTC+5:30 (IST)
- PIN CODE: 445 204
- Telephone code: 07233

Chondhi is a village located 15 km from Pusad, on the Nagpur-Road. Chondhi acts as a major market area for the neighbouring villages. and Most of the population is of the Andh tribe.

== Administration ==
Chondhi Village run by the Gram Panchayat Chondhi in Pusad Taluka. under Yavatmal district Maharashtra.

== Transportation ==
- Chondhi is connected to Pusad by road. MSRTC buses running on the Pusad - Akola route Through Gahuli are available throughout the day. Buses running on Pusad-Gahuli and Pusad - Paradh also pass through Chondhi, Auto Rickshaws are readily available everywhere for local travel,
- The nearest railway station is at Washim which is approximately 63 km away. other one is Dhamangown railway junction and which is approximately 150 km away. and there is after Mumbai railway station Maharashtra's Second largest railway station at Nagpur, which is approximately 249 km away from Chondhi.

== Economy ==
Agriculture business is the mainstay of Chondhi. It is known for its milk and vegetable market. Few average quality milk collection centre are located in Chondhi. The village contains several hospitals and schools.
