= Dighi Port =

Sea port in Maharashtra, India

- Interactive map of Dighi Port
- Location within Maharashtra

Location
- Country: India
- Location: Dighi, Raigad, Maharashtra
- Coordinates: 18.2751329°N 72.968366°E

Details
- Opened: 2014(construction started); 2018(operations started)
- Operated by: Adani Ports and Special Economic Zone Limited
- Owned by: IL & FS (2014-2018); JNPT (2018-21); Adani Ports & SEZ (2021-present)
- Type of Harbor: Deep-sea port
- No. of berths: 5

Dighi Port is a sea port in Maharashtra, India, on the eastern coast of the Arabian Sea, 42 nautical miles (78 km; 48 mi) from the Mumbai port. The port is operated by Adani Ports & SEZ. The main road that links Dighi Port to the Indian highway network is NH 753F.

== History ==
In 2014, IL&FS Engineering and Construction Company bagged a contract worth Rs 179.84 crore for development of multipurpose berths at the Dighi Port. The port was to be developed as a multi-purpose, multi-cargo and all-weather port under a 50-year concession agreement with the Maharashtra Maritime Board (MMB) on a build, own, operate, share, transfer basis and had a land bank of 1,600 acres. However, because of poor hinterland connectivity, the port had only started partial operations as of 2018.

In April 2018, Dighi Port Ltd. was taken to bankruptcy court by an operational creditor. It also owed Rs1,600 crore to a consortium of banks. Dighi Port Ltd owed ₹30 crore to DBM Geotechnics to construct multi-purpose berths 1 and 2 at Dighi and berth No 3. It marks the first instance of a port being hauled to the NCLT. As part of the bankruptcy resolution process, the Jawaharlal Nehru Port Trust (JNPT), Adani Ports, DP World and JSW Infrastructure, among others, submitted expressions of interest (EoIs) to acquire Dighi Port Limited. Adani Ports and Special Economic Zone Limited (Adani Ports & SEZ) completed the acquisition of Dighi Port Limited on 15 February 2021 for Rs 705 crore. Dighi Port is undergoing massive expansion, almost three times its current size.

== Dighi Port Industrial Area ==
The Dighi Port Industrial Area (DPIA) project, spread over 5,024 hectares in Raigad district. The ₹7360.46-crore DPIA project is expected to be developed alongside the port expansion, and will be a major node of the proposed Delhi-Mumbai Industrial Corridor (DMIC).The DPIA site is strategically located adjacent to the Mumbai-Goa National Highway, the Pune-Kolad Highway, and the Pune-Harihareshwar Highway. It is about 117 km from Mumbai, and 26 km east of Dighi Port. The industrial complex is likely to cater to engineering, food processing, and pharmaceutical industries.
