= Karanja, Raigad =

Karanja Uran Island Caranja
- city
- Location in Maharashtra, India
- Coordinates: 18.51°N 73.2°E
- Country: India
- State: Maharashtra
- District: Raigad

Languages
  - Official: Marathi
- Time zone: UTC+5:30 (IST)

Karanja or Uran Island is a town in Uran, Navi Mumbai in the Raigad district of Maharashtra, India, about eight miles (13 km) long and four miles (6.4 km) broad. It lies in the south-east of Mumbai Harbour, about six miles (9.7 km) miles south-east of the Carnac pier in Mumbai (Bombay).
