= Agardanda =

Village in Maharashtra

- Village
- Location in Maharashtra, India
- Coordinates: 18.2793111°N 72.9898068°E
- Country: India
- State: Maharashtra
- District: Raigad
- Sub-District: Murud
- Elevation: 11 m (36 ft)

Population (2011)
  - Total: 661

Languages
  - Official: Marathi
  - Other: Hindi
- Time zone: UTC+5:30 (IST)
- PIN: 402401
- Telephone code: 02144
- Nearest city: Murud

Agardanda is a village in Murud Janjira Taluka, Raigad district, Maharashtra, India. Located 9 kilometers south of Murud, Agardanda is getting prominence because of the ongoing construction of Agardanda shipyard and terminal, which is just across the narrow creek. It is also an important transit hub to get across to Dighi, through ferries plying throughout the day at regular intervals.

== Dighi port ==
Dighi port is Located in Raigad district, the port is on the banks of the Rajpuri Creek on the west coast of India.It was acquired by Adani port and Special Economic Zone in Feb 2021 from the Balaji Group, Which had been granted a 50-years permit by the Maharashtra Maritime Board (MMB) to operate and develop the port. Dighi port is soon to be a major gateway of Maharashtra. It supplies oil, container and bulk cargos.

== Beach ==
It has a beach presenting a panoramic view of the Janjira fort. Surrounded on three sides by the sea, Agardanda is a tranquil place covered in coconut and betel nut trees.
