= Shahapur (Thane) =

- City
- Location in Maharashtra, India
- Coordinates: 19.45°N 73.33°E
- Country: India
- State: Maharashtra
- District: Thane

Government
  - Type: Municipal Council
  - Body: Shahapur Municipal Council
- Elevation: 46 m (151 ft)
- Demonym: Shahapurkar

Languages
  - Official: Marathi
- Time zone: UTC+5:30 (IST)
- Postal code: 421601
- ISO 3166 code: IN-MH
- Vehicle registration: MH-04

Shahapur is a town and census town in Thane district, Maharashtra, India. It is a part of the Mumbai Metropolitan Region (MMR) and is governed by the Shahapur Municipal Council. Shahapur is known for its water reservoirs, historical significance, and proximity to the Western Ghats, making it an important residential and tourist destination.

== Geography ==
Shahapur is located at 19.45°N 73.33°E. It has an average elevation of 46 metres (151 feet).

Shahapur is also a major supplier of water to Mumbai.
