= Dharamtar Port =

Sea port in Maharashtra, India

JSW Dharamtar Port
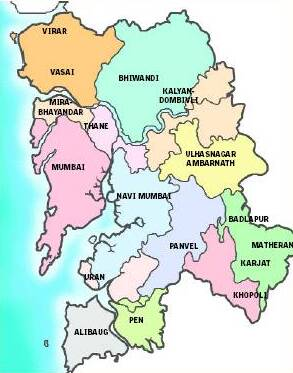
- Dharamtar is a part of Mumbai Metropolitan Region
- Interactive map of JSW Dharamtar Port
- Location in India Maharashtra

Location
- Country: India
- Location: Dharamtar, Raigad, Maharashtra
- Coordinates: 18.7053°N 73.0282°E

Details
- Opened: 2012; 14 years ago
- Operated by: JSW Dharamtar Port Private Limited
- Owned by: JSW Infrastructure
- Type of harbour: Deep-sea port
- No. of berths: 5
- Main trades: Steel, Iron ore and Coal

Statistics
- Annual cargo tonnage: 34 million tonnes (2021)
- Draft: 18.5 metres (61 ft)

Dharamtar Port, commonly known as JSW Dharamtar Port is a port located on the right bank of the Amba river 10 miles (16 km) from its mouth.

== Services ==
JSW started the construction of the port in 2009, JSW Group began operating the Dharamtar Port in 2012. JSW Dharamtar Port Ltd (JSWDPL) is a special purpose vehicle created under the aegis of JSW Infrastructure Ltd to handle the cargo of the JSW Steel, Dolvi works. JSW Dharamtar Port Private Limited was incorporated on 24 September 2012.
