= Rewas Port =

Port in Rewas Creek, India

Rewas Port (Rewas-Bodani or Revas) is one of 48 “minor” ports of Maharashtra located at Rewas Creek, near Karanja creek at the mouth of the Patalganga River about 10 kilometres (6 mi) southward of Jawaharlal Nehru Port (JNPT) and 16 kilometres (9.9 mi) south-east of Mumbai Port. It is controlled by the state government through the Maharashtra Maritime Board.

The town of Rewas was combined with the neighboring town of Bodani, and the subsequently formed city is called Rewas-Bodani.

== History ==
Originally called Rewas bunder (bunder=port), there has been a small fishing port at Rewas since the times of the Maratha Empire. A pier was subsequently built during the British Raj, between 1864 and 1869. This was often used by small passenger steamers running between Bombay and Dharamtar, which sailed via Rewas.

== Rewas Wadhawan New Port Project ==
In 2015, a project was announced by JNPT ports to establish a new port in Rewas. The port would consist of deep water berths on reclaimed land for various cargoes including coal. However, in June 2017, it was announced that the project had encountered stumbling blocks due to difficulties in clearances from the local environmental agencies at Dahanu.

== New Rewas Aware port ==
A new port was proposed near Rewas by port pioneer Dr. Meka Vijay Paparao of Amma Lines Pvt Ltd in 1996. In 1997 the state government signed an MOU with Amma Lines for development of Rewas and Aware for a multi-cargo deep draft all-weather port. In 2002, the cabinet signed the first port concession agreement in Maharashtra, for 50 years with Amma Lines to develop Rewas Aware port on a Build, Operate, Own, Share and Transfer (BOOST) basis. It formed an SPV known as Rewas Ports Ltd. for the purpose. With a starting investment of US$400 million and ultimate of about US$1 billion1.3 Billion (Rs 6600 Crore), the port was projected the potential to have over 50 berths with a draft as deep as 13 to 18 metres (43 to 59 ft).

In 2006, Amma Lines sold a majority stake to Mukesh Ambani's Reliance Group and Anand Jain's Jai Corp. The state government of Maharashtra also has a minor stake in the port. To start with, the port will have a 13-metre (43 ft) dredged draft, 10 berths with a total quay length of 3,500 metres (11,500 ft).

The project received Environmental Clearance from the Ministry of Environment & Forests, Government of India in May 2007 and also completed Financial Closure for the US$1.3 billion project. The port was due to be commissioned in 2011 and due for completion in 2012 with a draft of 18 metres (59 ft). As of 2017, the port has six berths handling containers, iron ore, coal and other solid and liquid bulk cargo.

The port required water access through Mumbai Port Trust waters. As this mega port would have created a challenge to the dwindling cargo of Mumbai Port, MbPT refused to give access through their waters. In spite of several representations made by the promoters, MMB and the state government, MbPT has still not given access since 2004. The matter is presently with the Ministry of Shipping.

There is also a proposal to develop a large dry dock, shipyard and ship repair facility; however these continue to remain on paper.

== Proposed second site for the proposed new Mumbai Metropolitan region Airport ==
Since the Union Ministry of Environment and Forests had raised objections to the proposed location of the Navi Mumbai International Airport near Kopra Panvel because the construction of the airport would involve reclamation of low-lying areas in an ecologically fragile zone as well as destruction of several hectares of mangroves. As a result of these developments other locations including Rewas were considered.

The proposed airport site centered around the region of Rewas and Mandwa near Alibag was thought to be the most suitable barring excessive financial cost for building a bridge over Karanja Creek to connect the Uran–JNPT area to the proposed airport at Rewas Mandwa. Its distance of only 20 nautical miles (37 km) by sea made it a viable location.

However, the site was rejected in 2010 after considering the high capital cost, destruction of scenic coastal environment, rehabilitation of 14 villages, strong local opposition and the presence of the Indian Navy base in the area.
