= Uttar Pradesh =

State in northern India

- State
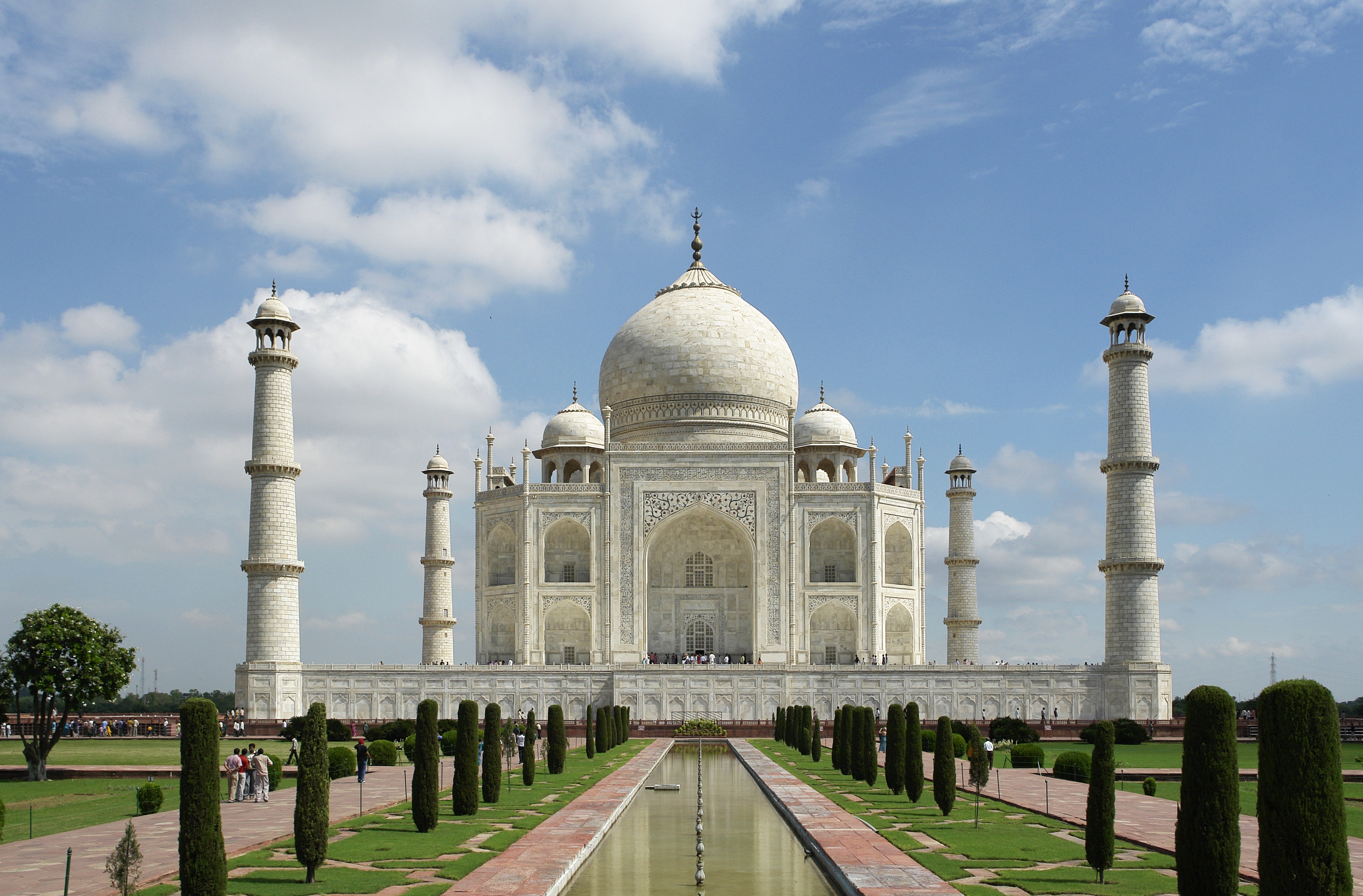
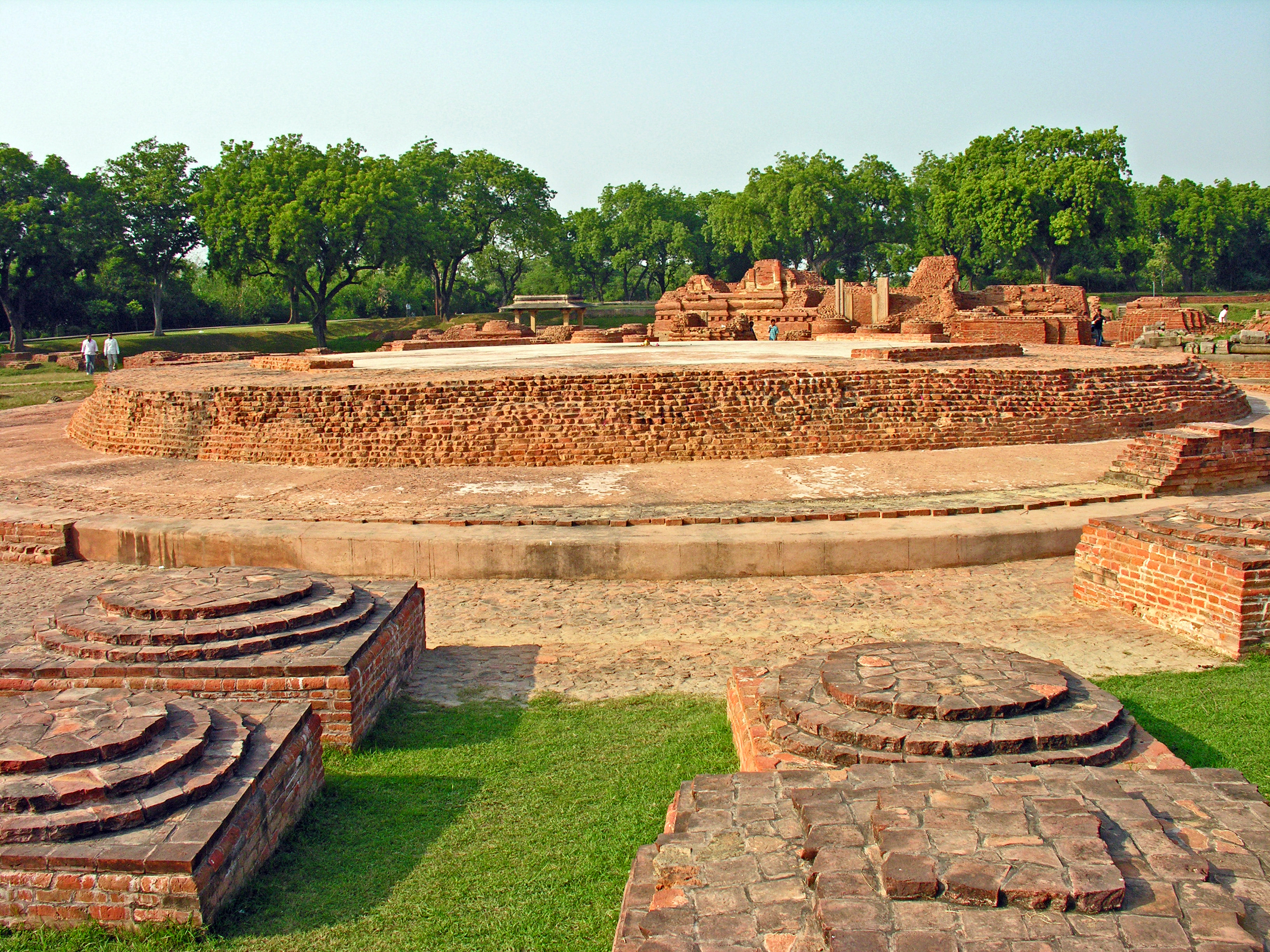
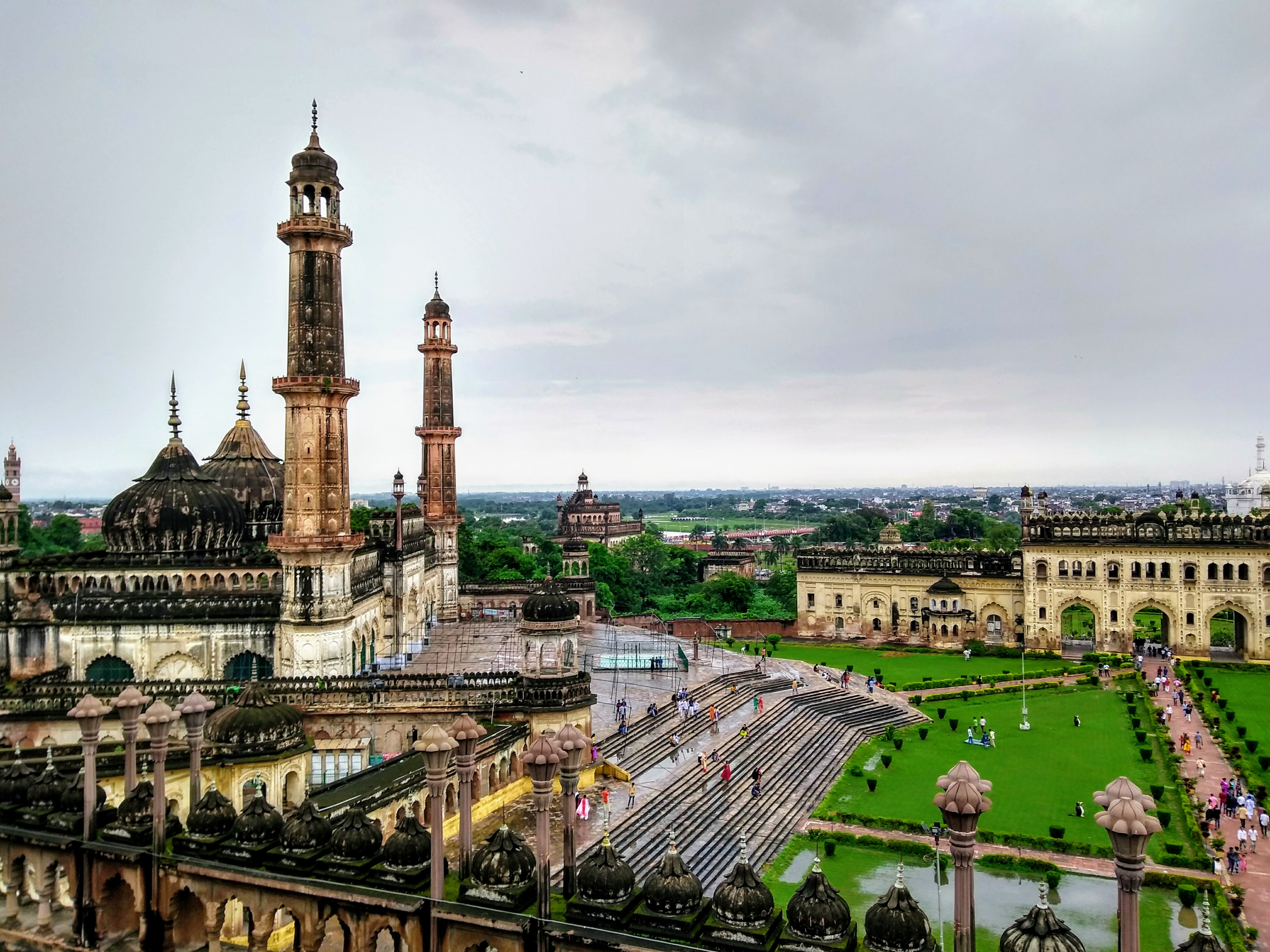
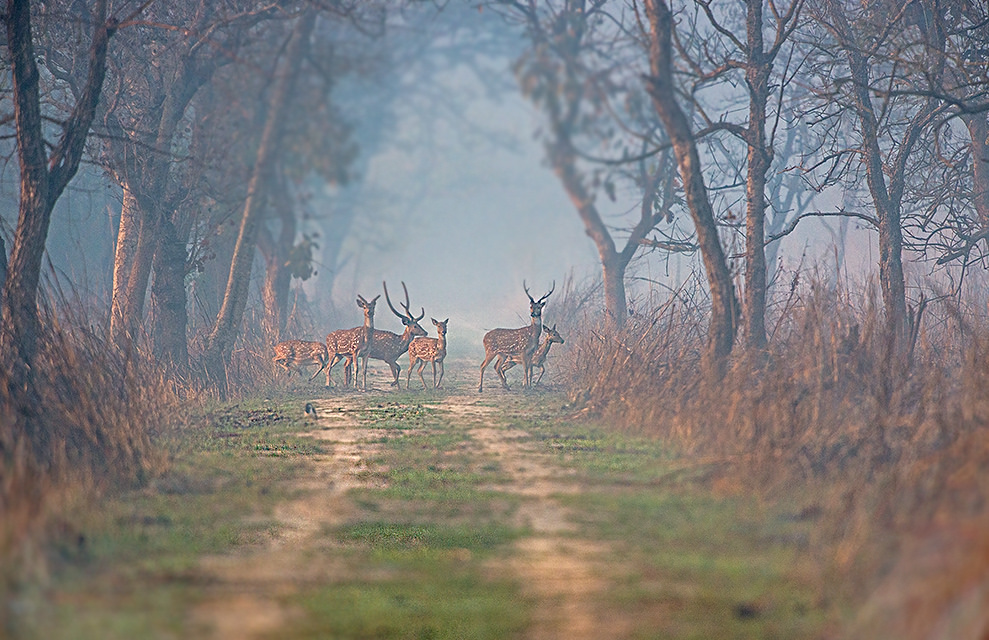
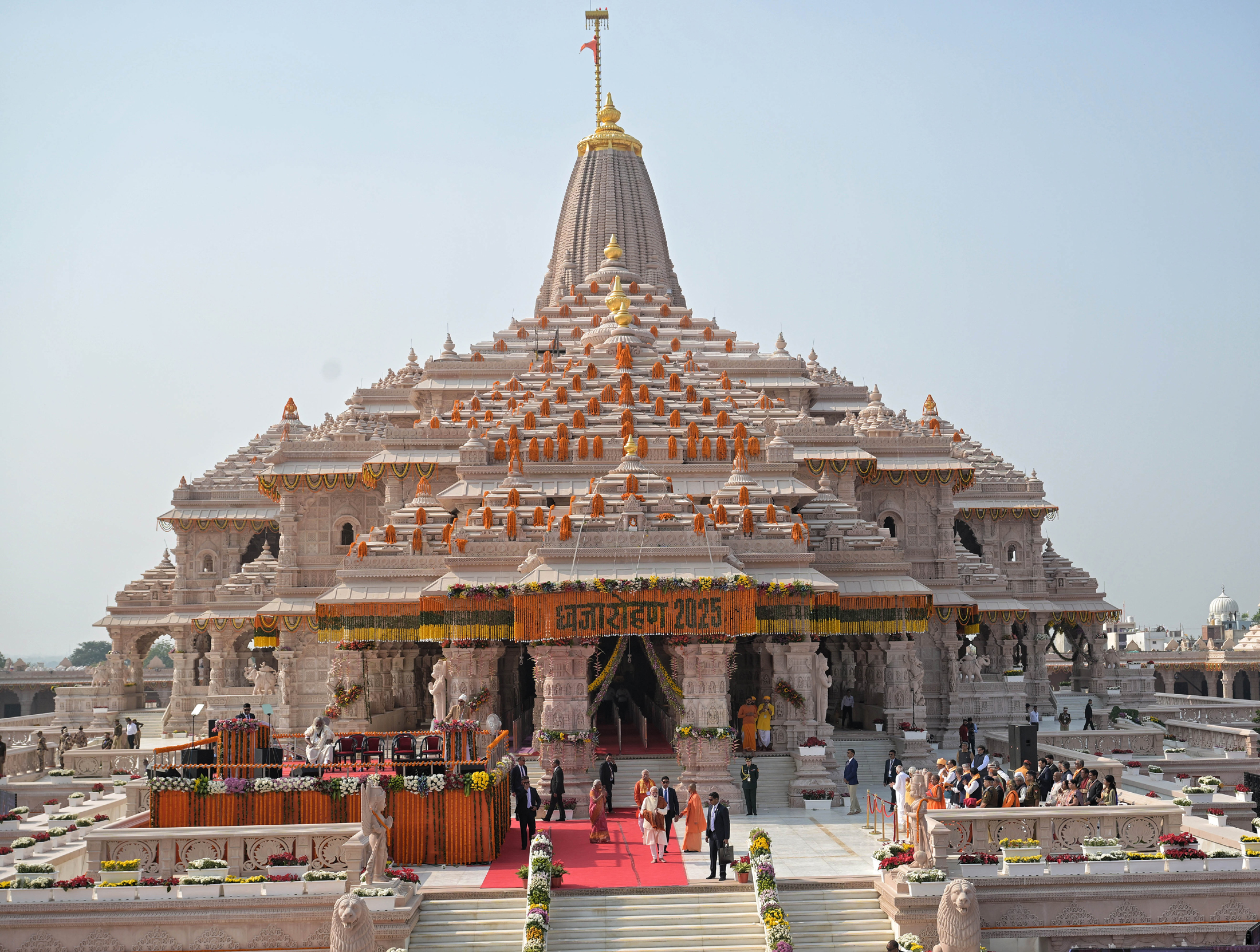
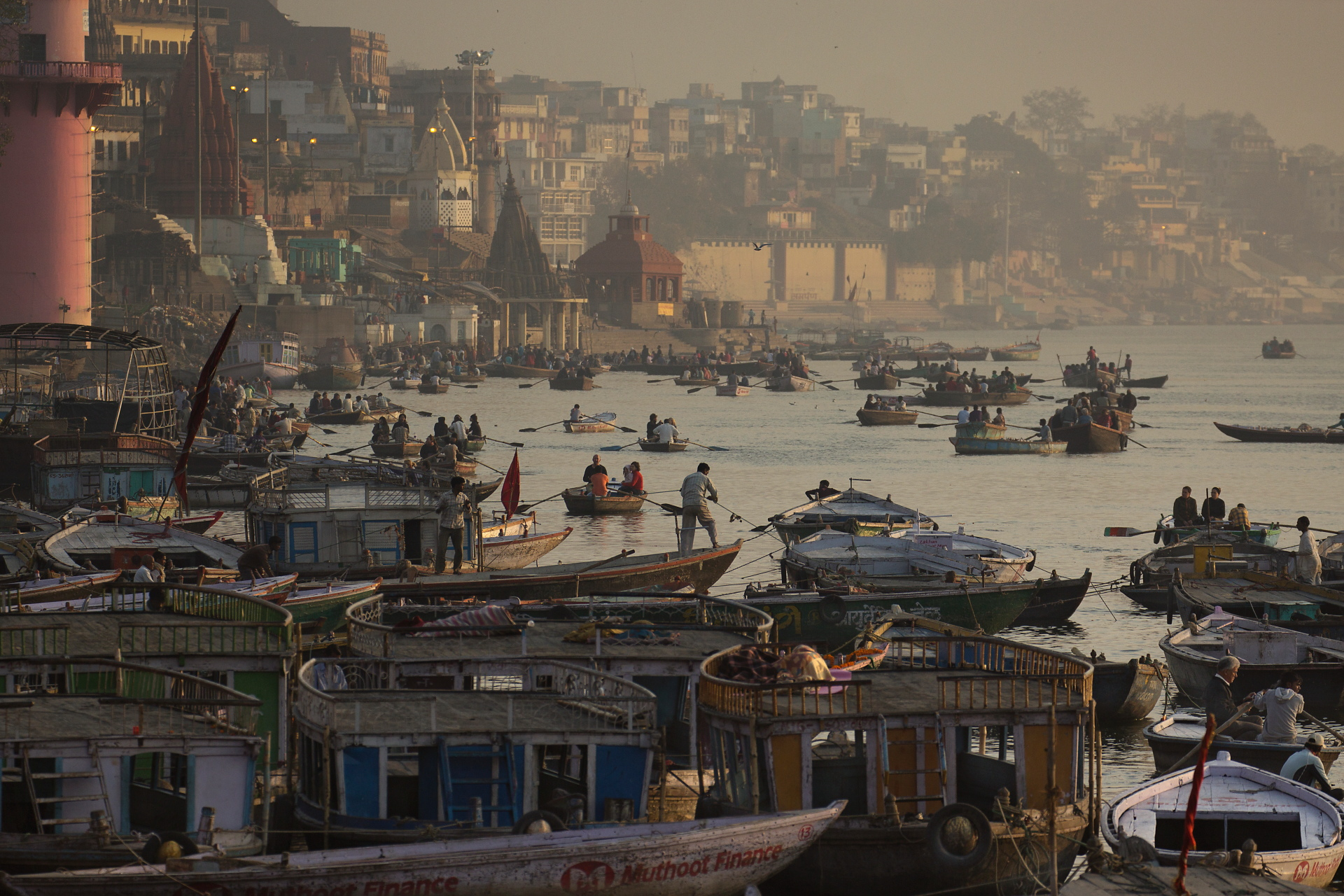
- Taj Mahal Sarnath Bara Imambara Dudhwa National Park Ram Mandir Varanasi Ghats

- Emblem of Uttar Pradesh
- Etymology: Northern Province
- Motto: Satyameva Jayate (Truth alone triumphs)
- Location of Uttar Pradesh in India
- Coordinates: 26.85°N 80.91°E
- Country: India
- Region: North India
- Previously was: United Provinces (1937–1950)
- Formation: 24 January 1950
- Capital and largest city: Lucknow
- Largest metro: Lucknow
- Districts: 75 (18 divisions)

Government
  - Body: Government of Uttar Pradesh
  - Governor: Anandiben Patel
  - Chief Minister: Yogi Adityanath (BJP)
  - Deputy Chief Minister: Keshav Prasad Maurya (BJP); Brajesh Pathak (BJP)

Area
  - Total: 243,286 km^{2} (93,933 sq mi)
  - Rank: 4th

Dimensions
  - Length: 650 km (400 mi)
  - Width: 240 km (150 mi)
- Highest elevation (Amsot Peak): 957 m (3,140 ft)
- Lowest elevation (Ganges River): 60 m (200 ft)

Population (2021)
  - Total: ▲241,066,874
  - Rank: 1st
  - Density: 1,001/km^{2} (2,590/sq mi)
  - Urban: 22.27%
  - Rural: 77.73%

Language
  - Official: Hindi
  - Additional official: Urdu
  - Official script: Devanagari script

GDP
  - Total (2026–2027): ▲₹39.8 lakh crore (US$410 billion) ▲$1.96 trillion (PPP)
  - Rank: 3rd
  - Per capita: ▲₹165,100 (US$1,700) (2023-24 FY)▲$8,117 (PPP) (28th)
- Time zone: UTC+05:30 (IST)
- ISO 3166 code: IN-UP
- Vehicle registration: UP
- HDI (2022): ▲0.609 Medium (34th)
- Literacy (2024): 78.2% (30th)
- Sex ratio (2021): 1015 ♀/1000 ♂ (19th)
- Website: up.gov.in
- Symbols of Uttar Pradesh
- Foundation day: Uttar Pradesh Day
- Bird: Sarus crane
- Flower: Palash
- Mammal: Barasingha
- Tree: Ashoka
- State highway mark
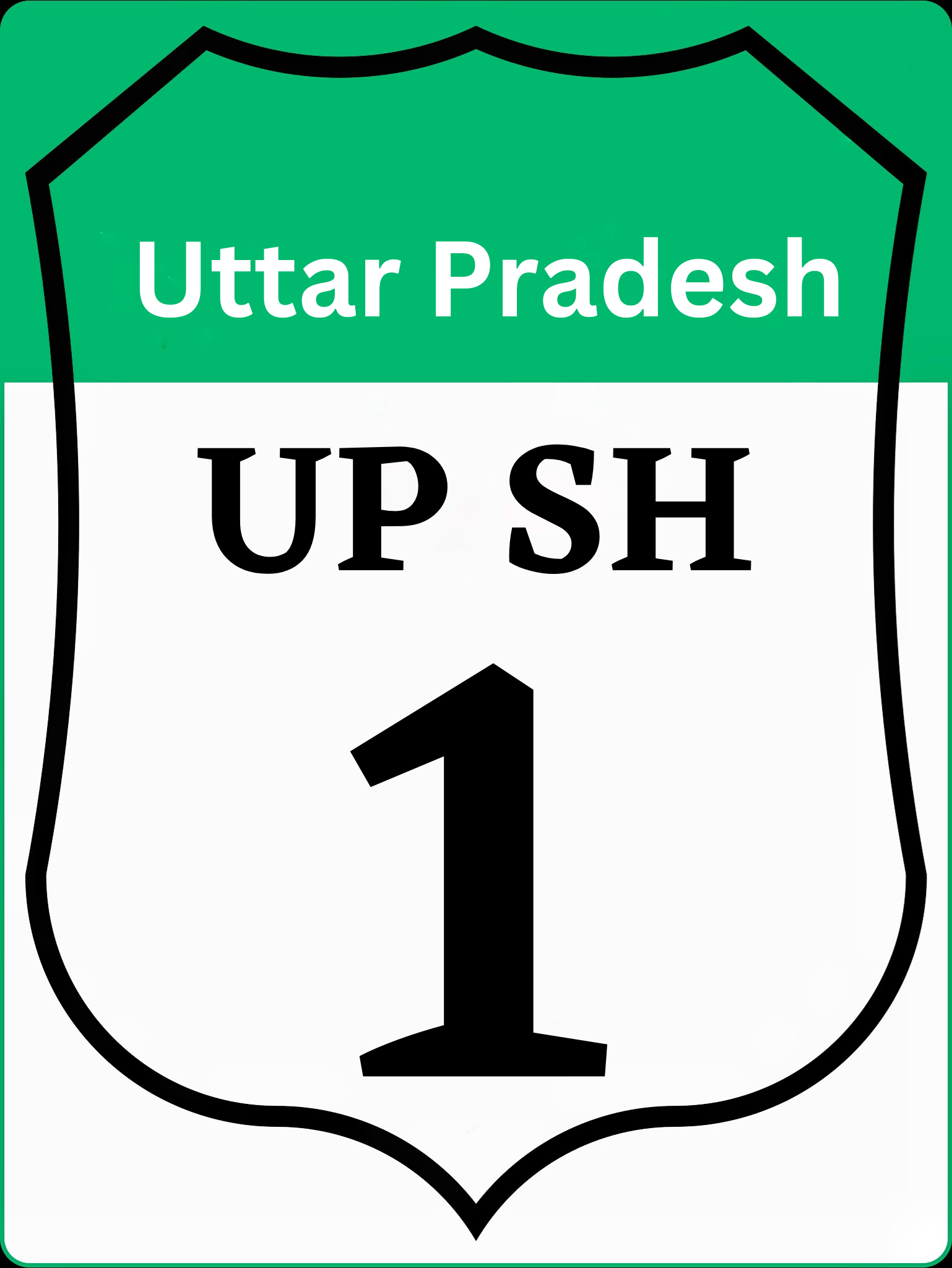
- State highway of Uttar Pradesh; UP SH1 – UP SH99
- List of Indian state symbols

Uttar Pradesh (UTT-ər prə-DESH, abbr. UP; Hindi: Uttar Pradēś, pronounced [ˈʊt̪ːəɾ pɾə.ˈdeːɕ], lit. 'Northern Province') is a state located in northern part of India. With over 241 million inhabitants, it is India's most populated state. The state is bordered by Rajasthan to the west, Haryana, Himachal Pradesh and Delhi to the northwest, Uttarakhand and Nepal to the north, Bihar to the east, Madhya Pradesh, Chhattisgarh and Jharkhand to the south. It is the fourth-largest Indian state by area covering 243,286 km^{2} (93,933 sq mi), accounting for 7.3 per cent of the total area of India. Lucknow is the state capital, while Prayagraj being the judicial capital. It is divided into 18 divisions and 75 districts. Uttar Pradesh is the Indian state with the highest number of bordering states, sharing its boundaries with nine other states and one union territory.

Uttar Pradesh was established in 1950 after India had become a republic. It is a successor to the United Provinces, established in 1935 by renaming the United Provinces of Agra and Oudh, in turn established in 1902 from the North-Western Provinces and the Oudh Province. The two major rivers of the state, the Ganges and its tributary Yamuna, meet at the Triveni Sangam in Prayagraj, a Hindu pilgrimage site. Other notable rivers are Gomti and Sarayu. Most of the state is covered by the Indo Gangetic plain which is intensely farmed. The forest cover in the state is 6.1 per cent of the state's geographical area, mainly in the northern Terai. The cultivable area is 82 per cent of the total geographical area, and the net area sown is 68.5 per cent of the cultivable area.

Uttar Pradesh encompasses several distinct cultural regions, forming a continuum from Braj and Rohilkhand in the west to Bundelkhand and Awadh in the centre and Purvanchal in the east. Hindi is the official and most widely-spoken language, with Urdu as an additional official language. The region has been a major centre of political and cultural development throughout Indian history. It formed part of the territories of several dominant Indian dynasties, including the Maurya, Gupta, Vardhana, Pala, Delhi Sultanate, and Mughal empires. During the British colonial period, the area contained several princely states, notably Rampur, Benares, and Ramgadi, and played a central role in the Indian independence movement, including the Indian Rebellion of 1857.

Though long known for sugar production, the state's economy is now dominated by the services industry. The service sector comprises travel and tourism, hotel industry, real estate, insurance and financial consultancies. The economy of Uttar Pradesh is just the third-largest state economy in India, with ₹39.8 trillion (US$410 billion) in gross domestic product and a per capita GSDP of ₹152,366 The High Court of the state is located in Prayagraj. The state plays an important role in national politics, sending 80 seats to the lower house Lok Sabha and 31 seats to the upper house Rajya Sabha. Uttar Pradesh is significant for several major world religions. It is home to many of Hinduism's most important pilgrimage sites, including Varanasi, Mathura, Ayodhya, and Prayagraj. The state is also important to Buddhism; Gautama Buddha delivered his first sermon at Sarnath near Varanasi. Several sites in the state are associated with Jainism, and Uttar Pradesh has been an important centre of Islamic culture, architecture, and learning since the medieval period. The state contains three UNESCO World Heritage Sites.

== History ==
=== Prehistory ===
The region of present-day Uttar Pradesh has been inhabited since prehistoric times, with evidence of modern human hunter-gatherers dating to between approximately 85,000 and 72,000 years ago. Archaeological finds from the Middle and Upper Paleolithic periods (c. 31,000–21,000 years ago) have been reported, while Mesolithic or microlithic settlements, such as those at Sarai Nahar Rai in Pratapgarh, date to around 10,550–9,550 BCE and indicate subsistence patterns based on hunting, fishing, and early burial practices.

Early Stone Age remains have also been identified in the Belan Valley, where tools such as hand axes and cleavers reflect long-term habitation by hunter-gatherer communities. Neolithic sites, including Koldihwa, provide evidence of early agriculture, including rice cultivation, alongside domestication of cattle, sheep, and goats, with village settlements emerging as early as 6000 BCE and gradually developing between c. 4000 and 1500 BCE. This developmental phase overlaps with broader cultural transitions from the Indus Valley Civilisation and Harappan traditions to the Vedic period.

During the Chalcolithic phase, the use of copper alongside stone tools is reflected in the Ochre Coloured Pottery culture at sites such as Atranjikhera, along with copper hoards found across the Ganga–Yamuna Doab. The subsequent Iron Age is marked by the Painted Grey Ware culture at sites including Hastinapur and Ahichchhatra, followed by the Northern Black Polished Ware (NBPW) culture at urban centres such as Kaushambi and Varanasi, amid increasing urbanisation and socio-economic complexity in the region.

=== Ancient and classical period ===
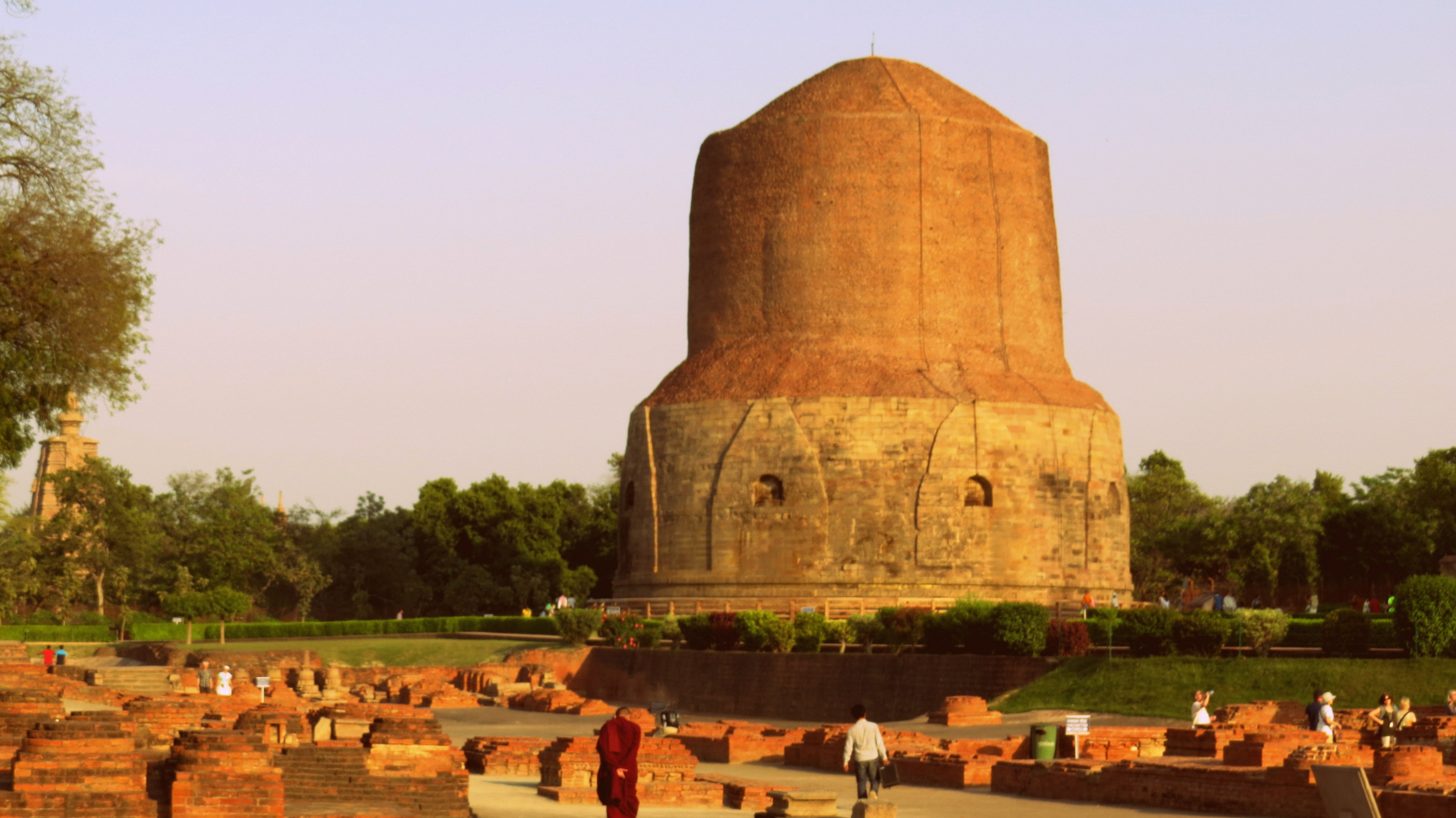
The Dhamekh Stupa in Sarnath is where Gautama Buddha first taught the Dharma, and where the Buddhist Sangha came into existence through the enlightenment of Kondanna.

Out of the sixteen mahajanapadas (lit. 'great realms') or oligarchic republics that existed in ancient India, seven fell entirely within the present-day boundaries of the state. The kingdom of Kosala, in the Mahajanapada era, was also located within the regional boundaries of modern-day Uttar Pradesh. According to Hinduism, the divine King Rama of the Ramayana epic reigned in Ayodhya, the capital of Kosala.

Krishna, another divine king of Hindu legend, who appears in the Mahabharata epic and is revered as the eighth reincarnation (Avatar) of the Hindu god Vishnu, is said to have been born in the city of Mathura. The aftermath of the Kurukshetra War is believed to have taken place in the area between the Upper Doab and Delhi, in what was Kuru Mahajanapada, during the reign of the Pandava King Yudhishthira. The kingdom of the Kurus corresponds to the Black and Red Ware and Painted Gray Ware culture and the beginning of the Iron Age in northwest India, around 1000 BCE.

Control over Gangetic plains region was of vital importance to the power and stability of all of India's major empires, including the Maurya (320–200 BCE), Kushan (100–250 CE), Gupta (350–600), and Gurjara-Pratihara (650–1036) empires. Following the Huns' invasions that broke the Gupta empire, the Ganges-Yamuna Doab saw the rise of Kannauj. During the reign of Harshavardhana (590–647), the Kannauj empire reached its zenith. It spanned from Punjab in the north and Gujarat in the west to Bengal in the east and Odisha in the south. It included parts of central India, north of the Narmada River and it encompassed the entire Indo-Gangetic Plain.

Many communities in various parts of India claim descent from the migrants of Kannauj. Soon after Harshavardhana's death, his empire disintegrated into many kingdoms, which were invaded and ruled by the Gurjara-Pratihara empire, which challenged Bengal's Pala Empire for control of the region. Kannauj was several times invaded by the South Indian Rashtrakuta dynasty, from the 8th century to the 10th century. After the fall of the Pala empire, the Chero dynasty ruled from the 12th century to the 18th century.

==== Delhi Sultanate ====
Uttar Pradesh was partially or entirely ruled by the Delhi Sultanate for 320 years (1206–1526). Five dynasties ruled over the Delhi Sultanate sequentially: the Mamluk dynasty (1206–90), the Khalji dynasty (1290–1320), the Tughlaq dynasty (1320–1414), the Sayyid dynasty (1414–51), and the Lodi dynasty (1451–1526).

The first Sultan of Delhi, Qutb ud-Din Aibak, conquered some parts of Uttar Pradesh, including Meerut, Aligarh, and Etawah. His successor, Iltutmish, expanded the Sultanate's rule over Uttar Pradesh by defeating the King of Kannauj. During the reign of Sultan Balban, the Mamluk dynasty faced numerous rebellions in the state, but he was able to suppress them and establish his authority. Alauddin Khilji, extended his conquests to various regions in the state, including Varanasi and Prayagraj.

Apart from the rulers, the Delhi Sultanate era also saw the growth of Sufism in Uttar Pradesh. Sufi saints, such as Nizamuddin Auliya and Qutbuddin Bakhtiar Kaki, lived during this period and their teachings had a significant impact on the people of the region. Sultanat era in the state also witnessed the construction of mosques and tombs, including the Atala Masjid in Jaunpur, the Jama Masjid in Fatehpur Sikri, and the Ghiyath al-Din Tughluq's Tomb in Tughlaqabad.

=== Medieval and early modern period ===
In the 16th century, Babur, a Timurid descendant of Timur and Genghis Khan from Fergana Valley (modern-day Uzbekistan), swept across the Khyber Pass and founded the Mughal Empire, covering India, along with modern-day Afghanistan, Pakistan and Bangladesh. The Mughals were descended from Persianised Central Asian Turks (with significant Mongol admixture). In the Mughal era, Uttar Pradesh became the heartland of the empire. Mughal emperors Babur and Humayun ruled from Delhi.

In 1540 an Afghan, Sher Shah Suri, took over the reins of Uttar Pradesh after defeating the Mughal King Humanyun. Sher Shah and his son Islam Shah ruled Uttar Pradesh from their capital at Gwalior. After the death of Islam Shah Suri, his prime minister Hemu became the de facto ruler of Uttar Pradesh, Bihar, Madhya Pradesh, and the western parts of Bengal. He was bestowed the title of Hemchandra Vikramaditya (title of Vikramāditya adopted from Vedic period) at his coronation at Purana Qila in Delhi on 7 October 1556. A month later, Hemu died in the Second Battle of Panipat, and Uttar Pradesh came under Emperor Akbar's rule. Akbar ruled from Agra and Fatehpur Sikri.

In the 18th century, after the fall of Mughal authority, the power vacuum was filled by the Maratha Empire, in the mid-18th century, the Maratha army invaded the Uttar Pradesh region, which resulted in Rohillas losing control of Rohilkhand to the Maratha forces led by Raghunath Rao and Malha Rao Holkar. The conflict between Rohillas and Marathas came to an end on 18 December 1788 with the arrest of Ghulam Qadir, the grandson of Najeeb-ud-Daula, who was defeated by the Maratha general Mahadaji Scindia. In 1803–04, following the Second Anglo-Maratha War, when the British East India Company defeated the Maratha Empire, much of the region came under British suzerainty.

==== British India era ====
Timeline of reorganisation and name changes of UP
- 1807: Ceded and Conquered Provinces
- 14 November 1834: Presidency of Agra
- 1 January 1836: North-Western Provinces
- 3 April 1858: Oudh taken under British control, Delhi taken away from NWP and merged into Punjab
- 1 April 1871: Ajmer, Merwara & Kekri made separate commissioner-ship
- 15 February 1877: Oudh added to North-Western Provinces
- 22 March 1902: Renamed United Provinces of Agra and Oudh
- 3 January 1921: Renamed United Provinces of British India
- 1 April 1937: Renamed United Provinces
- 1 April 1946: Self rule granted
- 15 August 1947: Part of independent India
- 24 January 1950: Renamed Uttar Pradesh
- 9 November 2000: Uttaranchal state, now known as Uttarakhand, created from part of Uttar Pradesh

Starting from Bengal in the second half of the 18th century, a series of battles for north Indian lands finally gave the British East India Company accession over the state's territories. Ajmer and Jaipur kingdoms were also included in this northern territory, which was named the "North-Western Provinces" (of Agra). Although UP later became the fifth-largest state of India, NWPA was one of the smallest states of the British Indian empire. Its capital shifted twice between Agra and Allahabad.

Due to dissatisfaction with British rule, a serious rebellion erupted in parts of North India, which became known as the Indian Rebellion of 1857. The Bengal regiment's sepoy stationed at Meerut cantonment, Mangal Pandey, is widely considered as its starting point. After the revolt failed, the British divided the most rebellious regions by reorganising their administrative boundaries. The Delhi region was split from 'NWFP of Agra' and merged with Punjab Province. The Ajmer–Marwar region was merged with Rajputana and Oudh was incorporated into the state. The new state was called the North Western Provinces of Agra and Oudh, which in 1902 was renamed as the United Provinces of Agra and Oudh. It was commonly referred to as the United Provinces or its acronym UP.

In 1920, the capital of the province was shifted from Allahabad to Lucknow. The high court continued to be at Allahabad, but a bench was established at Lucknow. Allahabad continues to be an important administrative base of today's Uttar Pradesh and has several administrative headquarters. Uttar Pradesh continued to be central to Indian politics and was especially important in modern Indian history as a hotbed of the Indian independence movement. The state hosted modern educational institutions such as the Aligarh Muslim University, Banaras Hindu University and Darul Uloom Deoband.

Nationally known figures such as Ram Prasad Bismil and Chandra Shekhar Azad were among the leaders of the movement in Uttar Pradesh. Motilal Nehru, Jawaharlal Nehru, Madan Mohan Malaviya and Govind Ballabh Pant were important national leaders of the Indian National Congress. The All India Kisan Sabha was formed at the Lucknow session of the Congress on 11 April 1936, with the famous nationalist Sahajanand Saraswati elected as its first president, to address the longstanding grievances of the peasantry and mobilise them against the zamindari landlords' attacks on their occupancy rights, thus sparking the farmers movements in India. During the Quit India Movement of 1942, Ballia district overthrew the colonial authority and installed an independent administration under Chittu Pandey. Ballia became known as "Baghi Ballia" (Rebel Ballia) due to its role in India's independence movement.

==== Post-independence ====
After India's independence, the United Provinces were renamed "Uttar Pradesh" (lit. 'northern province'), preserving UP as the abbreviation of the state's name, with the change coming into effect on 24 January 1950. The new state was formed after the merger of several princely states and territories, including the United Provinces of Agra and Oudh, and the Delhi territory. The state has provided nine of India's prime ministers, which is more than any other state, and is the source of the largest number of seats in the Lok Sabha. Although politically influential since ancient times, its poor record in economic development and administration, poor governance, organised crime and corruption have kept it among India's backward states. The state has been affected by repeated episodes of caste-related and communal violence. In December 1992 the disputed Babri Mosque located in Ayodhya was demolished by Hindu activists, leading to widespread violence across India. In 2000, northern districts of the state were separated to form the state of Uttarakhand.

== Geography ==
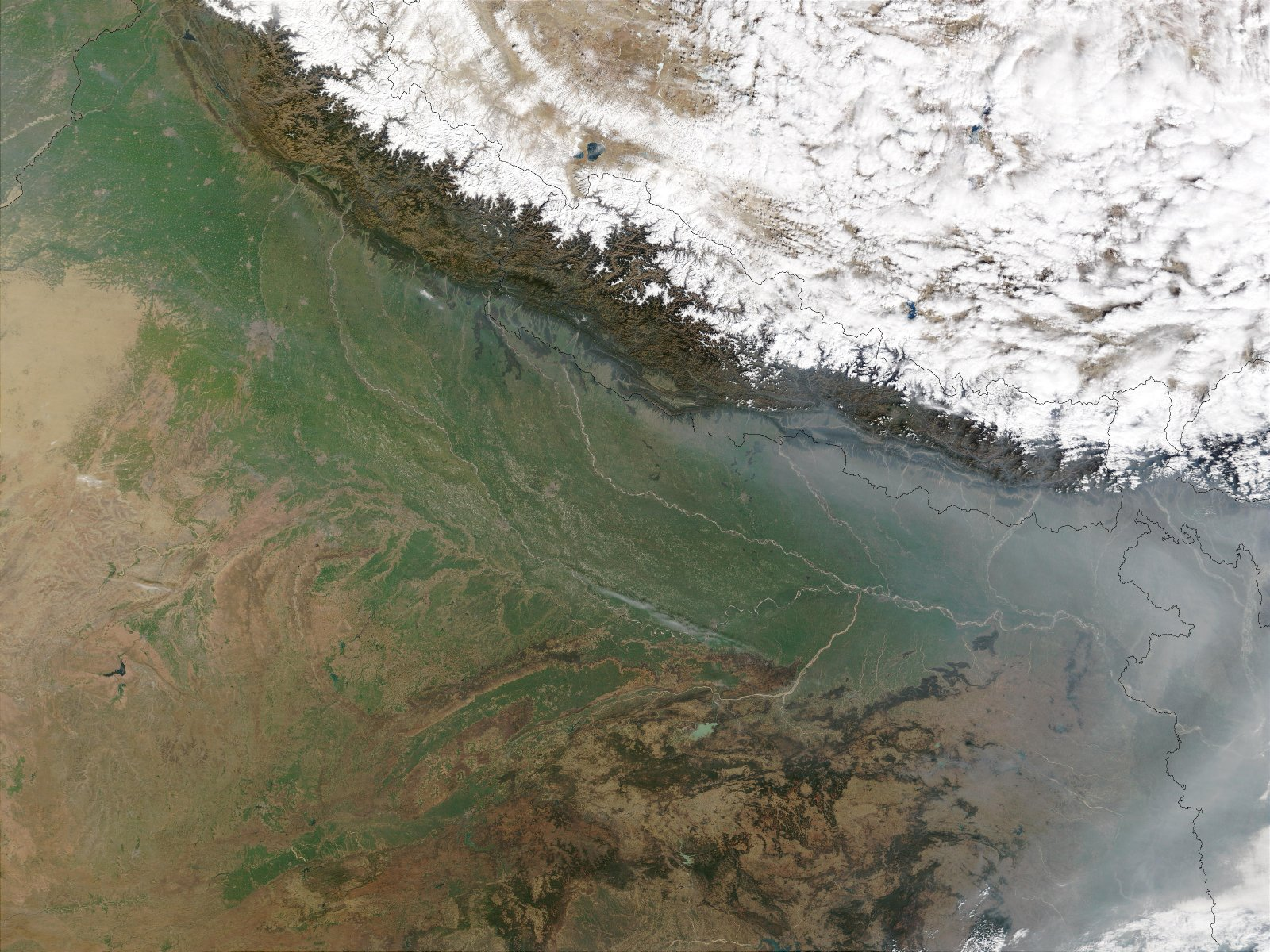
A part of the Gangetic Plain

Uttar Pradesh, with a total area of 240,928 km^{2} (93,023 sq mi), is India's fourth-largest state in terms of land area and is roughly of same size as United Kingdom. It is situated on the northern spout of India and shares an international boundary with Nepal. The Himalayas border the state on the north, but the plains that cover most of the state are distinctly different from those high mountains. The larger Gangetic Plain region is in the north; it includes the Ganges-Yamuna Doab, the Ghaghra plains, the Ganges plains and the Terai. The smaller Vindhya Range and plateau region are in the south. It is characterised by hard rock strata and a varied topography of hills, plains, valleys and plateaus. The Bhabar tract gives place to the Terai, which is covered with tall elephant grass and thick forests interspersed with marshes and swamps. The sluggish rivers of the bhabhar deepen in this area, their course running through a tangled mass of thick undergrowth. The Terai runs parallel to the Bhabhar in a thin strip. The entire alluvial plain is divided into three sub-regions. The first in the eastern tract consisting of 14 districts which are subject to periodical floods and droughts and have been classified as scarcity areas. These districts have the highest population density, which gives the lowest per capita land. The other two regions, the central and the western, are comparatively better with a well-developed irrigation system. They suffer from waterlogging and large-scale user tracts. In addition, the area is fairly arid. The state has more than 32 large and small rivers; of them, the Ganga, Yamuna, Saraswati, Sarayu, Betwa, and Ghaghara are larger and of religious importance in Hinduism.

Cultivation is intensive in the state. Uttar Pradesh falls under three agro-climatic zones viz. Middle Gangetic Plains region (Zone–IV), Upper Gangetic Plains region (Zone–V) and Central Plateau and Hills region (Zone–VIII). The valley areas have fertile soil. There is intensive cultivation on terraced hill slopes, but irrigation facilities are deficient. The Siwalik Range which forms the southern foothills of the Himalayas, slopes down into a boulder bed called 'bhabhar'. The transitional belt running along the entire length of the state is called the Terai and Bhabhar area. It has dense forests, cutting across it are innumerable streams which swell into raging torrents during the monsoon.

=== Climate ===
Agra

Climate chart (precipitation, max. and min. temperature)
J	F	M	A	M	J	J	A	S	O	N	D
9 22 8	12 25 10	10 32 16	10 39 22	16 42 27	67 41 29	196 35 27	227 34 26	113 34 24	27 34 20	3 30 14	5 24 9
- █ Average max. and min. temperatures in °C
- █ Precipitation totals in mm
- Source: NOAA
Imperial conversion
J	F	M	A	M	J	J	A	S	O	N	D
0.4 72 46	0.5 77 51	0.4 90 61	0.4 101 72	0.6 107 80	2.6 105 83	7.7 95 80	8.9 93 78	4.4 94 76	1.1 94 68	0.1 85 57	0.2 75 48
- █ Average max. and min. temperatures in °F
- █ Precipitation totals in inches

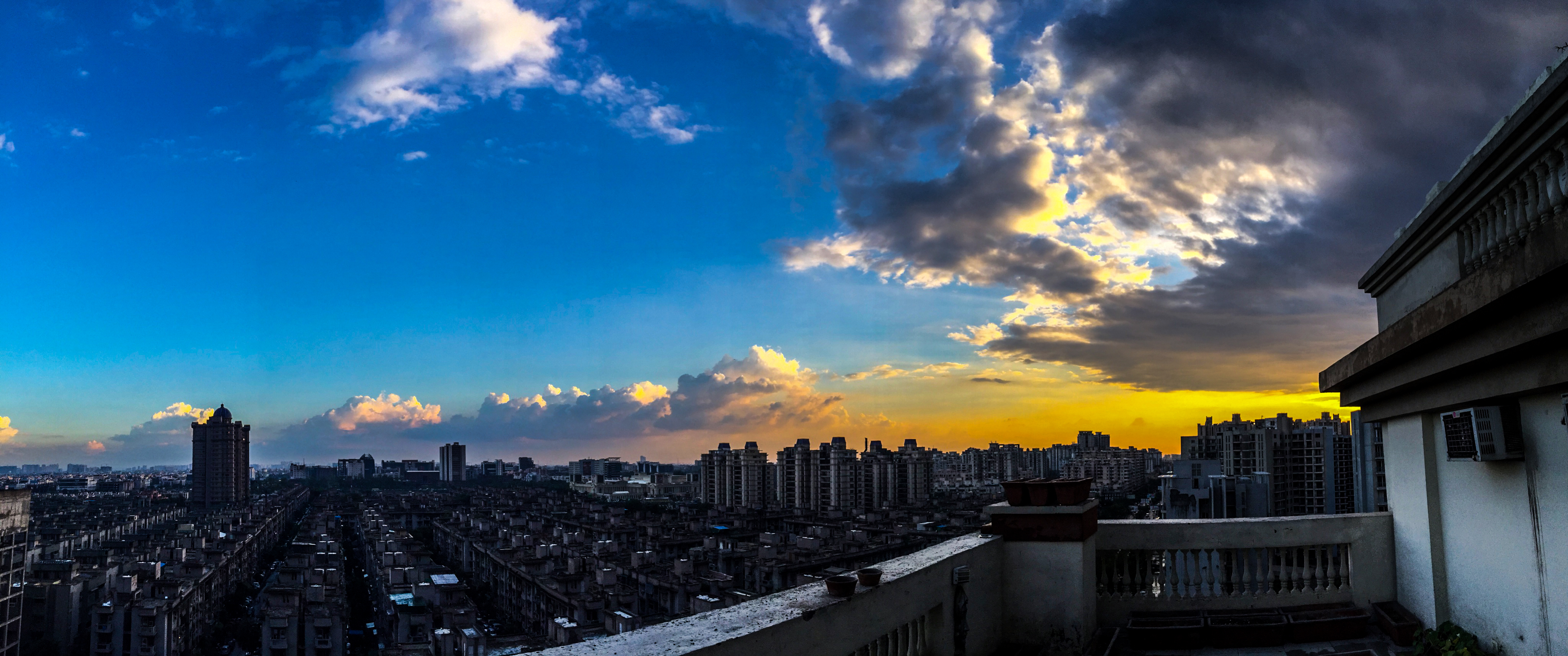
Monsoon clouds over Indirapuram

Uttar Pradesh has a humid subtropical climate and experiences four seasons. The winter in January and February is followed by summer between March and May and the monsoon season between June and September. Summers are extreme with temperatures fluctuating anywhere between 0–50 °C (32–122 °F) in parts of the state coupled with dry hot winds called the Loo. The Gangetic plain varies from semiarid to sub-humid. The mean annual rainfall ranges from 650 mm (26 in) in the southwest corner of the state to 1,000 mm (39 in) in the eastern and south eastern parts of the state. The Bay of Bengal branch of the Indian monsoon is the major bearer of rain in most parts of state. After summer it is the southwest monsoon which brings most of the rain here, while in winters rain due to the western disturbances and north-east monsoon also contribute small quantities towards the overall precipitation of the state.

The rain in Uttar Pradesh can vary from an annual average of 170 cm (67 in) in hilly areas to 84 cm (33 in) in Western Uttar Pradesh. Given the concentration of most of this rainfall in the four months of the monsoon, excess rain can lead to floods and then the shortage of rain can lead to droughts. As such, these two phenomena, floods and droughts, commonly recur in the state. The climate of the Vindhya Range and plateau is subtropical, with a mean annual rainfall between 1,000 and 1,200 mm (39 and 47 in), most of which comes during the monsoon. Typical summer months are from March to June, with maximum temperatures ranging from 30–38 °C (86–100 °F). There is a low relative humidity of around 20 per cent and dust-laden winds blow throughout the season. In summer, hot winds called loo blow all across Uttar Pradesh.

=== Flora and fauna ===
State symbols of Uttar Pradesh
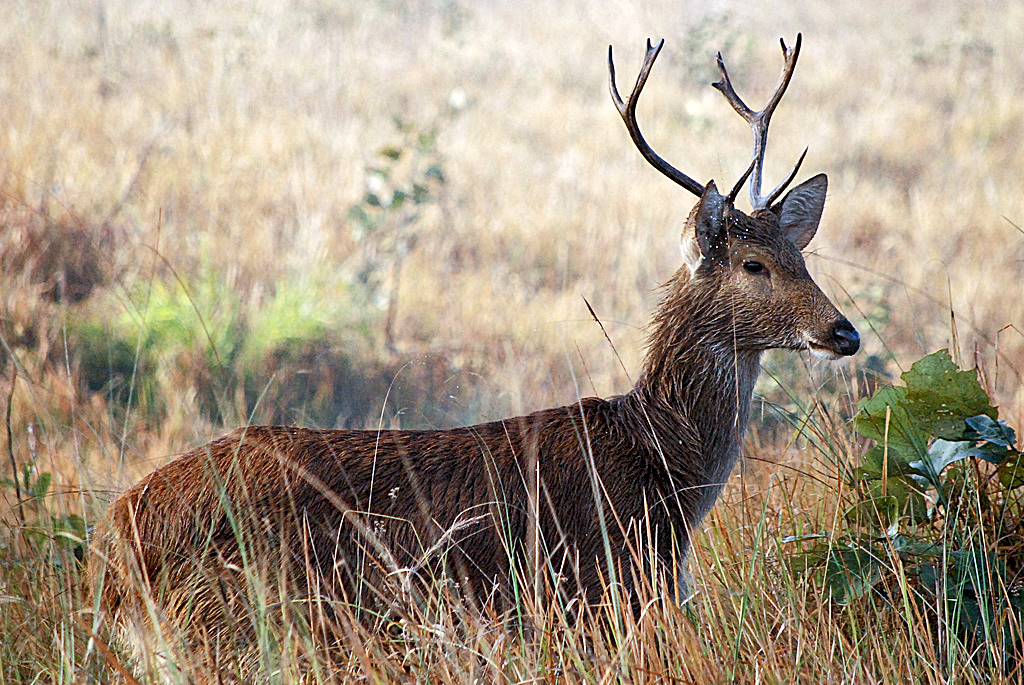
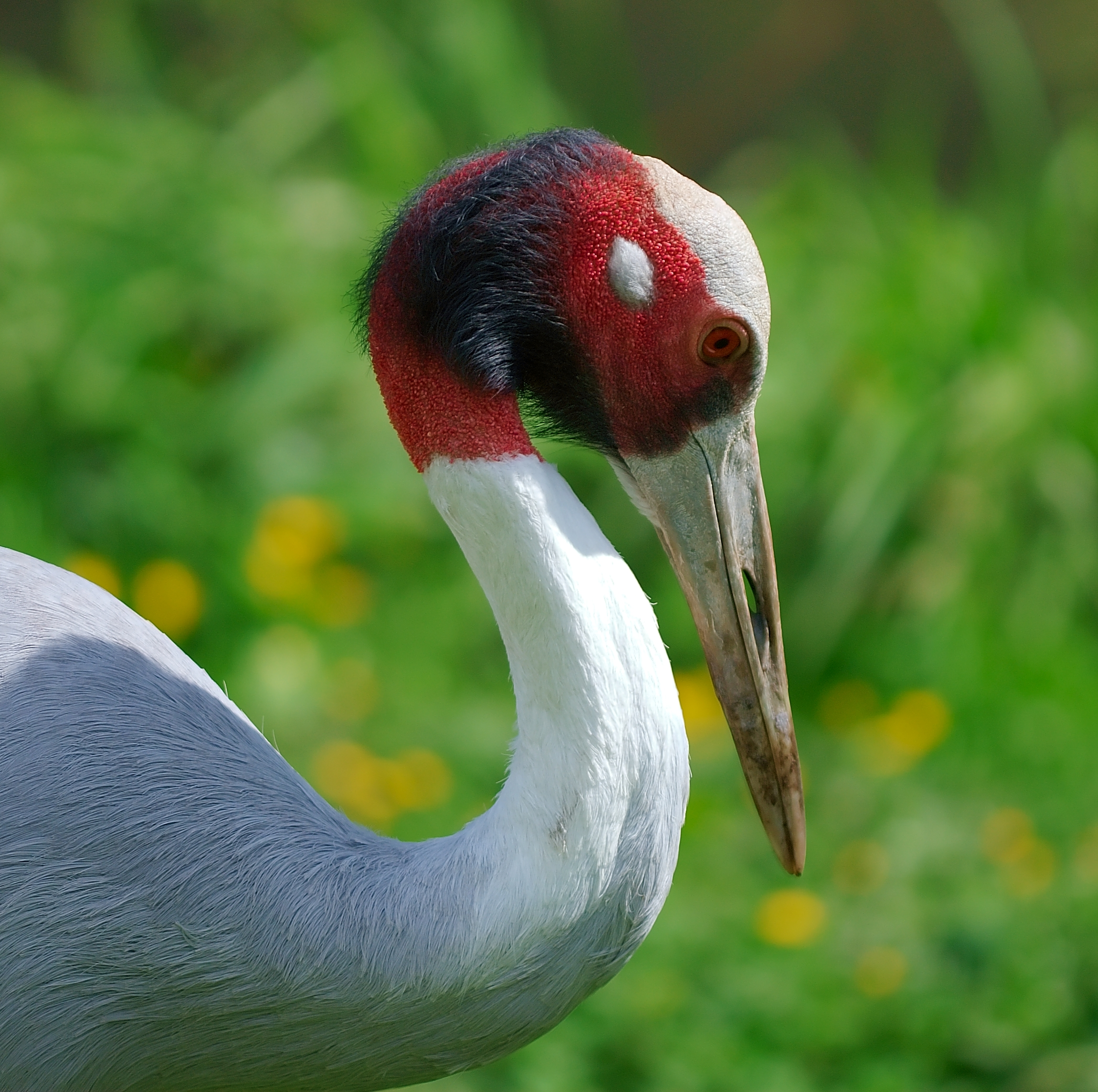
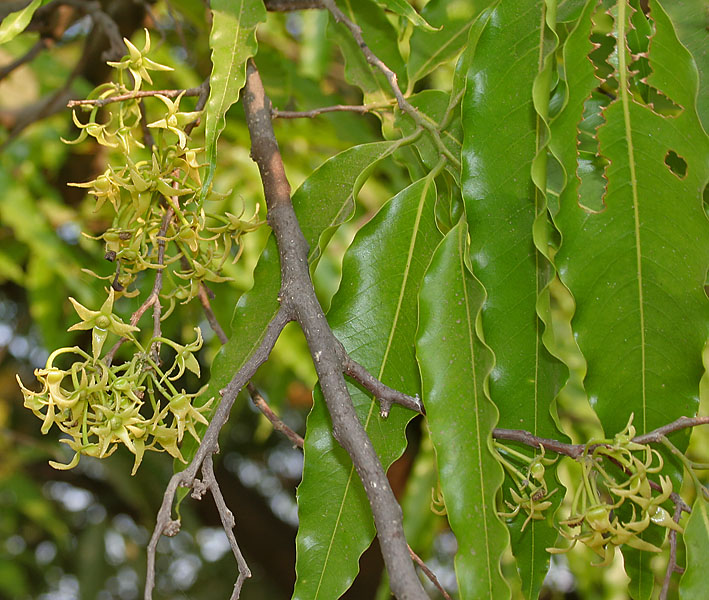
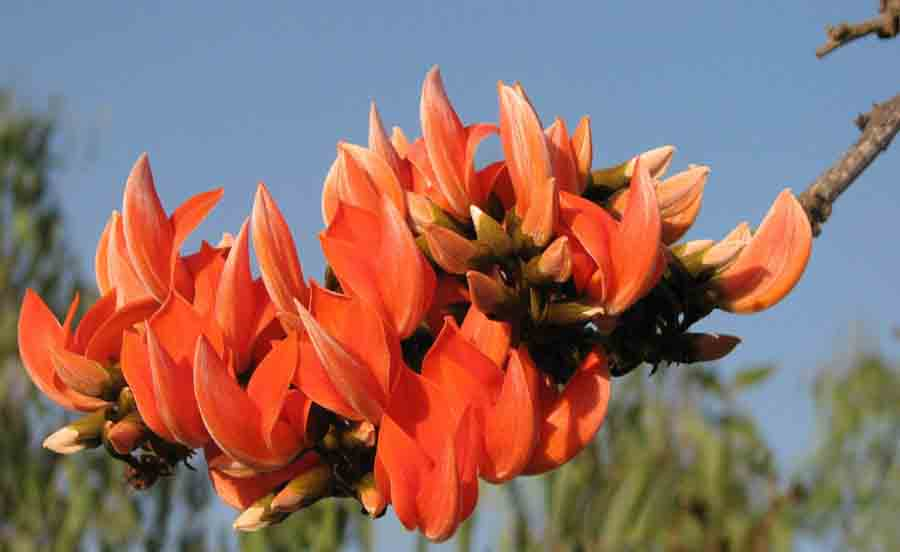
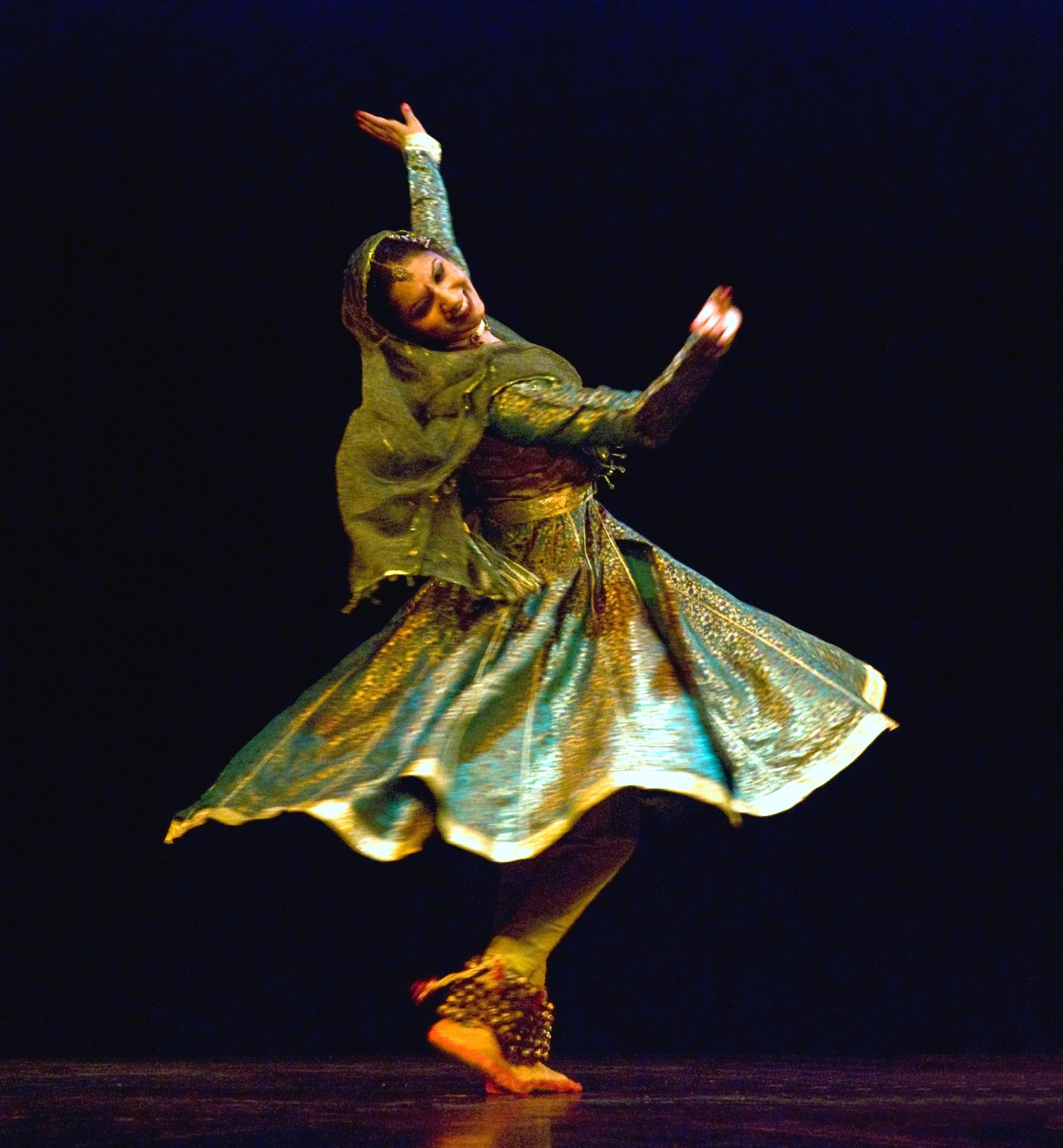
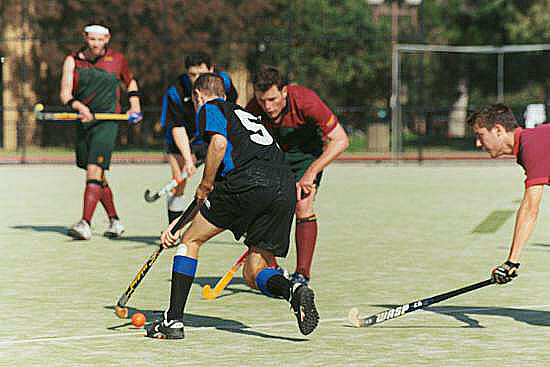
State animal	Swamp deer (Rucervus duvaucelii)
State bird	Sarus crane (Antigone antigone)
State tree	Ashoka (Saraca asoca)
State flower	Palash (Butea monosperma)
State dance	Kathak
State sport	Field hockey

Uttar Pradesh has an abundance of natural resources. In 2011, the recorded forest area in the state was 16,583 km^{2} (6,403 sq mi) which is about 6.9 per cent of the state's geographical area. In spite of rapid deforestation and poaching of wildlife, a diverse flora and fauna continue to exist in the state. Uttar Pradesh is a habitat for 4.2 per cent of all species of Algae recorded in India, 6.4 per cent of Fungi, 6.0 per cent of Lichens, 2.9 per cent of Bryophytes, 3.3 per cent of Pteridophytes, 8.7 per cent of Gymnosperms, 8.1 per cent of Angiosperms. Several species of trees, large and small mammals, reptiles, and insects are found in the belt of temperate upper mountainous forests. Medicinal plants are found in the wild and are also grown in plantations. The Terai–Duar savanna and grasslands support cattle. Moist deciduous trees grow in the upper Gangetic plain, especially along its riverbanks. This plain supports a wide variety of plants and animals. The Ganges and its tributaries are the habitat of large and small reptiles, amphibians, freshwater fish, and crabs. Scrubland trees such as the Babool (Vachellia nilotica) and animals such as the Chinkara (Gazella bennettii) are found in the arid Vindhyas. Tropical dry deciduous forests are found in all parts of the plains. Since much sunlight reaches the ground, shrubs and grasses are also abundant. Large tracts of these forests have been cleared for cultivation. Tropical thorny forests, consisting of widely scattered thorny trees, mainly babool are mostly found in the southwestern parts of the state.

Uttar Pradesh is known for its extensive avifauna. The most common birds which are found in the state are doves, peafowl, junglefowl, black partridges, house sparrows, songbirds, blue jays, parakeets, quails, bulbuls, comb ducks, kingfishers, woodpeckers, snipes, and parrots. Bird sanctuaries in the state include Bakhira Sanctuary, National Chambal Sanctuary, Chandra Prabha Wildlife Sanctuary, Hastinapur Wildlife Sanctuary, Kaimoor Wildlife Sanctuary, and Okhla Sanctuary.

Other animals in the state include reptiles such as lizards, cobras, kraits, and gharials. Among the wide variety of fishes, the most common ones are mahseer and trout. Some animal species have gone extinct in recent years, while others, such as the Indian rhinoceros in the Terai region, Ganges river dolphin in the Ganges have become endangered. Many species are vulnerable to poaching despite regulation by the government.

== Divisions, districts and cities ==
Divisions of Uttar Pradesh

Uttar Pradesh is divided into 75 districts under these 18 divisions:

1. Saharanpur
2. Moradabad
3. Bareilly
4. Meerut
5. Aligarh
6. Agra
7. Devipatan
8. Basti
9. Gorakhpur
10. Kanpur
11. Lucknow
12. Ayodhya
13. Azamgarh
14. Jhansi
15. Chitrakoot
16. Prayagraj
17. Varanasi
18. Mirzapur

The following is a list of top districts from state of Uttar Pradesh by population, ranked in respect of all India.

Rank (in India)	District	Population	Growth rate (%)	Sex ratio (females per 1000 males)	Literacy rate (%)
13	Prayagraj	5,954,391	20.63	901	72.32
26	Moradabad	4,772,006	25.22	906	56.77
27	Ghaziabad	4,681,645	42.27	881	78.07
30	Azamgarh	4,613,913	17.11	1019	70.93
31	Lucknow	4,589,838	25.82	917	77.29
32	Kanpur Nagar	4,581,268	9.92	862	79.65
41	Agra	4,418,797	22.05	868	71.58
50	Bareilly	4,448,359	22.93%	887	58.5

Each district is administered by a District Magistrate (DM), who is an Indian Administrative Service (IAS) officer appointed Government of Uttar Pradesh and reports to Divisional Commissioner of the division in which his/her district falls. The Divisional Commissioner is an IAS officer of high seniority, and part of revenue department. Each district is divided into subdivisions, administered by a Sub-Divisional Magistrate, and again into Tehsils for land revenue administration. Each district is divided into Blocks, for rural development administration, and consists of gram panchayats (village councils). These blocks consists of urban units viz. census towns and rural units called gram panchayat.

Local governance comprises Panchayati Raj Institutions in rural areas including Zilla Parishads, Kshettra Panchayats, and Gram Panchayats as well as urban local bodies such as Nagar Nigams (municipal corporations), Nagar Palikas (municipal councils), and Nagar Panchayats, all governed by elected councils with five-year terms.

Uttar Pradesh has more metropolitan cities than any other state in India. The absolute urban population of the state is 44.4 million, which constitutes 11.8 per cent of the total urban population of India, the second-highest of any state. In the 2011 census, there were 15 urban agglomerations with a population greater than 500,000. Uttar Pradesh has a complex system of municipalities. Nagar Nigam (Municipal Corporation) are urban local bodies in large cities such as Lucknow, Kanpur, Varanasi and cities having population more than 4 million. These governed by a mayor and councillors elected from wards. Nagar Palika Parishad or Municipal Council, serves medium-sized towns like Bela Pratapgarh, Jalaun, or Bisalpur and are governed by a chairperson and councillors. Nagar Panchayat which operate in smaller towns and semi-urban areas like Badlapur, Jaunpur, Bikapur, or Chilkana Sultanpur, are governed by a chairman and councillors. There are 14 Municipal Corporations. Noida and Greater Noida in Gautam Budha Nagar district are specially administered by statutory authorities under the Uttar Pradesh Industrial Development Act of 1976.

In 2011, state's cabinet ministers headed by the then Chief Minister Mayawati announced the separation of Uttar Pradesh into four different states of Purvanchal, Bundelkhand, Avadh Pradesh and Paschim Pradesh with twenty-eight, seven, twenty-three and seventeen districts, respectively, later the proposal was turned down when the Akhilesh Yadav–led Samajwadi Party came to power in the 2012 election.

== Demographics ==
Historical population
Year	Pop.	±%
1901	46,647,804	—
1911	46,012,663	−1.4%
1921	44,556,427	−3.2%
1931	47,478,533	+6.6%
1941	53,920,630	+13.6%
1951	60,273,743	+11.8%
1961	70,143,635	+16.4%
1971	83,848,797	+19.5%
1981	105,136,540	+25.4%
1991	132,061,653	+25.6%
2001	166,197,921	+25.8%
2011	199,812,341	+20.2%
Source: Census of India

Uttar Pradesh has a very large population and a high population growth rate. From 1991 to 2001 its population increased by over 26 per cent. It is the most populous state in India, with 199,581,477 people in March 2011. The state contributes to 16.2 per cent of India's population. As of 2023, the estimated population of the state is around 235.7 million people. The population density is 828 people per square kilometre, making it one of the most densely populated states in the country. It has the largest scheduled caste population, making up 23 per cent of the state's population, whereas scheduled tribes are less than 1 per cent of the total population.

The sex ratio in 2011, at 912 women to 1,000 men, was lower than the national figure of 943. The low sex ratio in Uttar Pradesh is a result of various factors, such as sex-selective abortion, female infanticide, and discrimination against girls and women. The state's 2001–2011 decennial growth rate (including Uttrakhand) was 20.1 per cent, higher than the national rate of 17.64 per cent.

The 2011 literacy rate was 67.7 per cent, which was below the national average of 74 per cent. The literacy rate for men is 79 per cent and for women 59 per cent. The 2001 literacy rate was 56 per cent overall, 67 per cent for men and 43 per cent for women. A report based on a National Statistical Office (NSO) survey (Note: National Sample Survey from July 2017 to June 2018 provides state-wise details of literacy rates among persons aged seven and above.) revealed that Uttar Pradesh's literacy rate is 73 per cent, less than the national average of 77.7 per cent. According to the report, in the rural region, the literacy rate among men is 80.5 per cent and women is 60.4 per cent, while in urban areas, the literacy rate among men is 86.8 per cent and women is 74.9 per cent.

Economically, a large number of the population lives below the poverty line. As per a World Bank document released in 2016, the pace of poverty reduction in the state has been slower than the rest of the country. Estimates released by the Reserve Bank of India for the year 2011–12 revealed that the state had 59.819 million people below the poverty line, the most for any state in India. The central and eastern districts in particular have very high levels of poverty. The state is also experiencing widening consumption inequality. As per the report of the Ministry of Statistics and Programme Implementation released in 2020, the state per capita income is below ₹80,000 (US$830) per annum.

=== Religion ===
Religion in Uttar Pradesh (2011)
1. Hinduism (79.7%)
2. Islam (19.3%)
3. Sikhism (0.32%)
4. Other (Note: Including Jainism, Buddhism, and Christianity) (0.40%)
5. Not stated (0.29%)

Uttar Pradesh is home to the largest populations of both Hindus and Muslims in India, with the two communities comprising approximately 80 per cent and 19 per cent of the state's population, respectively. The state's Hindu population is estimated at 186 million, making it the largest Hindu population of any state in the country. Uttar Pradesh also has an estimated 44 million Muslims, a figure that exceeds the Muslim populations of several Muslim‑majority countries, including Saudi Arabia, Iraq, Malaysia, Syria, the United Arab Emirates, and Libya. Hinduism is the most widely practiced religion and is especially strong in rural areas. Islam is more prominent in urban areas and northwestern parts of the state. Moradabad and Rampur are the districts in which Muslims constitute an absolute majority, accounting for 50.80 per cent and 50.57 per cent of the population, respectively.

Uttar Pradesh has historically been an important centre of Buddhism and Jainism. According to Buddhism, Gautama Buddha delivered his first sermon at Sarnath after attaining enlightenment, making it one of the religion’s most significant pilgrimage sites. Other major Buddhist centres, including Kushinagar, where Buddha is believed to have attained Mahaparinirvana, are located in the state.

Many Jain Tirthankaras are believed to have been born in the state. According to Jain traditions and scriptures, Ajitanatha, the second Tirthankara, is closely associated with Ayodhya, which is also traditionally regarded as the birthplace of other Tirthankaras, including Abhinandananatha and Sumatinatha. Important Jain pilgrimage sites in the state includes Deogarh, Ahichchhatra (present-day Ramnagar). A sizeable population of Jains lives in urban areas in the northwest part of the state.

The Sikh history of Uttar Pradesh is closely linked to the travels of the Sikh Gurus and later post-Partition migrations. Guru Nanak traveled extensively through Uttar Pradesh during his first and third Udasis (spiritual journeys). Sikh Gurus visited and established sangats (congregations) in the state. Guru Nanak visited Mathura (Guru Nanak Bagichi) and Varanasi (Guru Bagh). Guru Hargobind sent representatives to Lucknow around 1580 to establish Sikh congregations. Sikhs, mainly descendants of refugees from Partition, are settled in Prayagraj, Sultanpur, Benaras and Jaunpur, and northern districts bordering Delhi .

=== Language ===
Languages of Uttar Pradesh from 2011 census
1. Hindi (80.2%)
2. Bhojpuri (10.9%)
3. Urdu (5.42%)
4. Awadhi (1.90%)
5. Others (Note: Including Punjabi, Bengali) (1.59%)

Uttar Pradesh is a linguistically diverse state where several Indo-Aryan languages and dialects are widely spoken. The primary official language is Hindi, used in government, education, and media, and it is also the most widely spoken language across the state. A significant portion of the population speaks various regional languages grouped under the Hindi. These include Awadhi, spoken in Awadh in central Uttar Pradesh; Bhojpuri spoken in Purvanchal in eastern Uttar Pradesh; and Braj Bhasha spoken in the Braj region in Western Uttar Pradesh.

These languages have been recognised by the state government for official use in their respective regions. Bhojpuri is the second most spoken language in the state, with nearly 11 per cent of the population using it. This is partly due to the high population density in eastern Uttar Pradesh, where Bhojpuri is commonly spoken, compared to the central and western regions of the state.

Urdu was granted the status of a second official language in 1989, through the Official Languages Act. It is spoken by approximately 5.4 per cent of the population. English is used as a means of communication for education, commerce, and governance. It is commonly spoken and employed as a language of instruction in educational institutions, as well as for conducting business transactions and managing administrative affairs. Other notable languages spoken in the state include Punjabi (0.3 per cent) and Bengali (0.1 per cent).

=== Human Development Index ===
In 2026, Uttar Pradesh’s Human Development Index (HDI), which is calculated on the basis of life expectancy, education, and per capita income, stands at approximately 0.600, placing the state in the medium human development category. While the state has shown consistent, steady improvements across health, education, and per capita income over the last decade, it continues to rank in the lower third among Indian states.

== Governance and administration ==
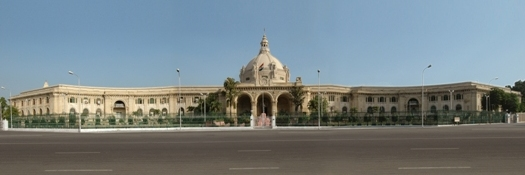
Uttar Pradesh Legislative Assembly (Vidhan Sabha), the lower house of the bicameral legislature

The state is governed by a parliamentary system of representative democracy. Uttar Pradesh is one of the seven states in India, where the state legislature is bicameral, comprising two houses: the Vidhan Sabha (Legislative Assembly) and the Vidhan Parishad (Legislative Council). The Legislative Assembly consists of 404 members who are elected for five-year terms. The Legislative Council is a permanent body of 100 members with one-third (33 members) retiring every two years. The state sends the largest number of legislators to the national Parliament. The state contributes 80 seats to Lok Sabha, the lower house of the Indian Parliament, and 31 seats to Rajya Sabha, the upper house.

The Government of Uttar Pradesh is a democratically elected body in India with the governor as its constitutional head and is appointed by the president of India for a five-year term. The leader of the party or coalition with a majority in the Legislative Assembly is appointed as the chief minister by the governor, and the council of ministers is appointed by the governor on the advice of the chief minister. The governor remains a ceremonial head of the state, while the chief minister and his council are responsible for day-to-day government functions. The Council of Ministers includes Cabinet Ministers and Ministers of State (MoS), with the latter sometimes holding independent charge of specific departments. The Secretariat headed by the Chief Secretary assists the council of ministers. The Chief Secretary is also the administrative head of the government. Each government department is headed by a minister, who is assisted by an Additional Chief Secretary or a Principal Secretary, who is usually an officer of Indian Administrative Service (IAS), the Additional Chief Secretary/Principal Secretary function as the administrative head of the department they are assigned to. Each department also has officers of the rank of Secretary, Special Secretary, Joint Secretary etc. assisting the Minister and the Additional Chief Secretary/Principal Secretary.

For administration, the state is divided into 18 divisions and 75 districts. Divisional Commissioner, an IAS officer is the head of revenue administration on the divisional level. The administration in each district is headed by a District Magistrate (DM), who is also an IAS officer, and is assisted by several officers belonging to state services. The District Magistrate, as the head of the district administration, is responsible for revenue administration, maintenance of law and order, disaster management, conducting elections, coordination among various departments, and delivery of public services in the district. At the block level, the Block Development Officer (BDO) is responsible for the overall development of the block. The Uttar Pradesh Police is headed by an IPS officer of the rank of Director general of police (DGP). A Superintendent of Police (SP), an IPS officer assisted by the officers of the Uttar Pradesh Police Service, is entrusted with the responsibility of maintaining law and order and related issues in each district. The Divisional Forest Officer (DFO), an officer belonging to the Indian Forest Service manages the forests, environment, and wildlife of the district, assisted by the officers of Provincial Forest Service and Uttar Pradesh Forest Subordinate Service.

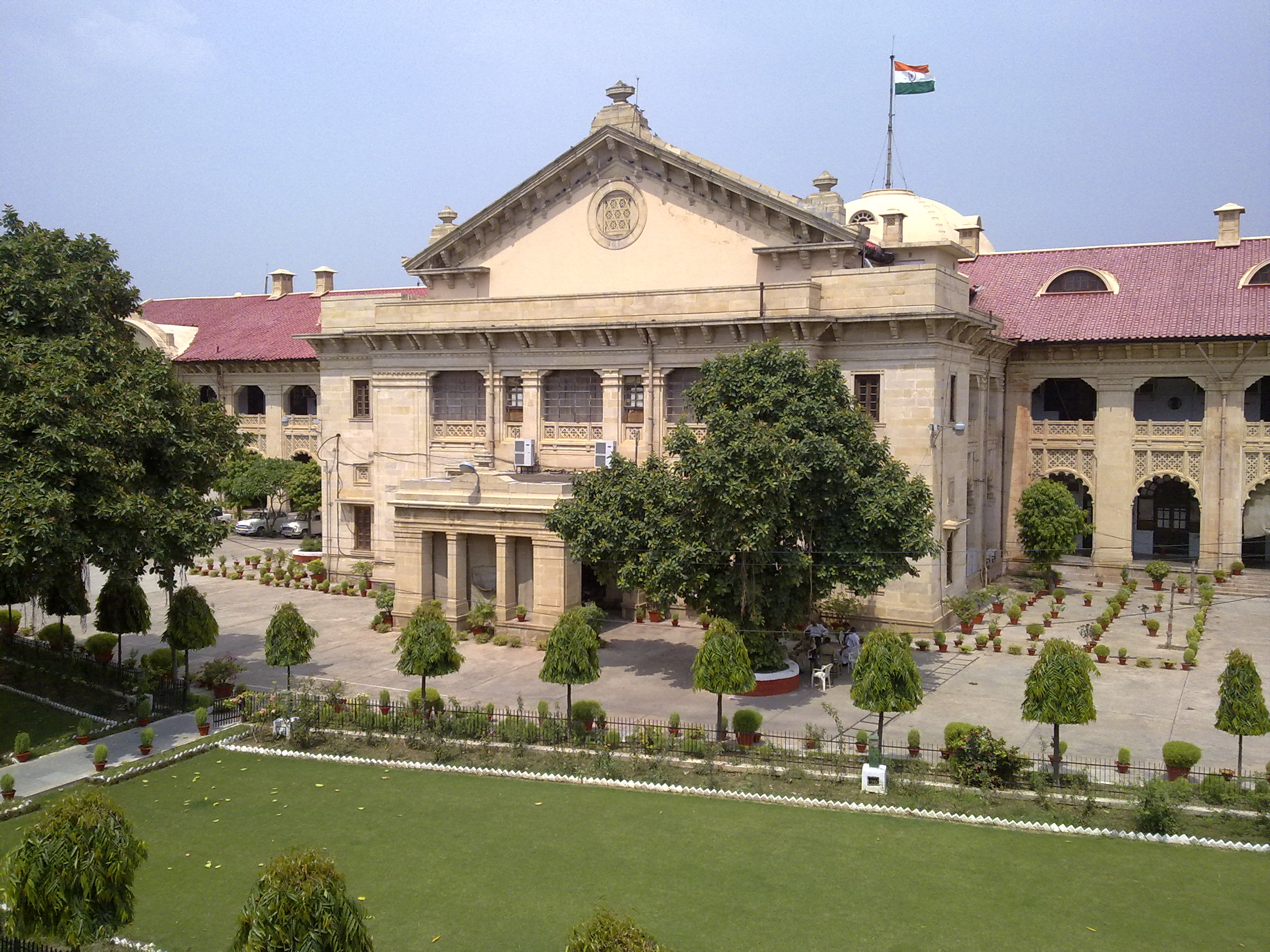
Allahabad High Court

The judiciary in the state consists of the Allahabad High Court in Prayagraj, the Lucknow Bench of Allahabad High Court, district courts and session courts in each district or Sessions Division, and lower courts at the tehsil level. The president of India appoints the chief justice of the High Court of the Uttar Pradesh judiciary on the advice of the Chief Justice of the Supreme Court of India as well as the governor of Uttar Pradesh. Subordinate Judicial Service, categorised into two divisions viz. Uttar Pradesh civil judicial services and Uttar Pradesh higher judicial service are another vital part of the judiciary of Uttar Pradesh. While the Uttar Pradesh civil judicial services comprise the Civil Judges (Junior Division)/Judicial Magistrates and civil judges (Senior Division)/Chief Judicial Magistrate, the Uttar Pradesh higher judicial service comprises civil and sessions judges. The Subordinate judicial service (viz. The district court of Etawah and the district court of Kanpur Dehat) of the judiciary at Uttar Pradesh is controlled by the District Judge.

Politics in Uttar Pradesh has been dominated by four political parties – the Samajwadi Party, the Bahujan Samaj Party, the Bharatiya Janata Party, and the Indian National Congress. The political landscape of the state is often characterised by intense competition and polarisation, leading to caste-based tensions and communal conflicts. Critics often suggest that although Uttar Pradesh has produced eight Prime Ministers, the state continues to struggle with issues that hinder its overall advancement.

=== Crime and accidents ===
According to the National Human Rights Commission of India (NHRC), Uttar Pradesh tops the list of states of encounter killings and custodial deaths. In 2014, the state recorded 365 judicial deaths out of a total 1,530 deaths recorded in the country. NHRC further said, of the over 30,000 murders registered in the country in 2016, Uttar Pradesh had 4,889 cases. A data from Minister of Home Affairs (MHA) avers, Bareilly recorded the highest number of custodial death at 25, followed by Agra (21), Allahabad (19) and Varanasi (9). National Crime Records Bureau (NCRB) data from 2011 says, the state has the highest number of crimes among any state in India, but due to its high population, the actual per capita crime rate is low. The state also continues to top the list of states with maximum communal violence incidents. An analysis of Ministers of State of Home Affairs states (2014), 23 per cent of all incidents of communal violence in India took place in the state. According to a research assembled by State Bank of India, Uttar Pradesh failed to improve its Human Development Index (HDI) ranking over a period of 27 years (1990–2017). Based on sub-national human development index data for Indian states from 1990 to 2017, the report also stated that the value of human development index has steadily increased over time from 0.39 in 1990 to 0.59 in 2017. The Uttar Pradesh Police, governed by the Department of Home and Confidential, is the largest police force in the world.

Uttar Pradesh also reported the highest number of deaths – 41,746 – due to road accidents till December 2022, according to "Road Accidents in India" report of Union Ministry of Road Transport and Highways. The UP Transport Department report also indicates that the primary cause of road accident fatalities was over-speeding, which accounted for 40 per cent of deaths. Drunken driving contributed to 10 per cent of fatalities, while 12 per cent of deaths were due to driving on the wrong side. Moreover, 10 per cent of accident deaths were caused by the use of mobile phones, and 5 per cent resulted from running red lights. The remaining 23 per cent of deaths were attributed to factors such as losing control of the vehicle, drowsiness, poor road visibility, and engineering defects.

Between 2006 and 2010, the state has been hit with three terrorist attacks, including explosions in a landmark holy place, a court and a temple. The 2006 Varanasi bombings were a series of bombings that occurred across the Hindu holy city of Varanasi on 7 March 2006. At least 28 people were killed and as many as 101 others were injured. In the afternoon of 23 November 2007, within a span of 25 minutes, six consecutive serial blasts occurred in the Lucknow, Varanasi, and Faizabad courts, in which 28 people were killed. Another blast occurred on 7 December 2010, the blast occurred at Sheetla Ghat in Varanasi in which more than 38 people were killed. In February 2016, a series of bomb blasts occurred at the Jhakarkati Bus Station in Kanpur, killing 2 people and injuring more than 30.

== Economy ==
Net state domestic product at factor cost at current prices (2011–12 base) figures in crores of Indian rupees
Year	Net state domestic product
2011–12	532,218
2015–16	1,137,808
2016–17	1,288,700
2017–18	1,446,000 (est.)

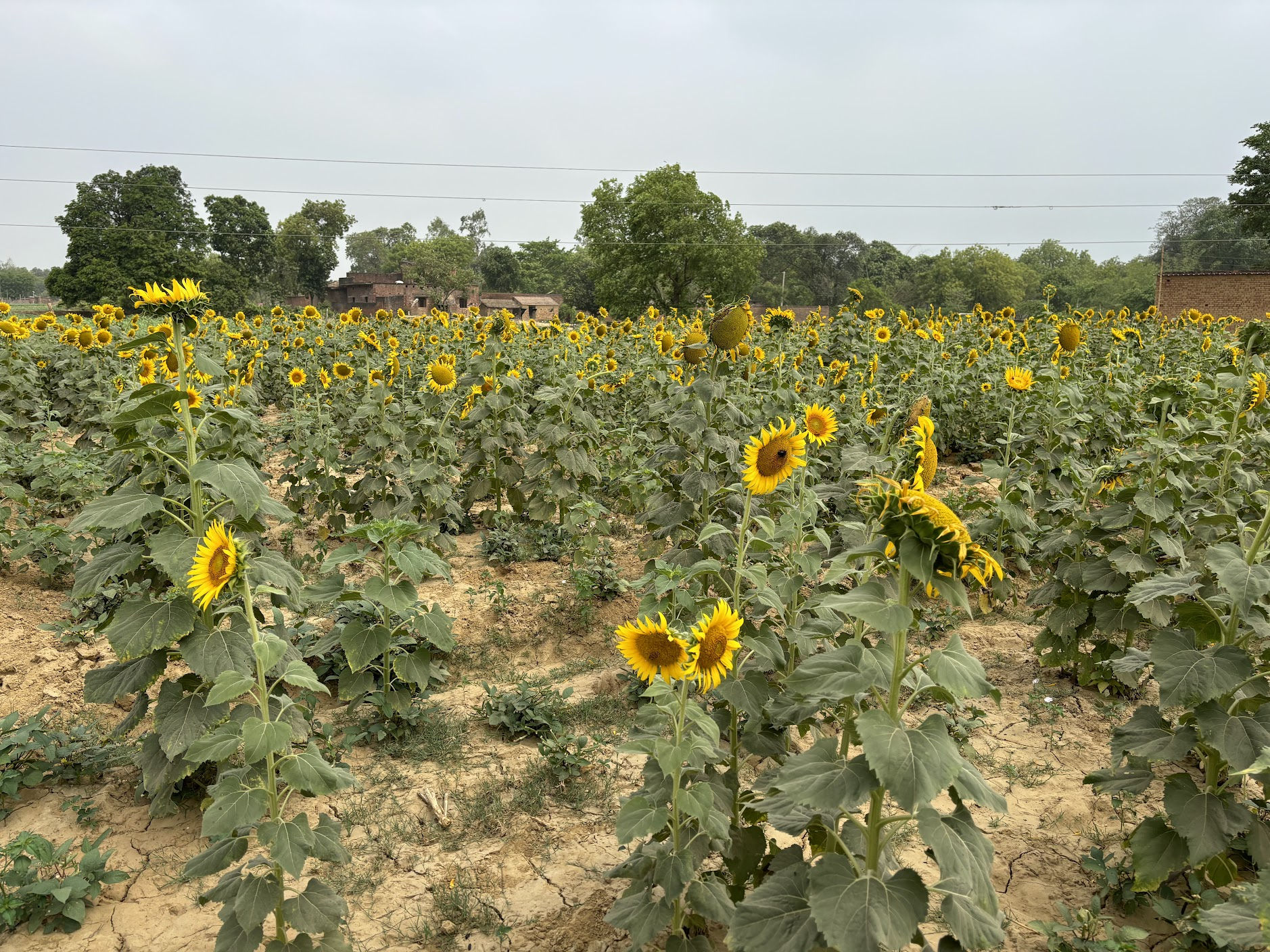
Sown saplings of common sunflowers; located in the rich fertile Indo-Gangetic Plain, agriculture is the largest employment generator in the state.

In terms of net state domestic product (NSDP), Uttar Pradesh is the fourth-largest economy in India, with an estimated gross state domestic product of ₹14.89 lakh crore (US$150 billion), contributing 8.4 per cent of India's gross domestic product. According to the report generated by India Brand Equity Foundation (IBEF), in 2014–15, Uttar Pradesh has accounted for 19 per cent share in the country's total food grain output. About 70 per cent of India's sugar comes from Uttar Pradesh. Sugarcane is the most important cash crop as the state is the country's largest producer of sugar. As per the report generated by Indian Sugar Mills Association (ISMA), total sugarcane production in India was estimated to be 28.3 million tonnes in the fiscal ending September 2015 which includes 10.47 million tonnes from Maharashtra and 7.35 million tonnes from Uttar Pradesh.

The state has significant reserves of cement-grade limestone and crystalline marble, in districts of Mirzapur and Sonbhadra, supporting a growing cement and refractory industry. With 359 manufacturing clusters, cement is the top sector of SMEs in Uttar Pradesh. The Uttar Pradesh Financial Corporation (UPFC) was established in 1954 under the SFCs Act of 1951 mainly to develop small- and medium-scale industries in the state. The UPFC also provides working capital to existing units with a soundtrack record and to new units under a single window scheme. In July 2012, due to financial constraints and directions from the state government, lending activities were suspended except for State Government Schemes. The state has reported total private investment worth over Rs. 25,081 crores during the years of 2012 and 2016.

According to the 2024 Ease of Doing Business ranking by the Commerce and Industry ministry, Uttar Pradesh ranked among the top 10 states in India and secured the highest position among all northern states. The state is home to over 11,500 leather production units, many of which are located in Agra and Kanpur, making it one of India's leading leather manufacturing regions. Uttar Pradesh also contributes around 15 per cent of India's total fabric production and employs nearly 30 per cent of the country's artisan workforce.

According to the Uttar Pradesh Budget Documents (2019–20), Uttar Pradesh's debt burden is 29.8 per cent of the GSDP. The state's total financial debt stood at ₹2.09 lakh crore (US$22 billion) in 2011. Uttar Pradesh has not been able to witness double-digit economic growth despite consistent attempts over the years. The GSDP is estimated to have grown 7 per cent in 2017–18 and 6.5 per cent in 2018–19 which is about 10 per cent of India's GDP. According to a survey conducted by the Centre for Monitoring Indian Economy (CMIE), Uttar Pradesh's unemployment rate increased 11.4 percentage points, rising to 21.5 per cent in April 2020. Uttar Pradesh has the largest number of net migrants migrating out of the state. The 2011 census data on migration shows that nearly 14.4 million (14.7 per cent) people had migrated out of Uttar Pradesh. Marriage was cited as the main reason for migration among females. Among males, the most important reason for migration was work and employment. Uttar Pradesh continues to have regional disparities, particularly with the western districts of the state showing higher development indicators such as per capita district development product (PCDDP) and gross district development product (GDDP) compared to other regions. Due to inadequate infrastructure and a dense population, Purvanchal faces notable socio-economic disparities. For 2021–22 the GDDP for Purvanchal it is ₹5.37 lakh crore, while for Western Uttar Pradesh (including the Upper Doab, Rohilkhand and Braj) it is ₹9.44 lakh crore. For the Bundelkhand and Awadh regions, the GDDP remained ₹99,029.34 crore and ₹3.36 lakh crore, respectively. As of 2021–22, the per capita annual income in eastern districts is about one-fourth of the national average at ₹12,741 while the state's average stood at ₹17,349.

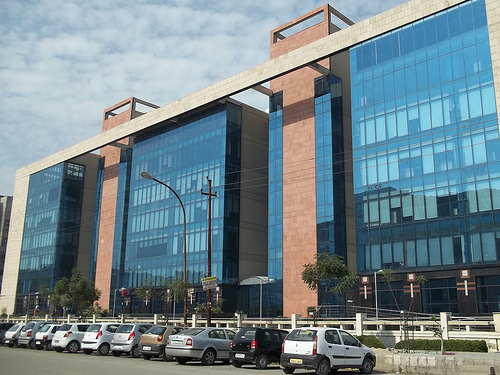
IT Parks in Noida, which are known for their infrastructure and services, as well as high-end housing complexes.

In 2009–10, the tertiary sector of the economy (service industries) was the largest contributor to the gross domestic product of the state, contributing 44.8 per cent of the state domestic product compared to 44 per cent from the primary sector (agriculture, forestry, and tourism) and 11.2 per cent from the secondary sector (industrial and manufacturing). Noida, Meerut, and Agra rank as the top 3 districts with the highest per capita income, whereas Lucknow and Kanpur rank 7th and 9th in per capita income. During the 11th five-year plan (2007–2012), the average gross state domestic product (GSDP) growth rate was 7.3 per cent, lower than 15.5 per cent, the average for all states of the country. The state's per capita GSDP was ₹29,417 (US$310), lower than the national per capita GSDP of ₹60,972 (US$630). Labor efficiency is higher at an index of 26 than the national average of 25. Textiles and sugar refining, both long-standing industries in Uttar Pradesh, employ a significant proportion of the state's total factory labour. The economy also benefits from the state's tourism industry.

== Transportation ==
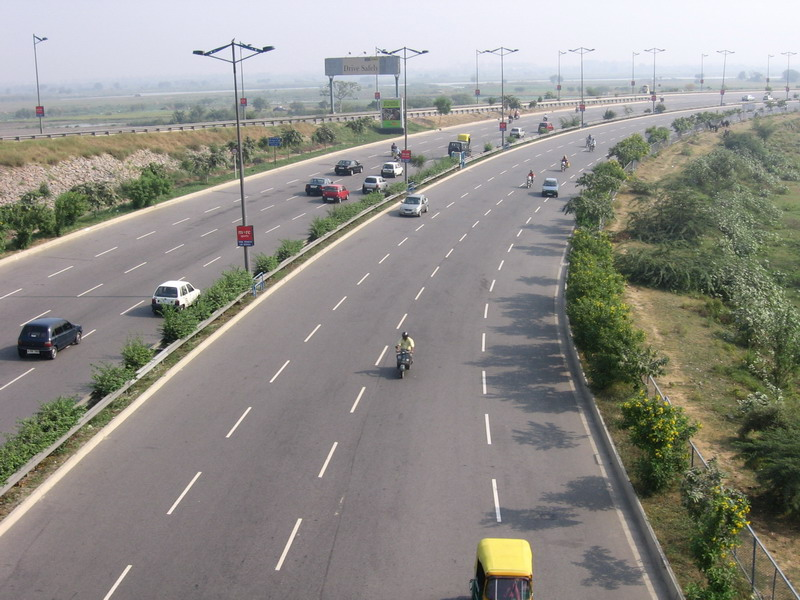
A section of the Delhi–Noida Direct Flyway

Uttar Pradesh has the largest railway network in the country, but in relative terms has only sixth-highest railway density given its plain topography and largest population. As of 2015, there were 9,077 km (5,640 mi) of rail in the state. The railway network in the state is controlled by two divisions of the Indian Railways viz. North Central Railway and North Eastern Railway. Prayagraj is the headquarters of the North Central Railway and Gorakhpur is the headquarters of the North Eastern Railway. Lucknow and Moradabad serve as divisional headquarters of the Northern Railway Division. The Lucknow Swarna Shatabdi Express, the second fastest Shatabdi Express train, connects the Indian capital of New Delhi to Lucknow while Kanpur Shatabdi Express, connects New Delhi to Kanpur Central. This was the first train in India to get the new German LHB coaches. The railway stations of Prayagraj Junction, Agra Cantonment, Lucknow Charbagh, Gorakhpur Junction, Kanpur Central, Mathura Junction and Varanasi Junction are included in the Indian Railways list of 50 world-class railway stations. The Lucknow Metro, along with the Kanpur Metro (Orange line), are rapid transit systems that serve Lucknow and Kanpur, respectively.

The state has a large, multimodal transportation system with the largest road network in the country. It has 42 national highways, with a total length of 4,942 km (3,071 miles) comprising 8.9 per cent of the total national highways length in India. The Uttar Pradesh State Road Transport Corporation (UPSRTC) was established in 1972 to provide transportation in the state with connecting services to adjoining states. The UPSRTC's fleet consists of 11,238 buses operating on 2,762 routes across a total distance of 768,065 km (477,253 mi) throughout the state, generating an average daily income of ₹16 crore (equivalent to ₹17 crore or US$1.8 million in 2026). Many of UPSRTC buses are now outdated and unreliable, raising concerns about their condition and the impact on passenger safety. All cities are connected to state highways, and all district headquarters are being connected with four lane roads which carry traffic between major centres within the state. One of them is Agra–Lucknow Expressway, which is a 302 km (188 miles) controlled-access highway constructed by UPEIDA. Uttar Pradesh has the highest road density in India – 1,027 km (638 miles) per 1,000 km^{2} (390 square miles) – and the largest surfaced urban-road network in the country – 50,721 km (31,517 miles).

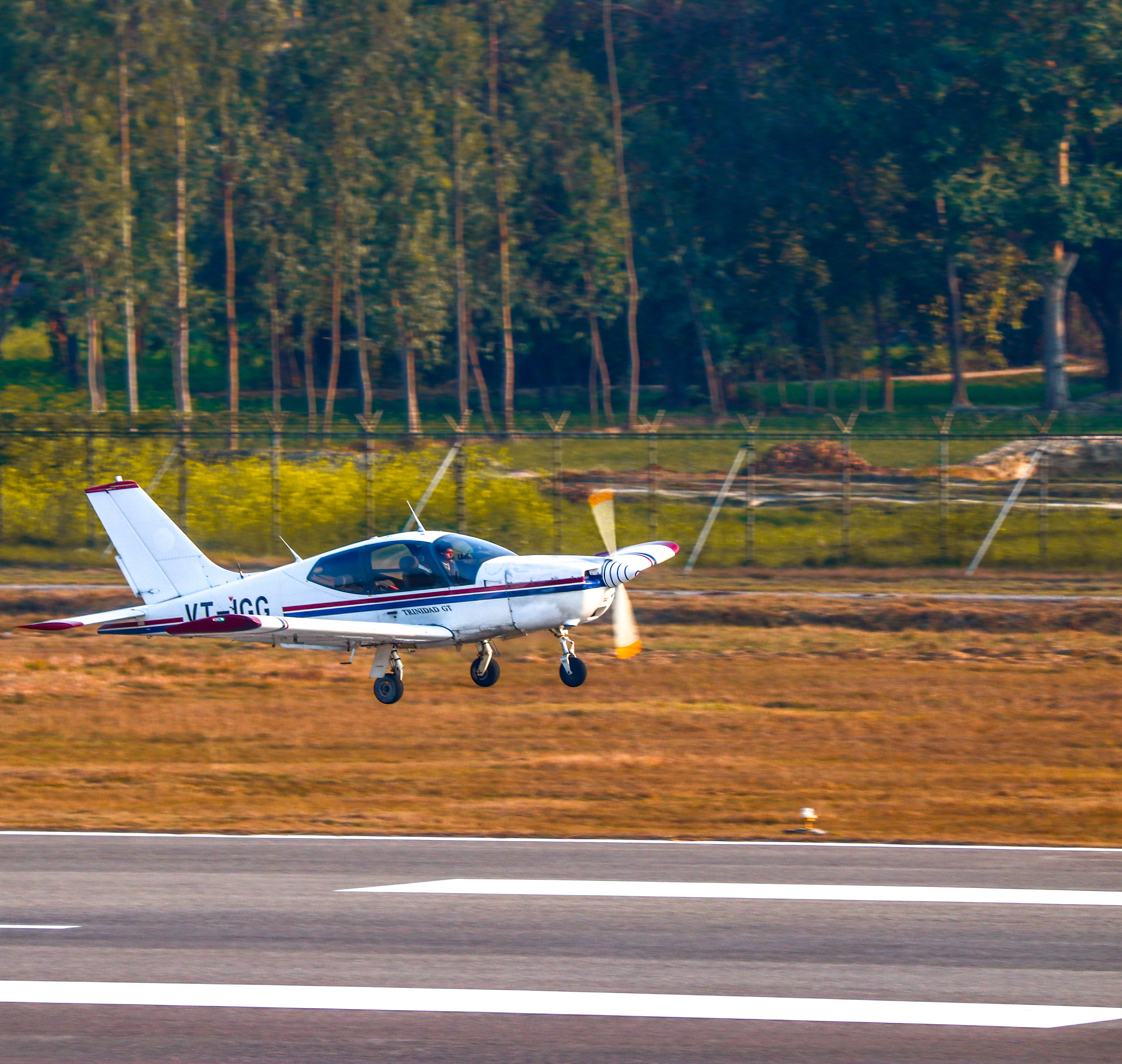
IGRUA's Trinidad TB-20 aircraft taking off

By passenger traffic in India, Chaudhary Charan Singh International Airport in Lucknow and Lal Bahadur Shastri Airport in Varanasi, are the major international airports and the main gateway to the state. Another international airport has been built at Kushinagar. However, since its inauguration, Kushinagar International Airport has not yet seen any outbound flights to international destinations. Ayodhya Airport, officially known as Maharshi Valmiki International Airport, was inaugurated on 30 December 2023 and currently facilitates domestic air travel. The newly constructed Noida International Airport commenced commercial operations in 2026, becoming the second major airport serving the Delhi National Capital Region.

Uttar Pradesh has six domestic airports located at Agra, Allahabad, Bareilly, Ghaziabad, Gorakhpur and Kanpur. Under the collaboration with civilian aviation authority, these domestic airports are also used by the Indian Air Force for operational flexibility, especially during emergencies or natural disasters. Developed under Regional Connectivity Scheme (UDAN), Chitrakoot Airport is the first and only airport in the Bundelkhand region. Although inaugurated in 2024, the airport has remained largely inactive due to low passenger traffic, and flight operations were suspended in December 2024 owing to poor visibility and operational challenges. Similarly, the airports in Azamgarh, Aligarh, Moradabad, Shravasti, and Saharanpur have faced temporary closures due to limited commercial viability, low passenger traffic, and a shortage of suitable aircraft. Indira Gandhi Rashtriya Uran Akademi (IGRUA) is a premier pilot training institute located in Amethi. Established in 1985 under the Ministry of Civil Aviation, IGRUA provides commercial pilot training programs.

== Sports ==
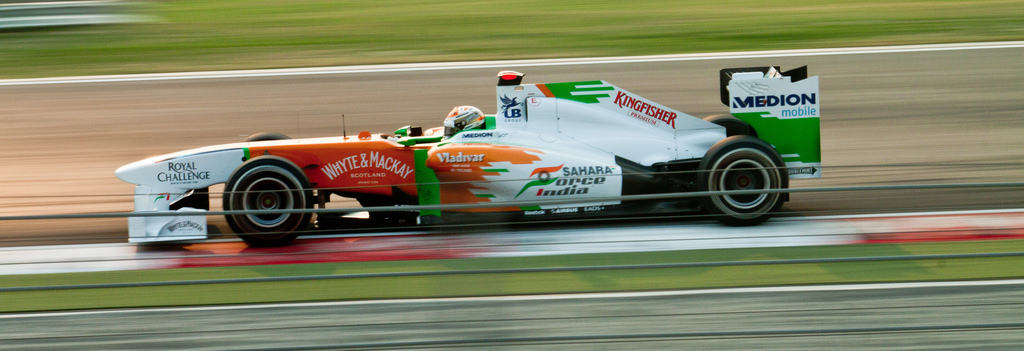
Force India racing at Buddh International Circuit

Traditional sports, now played mostly as a pastime, include wrestling, swimming, kabaddi, and track-sports or water-sports played according to local traditional rules and without modern equipment. Some sports are designed to display martial skills such as using a sword or 'Pata' (stick). Due to a lack of organised patronage and requisite facilities, these sports survive mostly as individuals' hobbies or local competitive events. Among modern sports, field hockey is popular and Uttar Pradesh has produced top-level players in India, such as Nitin Kumar. and Lalit Kumar Upadhyay.

Recently, cricket has become more popular than field hockey. Uttar Pradesh won its first Ranji Trophy tournament in February 2006, beating Bengal in the final. Shaheed Vijay Singh Pathik Sports Complex is a newly built international cricket stadium with a capacity of around 20,000 spectators. Wrestling has deep roots in Uttar Pradesh, with many akharas (traditional wrestling schools) spread across the state.

The Uttar Pradesh football team (UPFS) is the governing body for football in Uttar Pradesh. It holds authority over the Uttar Pradesh football team and is officially affiliated with the All India Football Federation. The UPFS participates in sending state teams to compete in all National Football Championships organised by the All India Football Federation. Moreover, the UPFS oversees two Mandal Football Associations: the Aligarh Football Association and the Kanpur Football Association. The Uttar Pradesh Badminton Association is a sports body affiliated to Badminton Association of India responsible for overseeing players representing Uttar Pradesh at the national level.

The Buddh International Circuit hosted India's inaugural F1 Grand Prix race on 30 October 2011. Races were only held three times before being cancelled due to falling attendance and lack of government support. The government of Uttar Pradesh considered Formula One to be entertainment and not a sport, and thus imposed taxes on the event and participants.

== Education ==
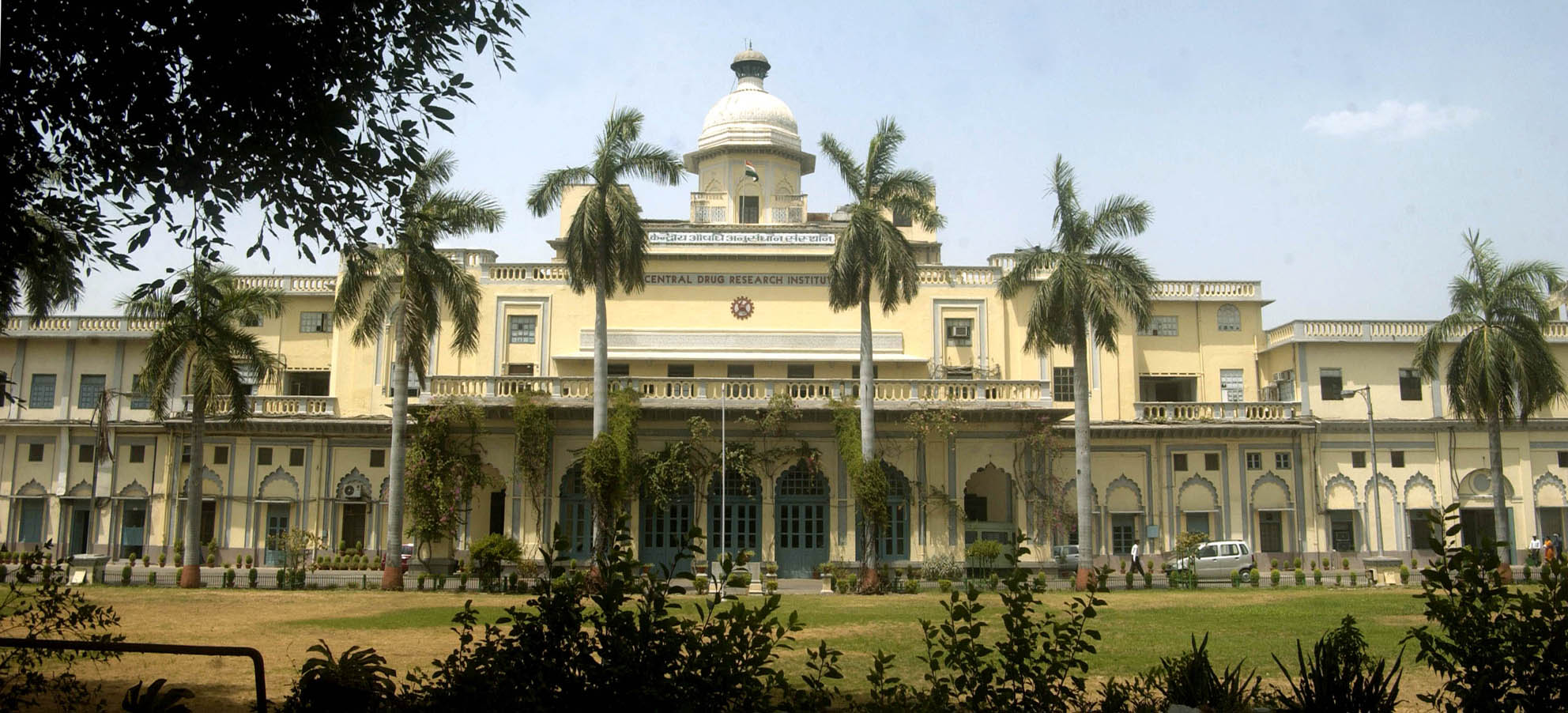
The Central Drug Research Institute, an autonomous multidisciplinary research institute

Uttar Pradesh has a prolonged tradition of education, although historically it was generally confined to the elite class and religious schools. Sanskrit-based learning formed the major part of education from the Vedic to the Gupta periods. As cultures travelled through the region they brought their bodies of knowledge with them, adding Pali, Persian and Arabic scholarship to the community. These formed the basis of Hindu-Buddhist-Muslim education until the rise of British colonialism. The present schools-to-university system of education owes its inception and development in the state (as in the rest of the country) to foreign Christian missionaries and the British colonial administration.

Schools in the state are either managed by the government or by private trusts. Hindi is used as a medium of instruction in most of the schools except those affiliated to the CBSE or the council for ICSE boards. Under the 10+2+3 plan, after completing secondary school, students typically enroll for two years in a junior college, also known as pre-university, or in schools with a higher secondary facility affiliated with the Uttar Pradesh Board of High School and Intermediate Education (commonly referred to as U.P. Board) or a central board. Students choose from one of three streams, namely liberal arts, commerce, or science. Upon completing the required coursework, students may enrol in general or professional degree programs. In a study done by Child Rights and You (CRY) and the Centre for Budgets, Governance, and Accountability (CBGA), Uttar Pradesh spent ₹9,167 per pupil, which is below the national average of ₹12,768.

The pupil/teacher ratio is 39:1, (Note: One teacher for every 39 students) lower than the national average of 23:1. According to the National Bureau of Economic Research, the state reported the second-highest teacher absenteeism (31%) in rural public schools among 19 surveyed states. According to an answer given by the Union Education Minister in 2020 in the Lok Sabha, about 17.1 per cent of all elementary teacher posts in government schools in Uttar Pradesh are vacant. In terms of absolute numbers, the figure stands at 210,000. In February 2024, the Uttar Pradesh government informed legislative assembly that, 85,152 posts of headmasters and assistant teachers are vacant in the state. According to data presented by the Union Ministry of Education in Parliament, the number of government schools in Uttar Pradesh decreased by approximately 26,000 between the 2017–18 and 2023–24 academic years. The state also recorded closures of educational institutions at the school and higher education levels. All India Council for Technical Education (AICTE) data showed that 12 engineering colleges in Uttar Pradesh closed during the 2025–26 academic year, the highest number among the states, alongside Maharashtra.

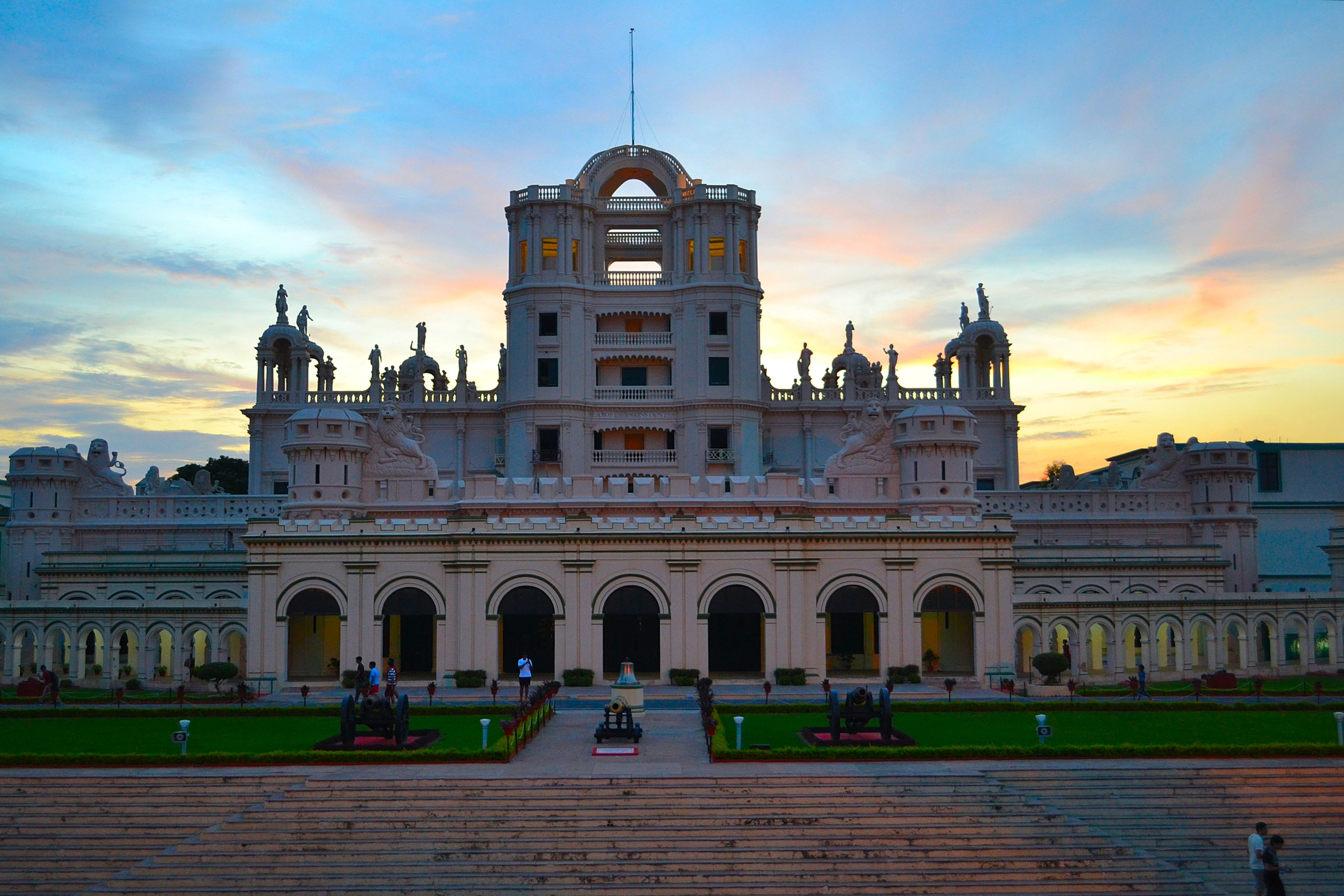
La Martiniere college, Lucknow

Uttar Pradesh has more than 45 universities, including six central universities, twenty eight state universities, eight deemed universities, two IITs in Varanasi and Kanpur, AIIMS Gorakhpur and AIIMS Rae Bareli, an IIM in Lucknow Founded in 1845, La Martinière Girls' College in Lucknow, ranks among the oldest schools in India. Located in Amethi, Rajiv Gandhi Institute of Petroleum Technology (RGIPT), provides education and training in STEM fields, particularly emphasising the petroleum industry. With deemed university status, the RGIPT awards degrees in its own right. King George's Medical University (KGMU), located in Lucknow, is an institution for medical education, research, and healthcare services. The Integral University, a state level institution, was established by the Uttar Pradesh Government to provide education in different technical, applied science, and other disciplines. The Central Institute of Higher Tibetan Studies was founded as an autonomous organisation by the national ministry of culture. Jagadguru Rambhadracharya Handicapped University is the only university established exclusively for the disabled in the world.

As of 2023, the state has 573 public libraries. Established in 1875, Maulana Azad Library is one of the oldest and is the largest university library in Asia. Rampur Raza Library is a repository of Indo-Islamic cultural heritage established in the last decades of the 18th century. It was established in 1774 by nawab Faizullah Khan and now an autonomous body under the Ministry of Culture. Thornhill Mayne Memorial also known as Allahabad Public Library, has an approximate collection of 125,000 books, 40 types of magazines, and 28 different newspapers in Hindi, English, Urdu and Bangla and it also contains 21 Arabic manuscripts. A large number of Indian scholars are educated at different universities in Uttar Pradesh. Notable scholars who were born, worked or studied in the geographic area of the state include Harivansh Rai Bachchan, Motilal Nehru, Harish Chandra and Indira Gandhi.

== Tourism ==
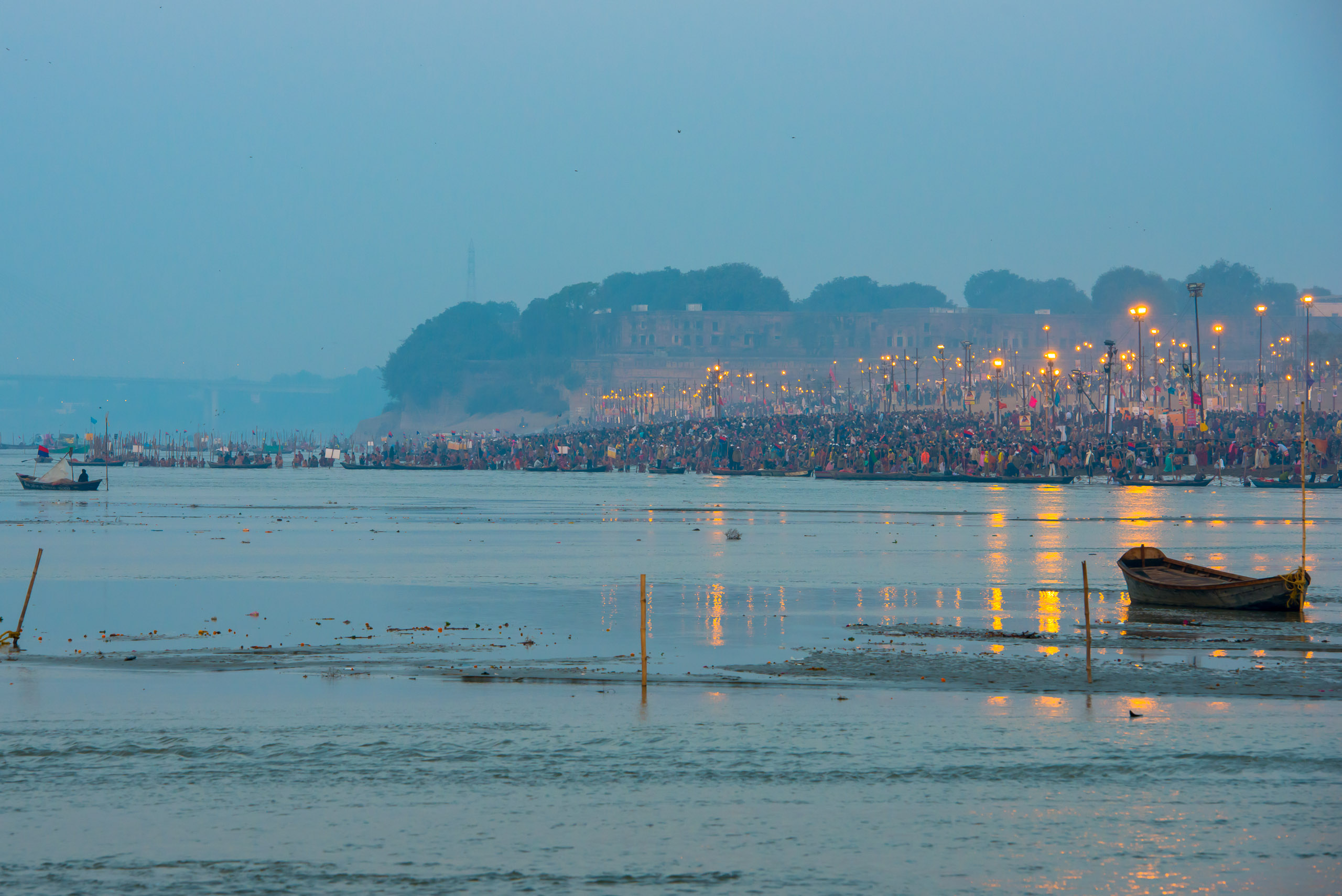
Kumbh Mela at Sangam, Allahabad, 2013

Uttar Pradesh ranks first in domestic tourist arrivals among all states of India. According to the Ministry of Tourism (Government of India), 1.6 million foreign tourists and approximately 317.91 million domestic tourists visited the state in 2023. The Taj Mahal attracts some 7 million people a year, earning almost ₹98 crore (US$10 million) in ticket sales in 2023–24. The state is home to three World Heritage Sites: the Taj Mahal, Agra Fort, and the nearby Fatehpur Sikri.

Religious tourism is the major contributor to the state's economy. Varanasi is a major religious hub and one of the seven sacred cities (Sapta Puri) in Hinduism and Jainism. Vrindavan is considered to be a holy place for Vaishnavism. Sravasti generally considered as revered sites in Buddhism, believed to be where the Buddha taught many of his Suttas (sermons). Owing to the belief as to the birthplace of Rama, Ayodhya (Awadh) has been regarded as one of the seven most important pilgrimage sites. Millions gather at Prayagraj to take part in the Magh Mela festival on the banks of the Ganges. This festival is organised on a larger scale every 12th year and is called the Kumbh Mela, where over 10 million Hindu pilgrims congregate in one of the largest gatherings of people in the world.

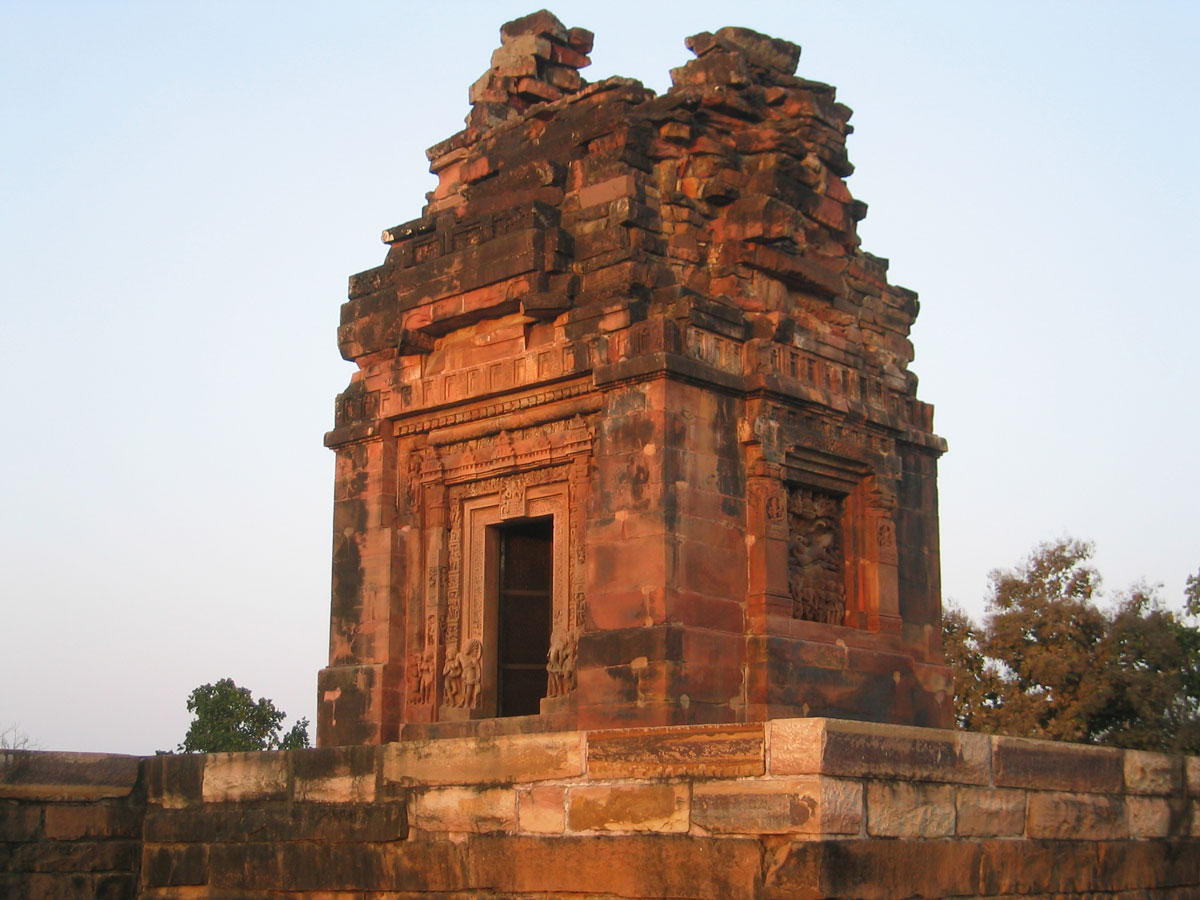
Deogarh temple is an early example of Nagara-style Hindu architecture

Buddhist attractions in Uttar Pradesh include stupas and monasteries. The historically important towns of Sarnath where Gautama Buddha gave his first sermon after his enlightenment and died at Kushinagar; both of which are important pilgrimage sites for Buddhists. Also at Sarnath are the Pillars of Ashoka and the Lion Capital of Ashoka, both important archaeological artefacts with national significance. At a distance of 80 km (50 miles) from Varanasi, Ghazipur is famous for its Ghats on the Ganges and for the tomb of Lord Cornwallis, the 18th-century Governor of East India Company ruled Bengal Presidency. The tomb is maintained by the Archaeological Survey of India.

Jhansi Fort, located in the city of Jhansi, is closely associated with the "First War of Indian Independence", also known as the "Great Rebellion" or the Indian Rebellion of 1857. The fort is constructed in accordance with medieval Indian military architecture, with thick walls, bastions, and various structures within its complex. The architecture incorporates elements of Hindu and Islamic styles.

== Healthcare ==
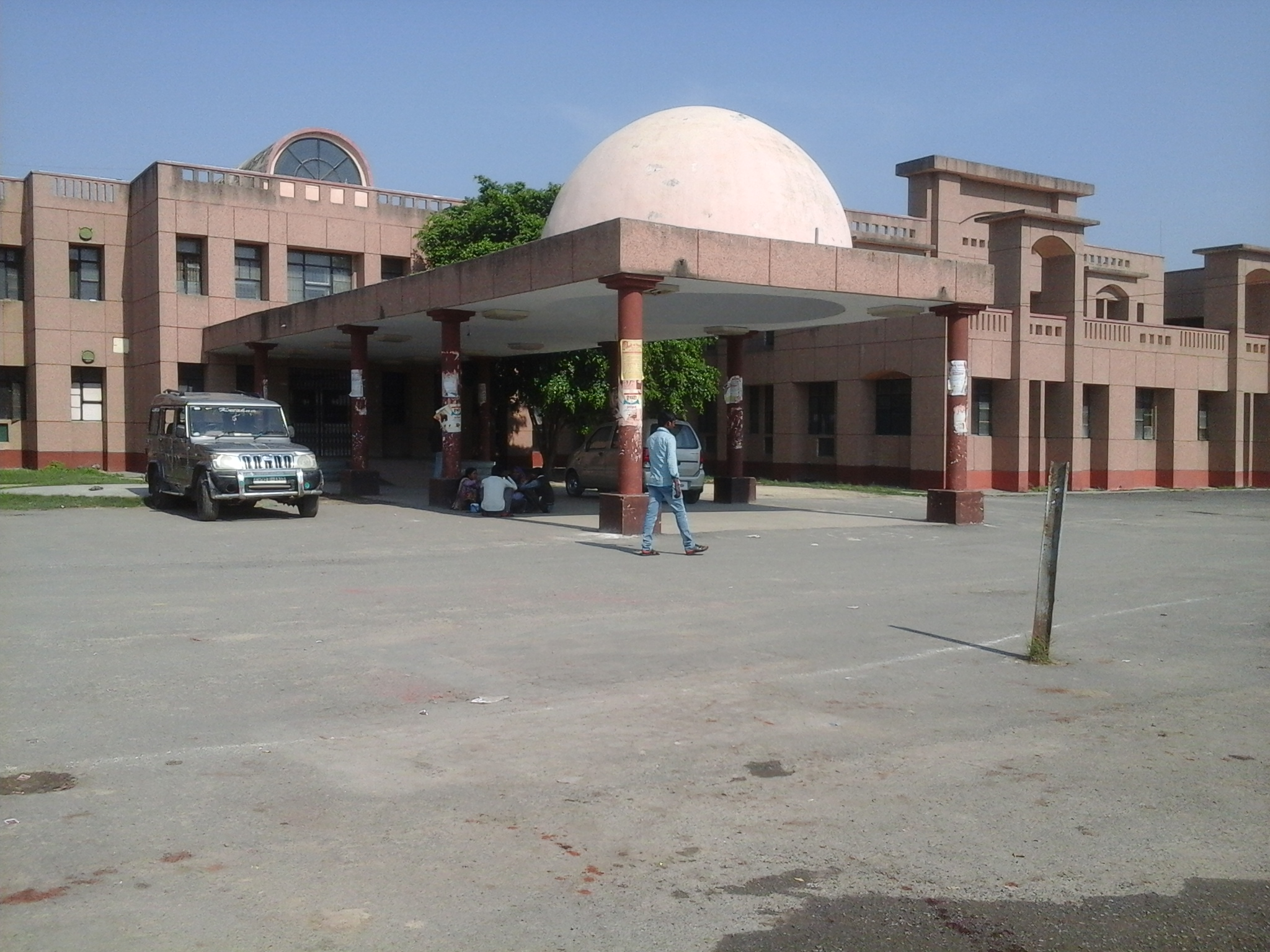
District Hospital, Kanpur Dehat

Uttar Pradesh has a mix of public as well as private healthcare infrastructure. Public healthcare in Uttar Pradesh is provided through a grid of primary health centres, community health centres, district hospitals, and medical colleges. Although an extensive network of public and private sector healthcare providers has been built, the available health infrastructure is inadequate to meet the demand for health services in the state. In 15 years to 2012–13, the population increased by more than 25 per cent. The public health centres, which are the frontline of the government's health care system, decreased by 8 per cent.

Smaller sub-centres, the first point of public contact, increased by no more than 2 per cent over the 25 years to 2015, a period when the population grew by more than 51 per cent. The state is also facing challenges such as a shortage of healthcare professionals, increasing cost of healthcare, a lack of essential medicines and equipment, the mushrooming of private healthcare and a lack of planning. The number of doctors registered with State Medical Councils or the Medical Council of India in Uttar Pradesh was 77,549.

According to the Ministry of Health and Family Welfare's Health Dynamics of India 2022–23 report, Uttar Pradesh had 3,055 rural Primary Health Centres (PHCs), 598 urban PHCs, 939 rural Community Health Centres (CHCs), 11 urban CHCs, and 125 district hospitals. These public health facilities, along with medical colleges, had a combined bed capacity of 77,243, comprising 13,548 beds in PHCs, 26,157 beds in CHCs, 22,812 beds in district hospitals, and 14,726 beds in medical colleges. The average population served per government hospital stands at 47,782 individuals. As of December 2023, Out-of-pocket expenditures in Uttar Pradesh is ₹60,883 crore (US$6.3 billion), highest in India.

A newborn in Uttar Pradesh is expected to live four years fewer than in the neighbouring state of Bihar, five years fewer than in Haryana and seven years fewer than in Himachal Pradesh. The state contributed to the largest share of almost all communicable and noncommunicable disease deaths, including 48 per cent of all typhoid deaths (2014); 17 per cent of cancer deaths and 18 per cent of tuberculosis deaths (2015). Its maternal mortality ratio is higher than the national average at 285 maternal deaths for every 100,000 live births (2021), with 64.2 per cent of pregnant women unable to access minimum ante-natal care. Around 42 per cent of pregnant women, more than 1.5 million, deliver babies at home. About two-thirds (61 per cent) of childbirths at home in the state are unsafe. It has the highest child mortality indicators, from the neonatal mortality rate to the under-five mortality rate of 64 children who die per 1,000 live births before five years of age, 35 die within a month of birth, and 50 do not complete a year of life.

== Culture ==
=== Language and literature ===
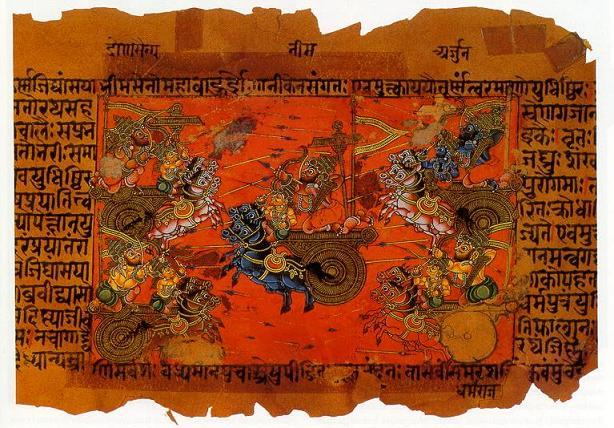
The battle of Kurukshetra, folio from the Mahabharata

Several texts and hymns of the Vedic literature were composed in Uttar Pradesh. Notable Indian writers who have resided in Uttar Pradesh were Kabir, Ravidas, and Tulsidas, who wrote much of his Ram Charit Manas in Varanasi. The festival of Guru Purnima is dedicated to Sage Vyasa, and also known as Vyasa Purnima as it is the day which is believed to be his birthday and also the day he divided the Vedas.

Hindi became the language of state administration with the Uttar Pradesh Official Language Act of 1951. A 1989 amendment to the act added Urdu, as an additional language of the state. There are numerous language varieties spoken in the state. The north and northwestern parts of the state speak Khadi Boli, the language variety from which Standard Hindi and Urdu developed. In the southwest is spoken Braj Bhasha, seen as the language of Krishna and an important literary language for Krishna Bhakti literature. To the east of Braj and Khadi Boli is Kannauji, a transitional dialect between western and eastern Hindi varieties.

In the southwest of the state, south of the Yamuna, is spoken Bundeli. Awadhi, the language of the Ram Charit Manas, is spoken in the centre of the state with small pockets of Bagheli speakers in the far southeast. East of Awadhi is spoken Bhojpuri. Rather than having clean linguistic boundaries, these language varieties form part of one large dialect continuum covering north and east India, Pakistan and Bangladesh. In urban areas, Standard Hindi and Urdu are dominant, with Lucknow being a major centre for Urdu literature.

=== Music and dance ===
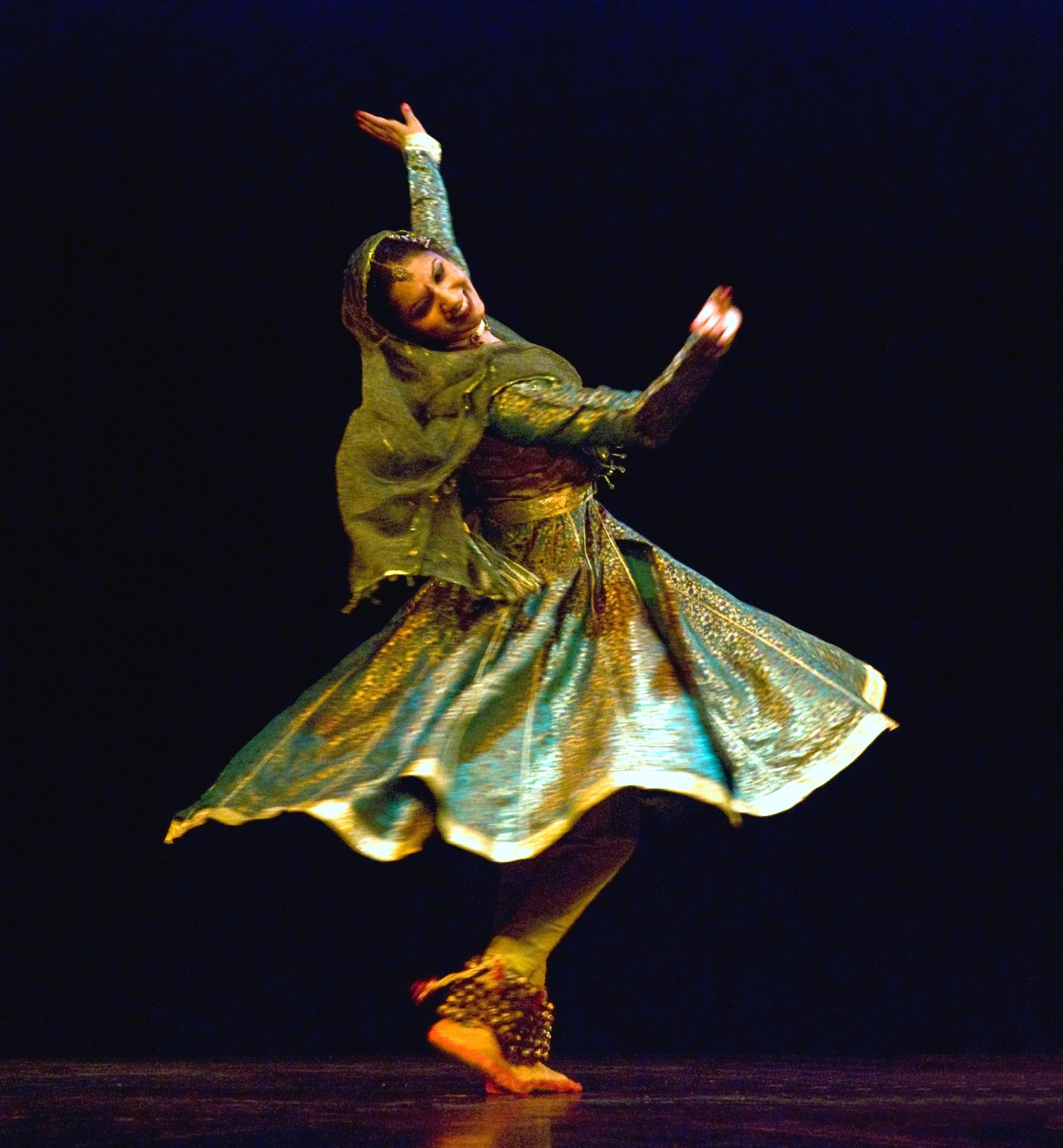
Richa Jain performing Chakkarwala tukra, a Kathak rhythmic composition featuring rapid spins (chakkars)

With each district of Uttar Pradesh having its unique music and tradition, traditional folk music in Uttar Pradesh has been categorised in three different ways including music transmitted orally, music with unknown composers and music performed by custom. During the medieval period, two distinct types of music developed in Uttar Pradesh. One was the courtly music, which received support from cities like Agra, Fatehpur Sikri, Lucknow, Jaunpur, Varanasi, and Banda. The other was the religious music stemming from the Bhakti Cult, which thrived in places like Mathura, Vrindavan, and Ayodhya.

The popular folk music of Uttar Pradesh includes sohar, which is sung to celebrate the birth of a child. Evolved into the form of semi-classical singing, Kajari sung during the rainy season, and its singing style is closely associated the Benares gharana. Ghazal, Thumri and Qawwali which is a form of Sufi poetry is popular in the Awadh region, Rasiya (especially popular in Braj), which celebrate the divine love of Radha and Krishna. Khayal is a form of semi-classical singing which comes from the courts of Awadh. Other forms of music are Biraha, Chaiti, Chowtal, Alha, and Sawani.

Kathak, a classical dance form, owes its origin to the state of Uttar Pradesh. Ramlila is one of the oldest dramatic folk dances; it depicts the life of the Hindu deity Rama and is performed during festivals such as Vijayadashami. Nautanki is a traditional form of folk theatre that originated in Uttar Pradesh. It typically portrays a variety of themes ranging from historical and mythological tales to social and political commentary. In the gharana dance form, both the Lucknow and the Benares gharanas are situated in the state. Charkula is popular dance of the Braj region.

=== Fairs and festivals ===
Chhath Puja is the biggest festival of eastern Uttar Pradesh. The Kumbh Mela, organised in the month of Maagha (February—March), is a major festival held every twelve years in rotation at Prayagraj on the river Ganges. Lathmar Holi is a local celebration of the Hindu festival of Holi. It takes place well before the actual Holi in the town of Barsana near Mathura. Taj Mahotsav, held annually at Agra, is a colourful display of the culture of the Braj area. Ganga Mahotsav, a festival of Kartik Purnima, is celebrated fifteen days after Diwali.

=== Cuisine ===
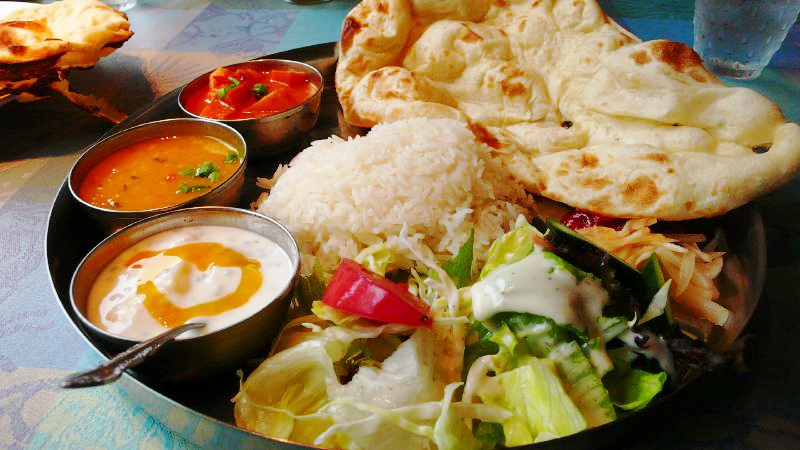
Uttar Pradeshi thali with naan, sultani dal, raita, and shahi paneer

Mughlai cuisine is a style of cooking developed in the Indian subcontinent by the imperial kitchens of the Mughal Empire. It represents the cooking styles used in North India, especially Uttar Pradesh, and has been strongly influenced by Central Asian cuisine. Awadhi cuisine from the city of Lucknow consists of both vegetarian and non-vegetarian dishes. It has been greatly influenced by Mughlai cuisine. Gulgula, a traditional sweet made from jaggery and wheat flour, is a popular dish in Awadh.

Bhojpuri cuisine is a style of food preparation common in the districts located near the Bihar border. Bhojpuri foods are mostly mild and tend to be less hot in terms of spices used. The cuisine consists of both vegetable and meat dishes.

== See also ==
- List of people from Uttar Pradesh
- Outline of India
- UP Gaurav Samman
