= Net national product =

Gross national product minus depreciation of fixed capital

Net national product (NNP) is gross national product (GNP), i.e. the total market value of all final goods and services produced by the factors of production of a country or other polity during a given time period, minus depreciation. Similarly, net domestic product (NDP) is gross domestic product (GDP) minus depreciation. Depreciation describes the devaluation of fixed capital through wear and tear associated with its use in productive activities.

Closely related to the concept of GNP is another concept called NNP of a country. NNP is a more accurate measure of total value of goods and services by a country. It is derived from GNP figures. As a rough estimate, GNP is very useful indicator of total production of a country. But if we are interested to have an accurate and true measure of what a country is producing and what is available for uses, then GNP has a serious defect.

In national accounting, net national product (NNP) and net domestic product (NDP) are given by the two following formulas:

$$\text{NNP} = \text{GNP} - \text{Depreciation}$$

$$\text{NDP} = \text{GDP} - \text{Depreciation}$$

== Use in economics ==
Although the net national product is a key identity in national accounting, its use in economics research is generally superseded by the use of the gross domestic or national product as a measure of national income, a preference which has been historically a contentious topic (see e.g. Boulding (1948) and Burk (1948)). Nonetheless, the net national product has been the subject of research on its role as a dynamic welfare indicator as well as a means of reconciling forward and backward views on capital wherein NNP(t) corresponds to the interest on accumulated capital. Furthermore, the net national product has featured prominently as a measure in environmental economics such as within models accounting for the depletion of natural and environmental resources or as an indicator of sustainability.

== See also ==
- Genuine progress indicator (GPI)
- Hartwick's rule
- Net domestic product
- Value added
- Value product
