= Net domestic product =

Macroeconomic indicator

The net domestic product (NDP) equals the gross domestic product (GDP) minus depreciation on a country's capital goods.

$GDP - D = NDP$

Net domestic product accounts for capital that has been consumed over the year in the form of housing, vehicle, or machinery deterioration. The depreciation accounted for is often referred to as "capital consumption allowance" and represents the amount of capital that would be needed to replace those depreciated assets. The portion of investment spending that is used to replace worn out and obsolete equipment — depreciation — while essential for maintaining the level of output, does not increase the economy’s capacities in any way. If GDP were to grow simply as a result of the fact that more money was being spent to maintain the capital stock because of increased depreciation, it would not mean that anyone had been made better off. Because of this some economists view NDP as a better measure of social and economic well being than GDP.

If the country is not able to replace the capital stock lost through depreciation, then GDP will fall. In addition, a growing gap between GDP and NDP indicates increasing obsolescence of capital goods, while a narrowing gap means that the condition of capital stock in the country is improving. It reduces the value of capital that is why it is separated from GDP to get NDP.

== See also ==
- Gross domestic product
- National income accounting
- Net national product
