= List of airports in Uttar Pradesh =

This includes a list of airports in Uttar Pradesh. The list includes domestic, training and international airports.

== Contents ==
This list contains the following information:

1. Area served – Town or city where the airport is located. This may not always be an exact location as some airports are situated in the periphery of the town/city they serve.
2. ICAO – The four letter airport code assigned by the International Civil Aviation Organization. ICAO codes for India start with VA [West Zone - Mumbai Center], VE [East Zone - Kolkata Center], VI [North Zone - Delhi Center] and VO [South Zone - Chennai Center].
3. IATA – The three letter airport code assigned by the International Air Transport Association
4. Airport type – Type of airport, including the terminology used by Airports Authority of India, as per the first table below
5. Airport functional status – Functional status of the airport as per the second table below

Airport type	Description
International	Airport which handles both international and domestic traffic
International (CE)	A civil enclave airport primarily used by Indian Armed Forces but has separate commercial terminal(s) to handle international and domestic traffic
Customs	Airport with customs checking and clearance facility and handles domestic traffic throughout the year. A very limited number of international flights also operate from some of these customs airports for a limited period of time.
Domestic	Airport which handles only domestic traffic
Domestic (CE)	A civil enclave airport primarily used by Indian Armed Forces but has separate commercial terminal(s) to handle domestic traffic
Defence	An airfield under the control of Indian Armed Forces where commercial and private flights do not operate. The ones listed here are apart from Air Force stations, Naval air stations & Air Force training facilities.
Private	An airport, airfield or airstrip owned by individuals, trusts and corporations and are for private use only
Flying school	An airfield or an airstrip used to train commercial pilots

Airport functional status	Description
Operational	Implies airport has active commercial service for public use airports
Non-operational	Implies airport currently has no active commercial service but had or will have commercial service
Closed	Implies airport can no longer be operational for commercial service
Proposed or under construction	Implies airport is proposed or under construction

== List ==
Area served	Airport name	IATA	ICAO	Airport type	Operational	Owned/operated by
Agra	Agra Airport	AGR	VIAG	Domestic (CE)	Operational	MoD and AAI
Aligarh	Aligarh Airport	HRH	VIAH	Domestic	Operational	Govt. of UP and AAI
Ambedkar Nagar	Akbarpur Airstrip	NA	NA	State/private	—	Govt. of UP
Ayodhya	Maharishi Valmiki International Airport	AYJ	VEAY	International	Operational	AAI
Azamgarh	Azamgarh Airport	AZH	VEAH	Domestic	Operational	Govt. of UP and AAI
Bareilly	Bareilly Airport	BEK	VIBY	Domestic (CE)	Operational	MoD and AAI
Chitrakoot	Chitrakoot Airport	CWK	VECT	Domestic	Operational	Govt. of UP and AAI
Etawah	Saifai Airstrip	NA	NA	State/private	—	Govt. of UP
Farrukhabad	Mohammadabad Airstrip	NA	NA	State/private	—	Govt. of UP
Ghaziabad	Hindon Airport	HDO	VIDX	Domestic (CE)	Operational	MoD and AAI
Ghazipur	Andhau Airstrip	NA	NA	State/private	—	Govt. of UP
Gorakhpur	Gorakhpur Airport	GOP	VEGK	Domestic (CE)	Operational	MoD and AAI
Jhansi	Jhansi Airstrip	NA	NA	State/private	—	Govt. of UP
Kanpur	Flight Laboratory, IIT Kanpur	NA	NA	State/private	—	IIT Kanpur
Kanpur	Kanpur Airport	KNU	VICX	Domestic (CE)	Operational	MoD and AAI
Kanpur Dehat	Marhamtabad Airstrip	NA	NA	State/private	—	Govt. of UP
Kushinagar	Kushinagar International Airport	KBK	VEKI	International	Operational	AAI
Lakhimpur Kheri	Lakhimpur Kheri Airport	NA	NA	Domestic	Under land acquisition	Govt. of UP
Lalitpur	Lalitpur Airport			Domestic	Under land acquisition	AAI
Lucknow	Chaudhary Charan Singh International Airport	LKO	VILK	International	Operational	LIAL^{[†]}
Meerut	Dr. Bhimrao Ambedkar Airstrip	NA	NA	State/private	—	AAI
Moradabad	Moradabad Airport	MZS	VIMB	Domestic	Operational	AAI
Noida	Noida International Airport	DXN	VIND	International	Operational	Zurich Airport AG
Prayagraj	Prayagraj Airport	IXD	VEAB	Domestic (CE)	Operational	MoD and AAI
Raebareli/Amethi	Fursatganj Airfield	—	VERB	Domestic	Under construction	MoCA and AAI
Saharanpur	Sarsawa Airport	NA	NA	Domestic (CE)	Operational	MoD and AAI
Shravasti	Shravasti Airport	VSV	VISV	Domestic	Operational	Govt. of UP and AAI
Sonbhadra	Muirpur Airport	—	VI1D	Domestic	Under construction	Govt. of UP and AAI
Sultanpur	Amhat Airstrip	NA	NA	State/private	—	Govt. of UP
Varanasi	Lal Bahadur Shastri International Airport	VNS	VEBN	International	Operational	AAI

^{†} LIAL (Lucknow International Airport Limited) is a consortium of Adani Group and AAI.

== See also ==
- List of airports in India
- List of busiest airports in India
- List of airports by ICAO code (India)
- Wikipedia:WikiProject Aviation/Airline destination lists: Asia#India
