= FlyBig =

Indian regional airline

flybig
IATA	ICAO	Call sign
S9	FLG	KRIS
- Founded: 2020; 6 years ago
- Commenced operations: 21 December 2020; 5 years ago
- Ceased operations: 13 December 2025; 10 months ago
- Fleet size: 4
- Destinations: 24
- Parent company: Big Charter Private Limited
- Headquarters: Gurugram, Haryana, India
- Key people: Captain Sanjay Mandavia (CMD); Chander Bahadur (Head Financial Intelligence and Strategies)
- Founder: Captain Sanjay Mandavia
- Employees: 500
- Website: flybig.in

flybig was an Indian regional airline based in Gurugram, Haryana. It was promoted by Gurugram-based Big Charter Private Limited. The airline began operations in December 2020 and focused on connecting tier-2 cities within India. Prior to ceasing operations the airline operated in north and northwest India.

== History ==
The airline received a No Objection Certificate (NOC) from the Ministry of Civil Aviation and received its Air Operator's Certificate (AoC) on 14 December 2020, both necessary for starting commercial operations. It began operations with a single ATR-72-500. The company's focus is to serve Tier-2 cities and it aims to build a fleet of more ATR-72s and Viking/ DHC Twin Otters, thus eventually expanding to a fleet of 20 aircraft.

Before the airline began scheduled flights, it got its first route under a government tender to serve Shillong from Delhi. The flights commenced on 21 December 2020 and to fulfil its obligations, the airline wet-leased a DHC-8 Q400 aircraft from SpiceJet. The airline conducted proving flights on 4 December 2020, and operated its first scheduled flight on 3 January 2021 from Indore to Ahmedabad. As of March 2024, it has 11 destinations with a fleet of three aircraft covering 3 states.

In November 2023, FlyBig Airlines temporarily ceased operations in Arunachal Pradesh, citing supply chain challenges as the primary reason.

In November 2025, it was reported that the Indian civil aviation authority had received an IDERA (Irrevocable Deregistration and Export Request Authorization) from AER Leasing Corp, the Japanese aircraft leasing company, which is the lessor of flybig's three Indian-registered DHC-6-400 Twin Otters. The aircraft have not performed any flights since October 2025 and are currently parked at Bhopal Airport. An IDERA request is a legal document which enables an aircraft lessor to have its aircraft deregistered and exported from a country if an airline defaults on lease payments. On 8 December, it was then reported that Dubai Aerospace Enterprise (DAE Capital) had won a $1.1 million award from flybig due to the airline's failure to meet lease agreement obligations in relation to previously leased ATR 72 aircraft. While flybig has not performed any flights since the aircraft were grounded in October, the company formally ceased operations on 13 December 2025, when its air operator's certificate (AOC) issued by India's Directorate General of Civil Aviation (DGCA) expired.

== Destinations ==
As of December 2024, FlyBig operates between the following destinations:

State	City	Airport	Notes	Refs.
Punjab	Bathinda	Bathinda Airport		
Punjab	Ludhiana	Ludhiana Airport		
Uttarakhand	Dehradun	Dehradun Airport		
Uttarakhand	Pithoragarh	Pithoragarh Airport		
Uttarakhand	Pantnagar	Pantnagar Airport		
Uttar Pradesh	Aligarh	Aligarh Airport		
Uttar Pradesh	Azamgarh	Azamgarh Airport		
Uttar Pradesh	Chitrakoot	Chitrakoot Airport		
Uttar Pradesh	Lucknow	Chaudhary Charan Singh International Airport		
Uttar Pradesh	Shravasti	Shravasti Airport		
Uttar Pradesh	Ghaziabad	Hindon Airport		
Uttar Pradesh	Moradabad	Moradabad Airport		
Madhya Pradesh	Rewa	Rewa Airport		
Madhya Pradesh	Bhopal	Raja Bhoj International Airport		
Madhya Pradesh	Khajuraho	Khajuraho Airport		
Madhya Pradesh	Datia	Datia Airport		
Chhattisgarh	Raipur	Swami Vivekananda Airport		
Chhattisgarh	Ambikapur	Ambikapur Airport		
Chhattisgarh	Bilaspur	Bilaspur Airport		

== Fleet ==
The flybig fleet consists of the following aircraft as of December 2024:

flybig fleet
Aircraft	In service	Orders	Passengers	Notes
DHC-6-400 Twin Otter	4	8	19	
Total	4	8		

== See also ==
- List of defunct airlines of India
- Transport in India
