= Moradabad Airport =

Domestic airport in Moradabad, Uttar Pradesh, India

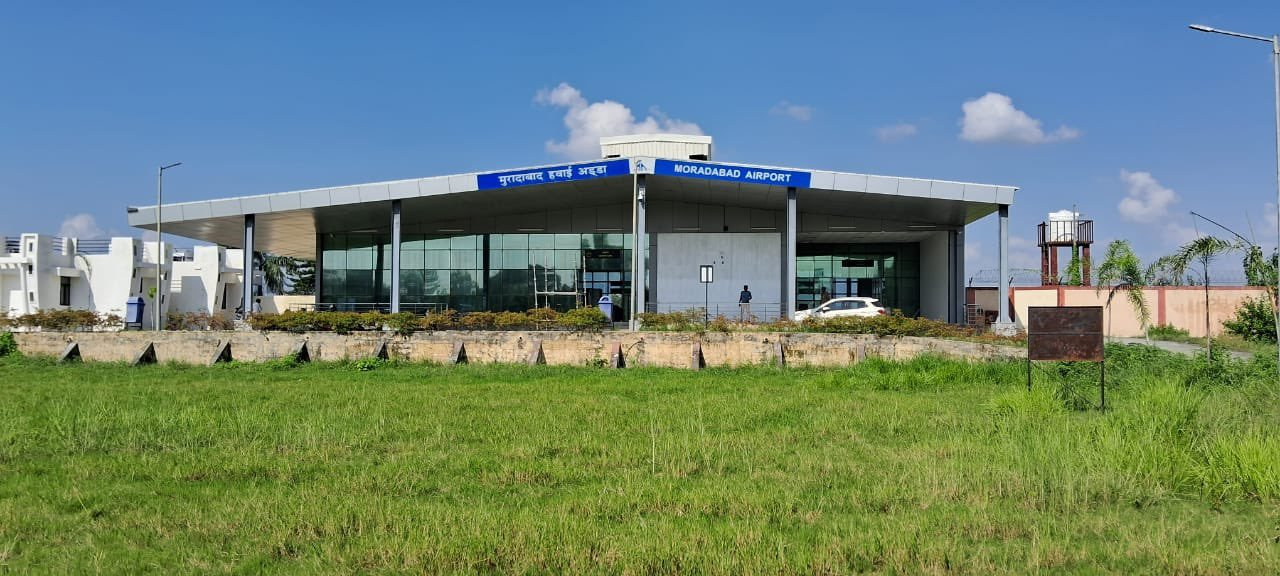
- IATA: MZS; ICAO: VIMB

Summary
- Airport type: Public
- Owner: Government of India
- Operator: Airports Authority of India
- Serves: Moradabad, Rampur
- Location: Moradabad, Uttar Pradesh, India
- Opened: August 10, 2024; 2 years ago
- Elevation AMSL: 637 ft (194 m)
- Coordinates: 28°49′10″N 078°55′24″E

Map
- Location of airport MZS (India)

Runways
Direction	Length		Surface
Direction	ft	m	Surface
12/30	6,929.13	2,112	Asphalt

Statistics (April 2025 - March 2026)
- Passengers: 21 (▼ -96.3%)
- Aircraft movements: 6 (▼ -92.7%)
- Cargo tonnage: 0 ( 0%)
- Source: AAI

Moradabad Airport (IATA: MZS, ICAO: VIMB) is a domestic airport serving the cities of Moradabad and Rampur in the state of Uttar Pradesh, India. It is situated on National Highway 9 between Moradabad and Rampur at almost equal distances from the two cities. Being 19 km (12 mi) from the Moradabad Railway Station and 15 km (9.3 mi) from the Rampur Railway Station, it is strategically located to serve both districts. It has been developed by upgrading the existing government airstrip. The airport became operational on 10 August 2024, with the first flight to Lucknow's Chaudhary Charan Singh International Airport operated by the regional low-cost airline, FlyBig.

Owned and operated by the Airports Authority of India (AAI), it is one of the five key airports in the Western region of the state besides Hindon, Agra, Bareilly and Aligarh. At 63.80 ha (157.65 acres), it is also the 4th largest airport in the region by land area. It has a peak capacity of 100 passengers per day, and is capable of serving up to 100,000 passengers every year. In the future, its capacity is planned to be increased up to 1 million passengers per year.

== History ==
The Union Ministry of Civil Aviation (MoCA) asked the State Government in November 2012 to hand over the airfield in Moradabad along with an additional 120–140 ha (300–350 acres) of land, free of cost, to the AAI in order to upgrade the airfield for commercial operations. The AAI had proposed to develop a taxi track, an apron, isolation bay, navigational aids, localiser, glide path, terminal building, Air Traffic Control (ATC) tower and hangars. The Uttar Pradesh cabinet approved to hand over the airstrip to AAI in September 2013.

The Government of Uttar Pradesh then signed a Memorandum of Understanding (MoU) with the Airports Authority of India (AAI) in February 2014 for the development of this airstrip into a domestic airport. Construction of the airport began in 2015, and it was completed along with an upgraded runway, a taxi track, the approach road, and the passenger terminal in June 2022. The contract was earlier awarded to RITES, but was cancelled and awarded to the Uttar Pradesh State Construction Corporation. The airport was constructed on 52 ha (130 acres) of land at a cost of ₹28.93 crores.

Ministry of Defence, Ministry of Home Affairs, and UP Forest Department granted No Objection Certificate (NOC) to the airport in February 2023, and the license from Directorate General of Civil Aviation (DGCA) was granted in November 2023.

The completed airport was inaugurated on March 10, 2024 by Prime Minister Narendra Modi and Uttar Pradesh Chief Minister Yogi Adityanath in a virtual inauguration ceremony along with 4 other airports. Other airports inaugurated during the ceremony included Azamgarh, Aligarh, Chitrakoot, and Shrawasti airports. This increased the number of operational airports in Uttar Pradesh from 10 to 14, making it the state with most operational airports in the country.

=== Commencement of operations ===
Although the airport was inaugurated in March 2024, the flight operations couldn't be commenced from it at that time. The first flight took five more months, and after multiple delays a 19-seater passenger plane took off from the airport for Lucknow, the capital city of Uttar Pradesh, on 10th of August, 2024.

== Terminals ==
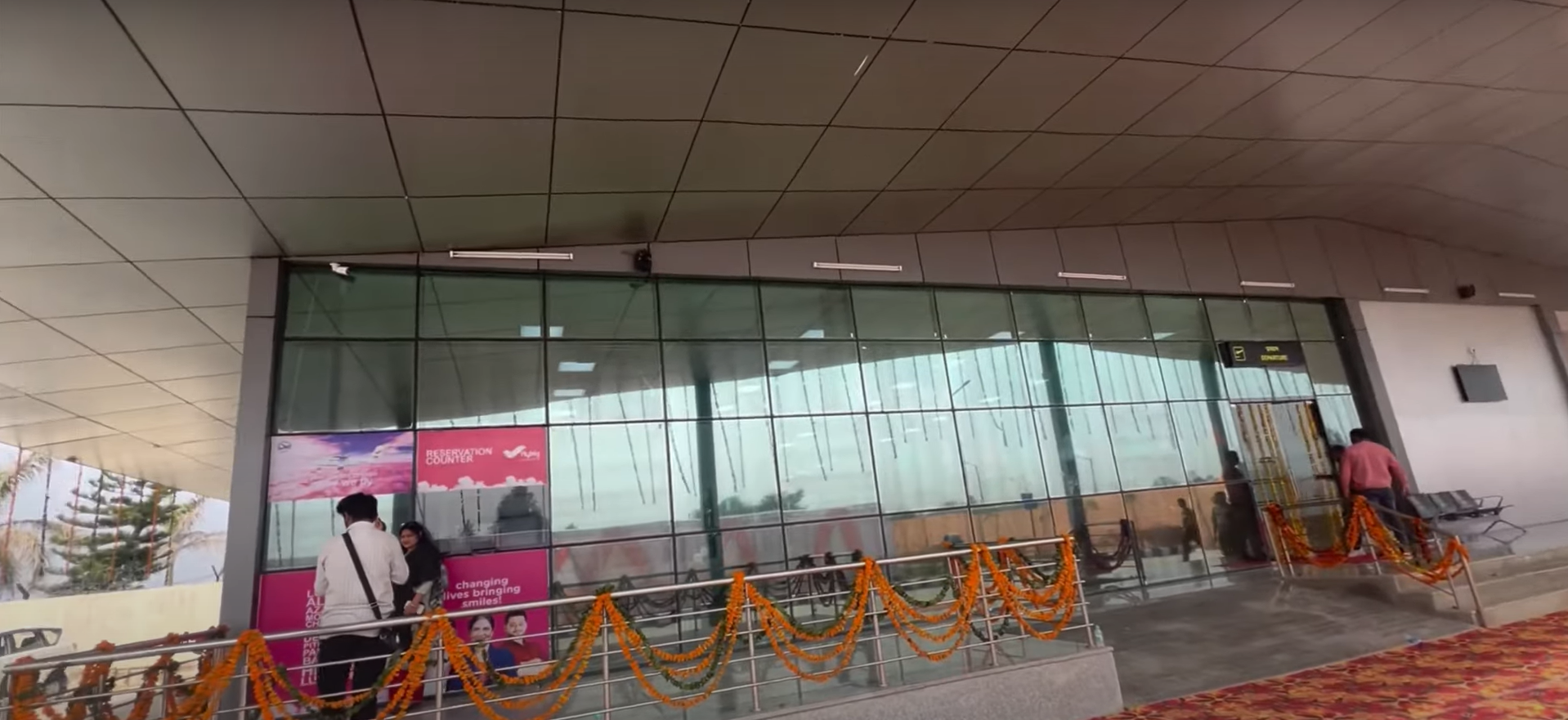
Exterior view of the Moradabad Airport Terminal

The terminal building of the airport spans an area of 1,250 m^{2} (13,500 sq ft). It features:

- 4 check-in counters
- Arrival and departure gates
- Sitting capacity for 50 passengers
- 2 baggage inspection (XBIS) machines
- 2 parking ways

It's set to be expanded or replaced by a larger terminal in the future development plans of the airport.

Other views of the Moradabad Airport Terminal

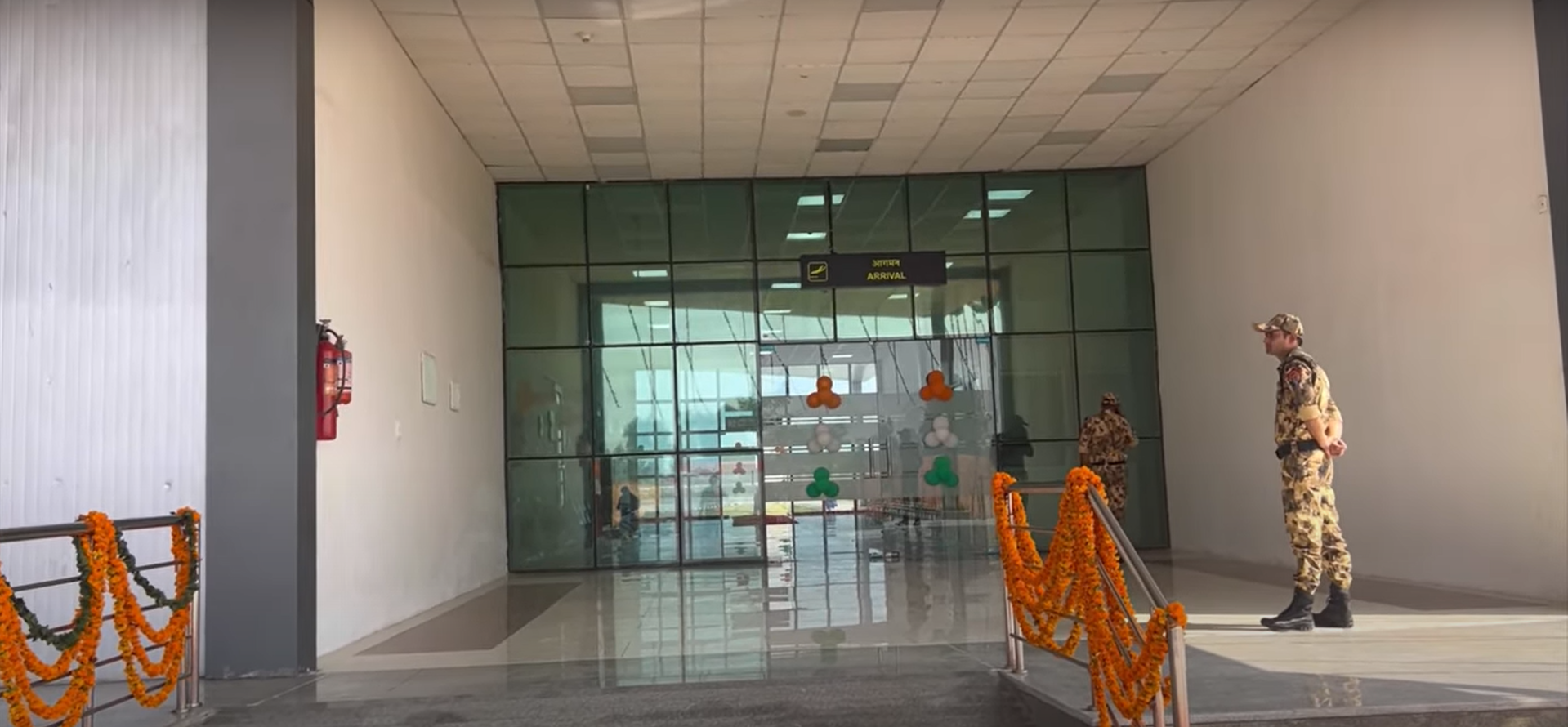

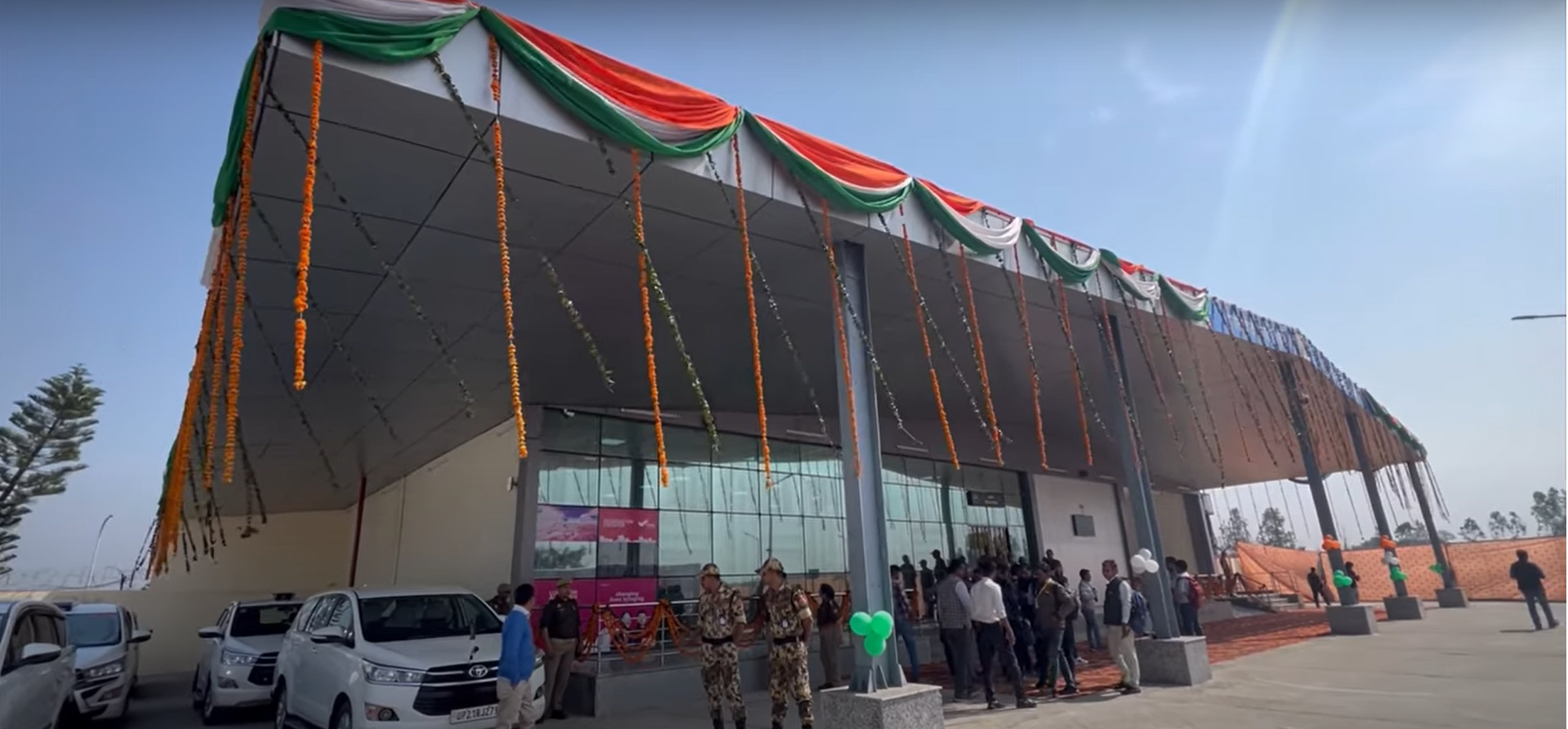

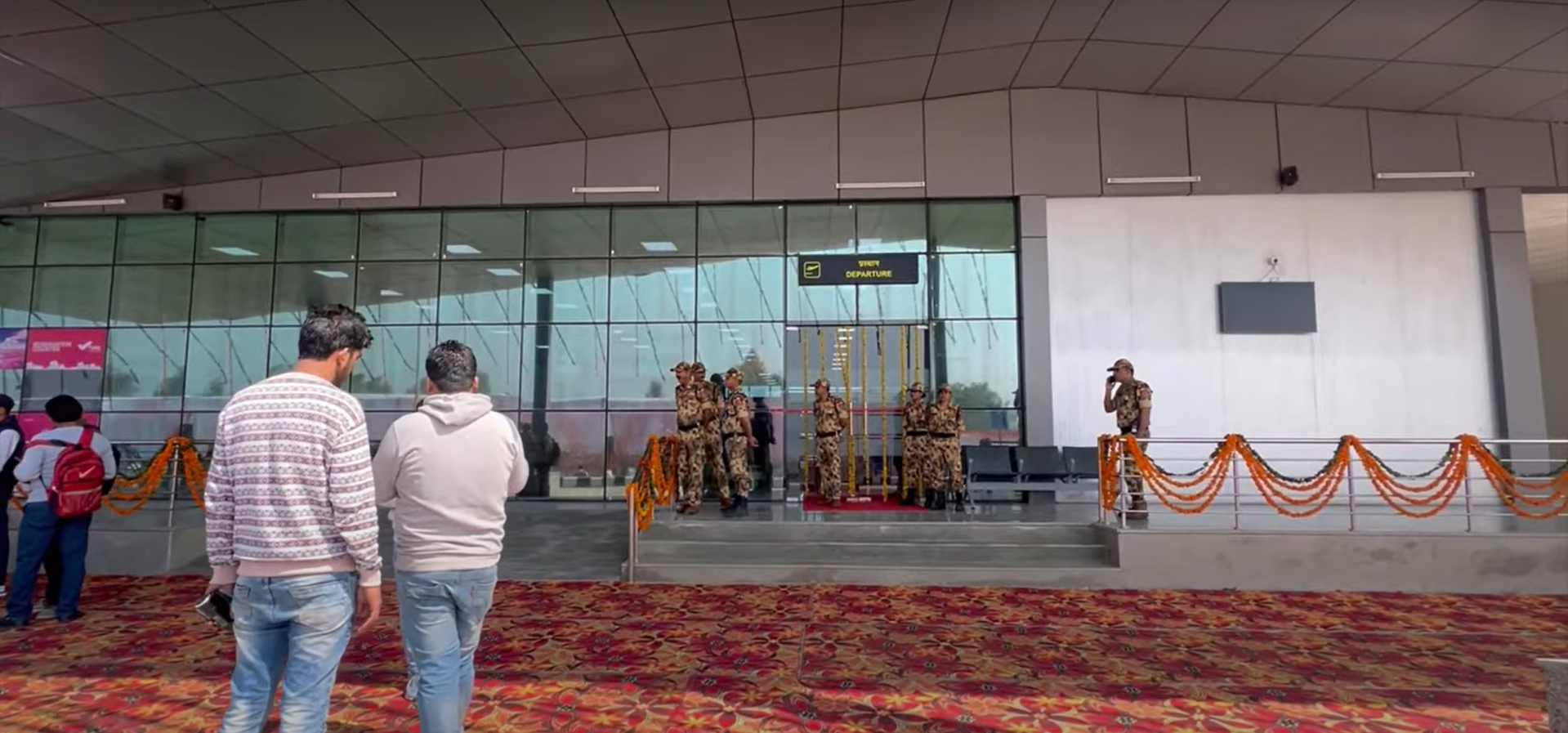

== Statistics ==
Monthly Passengers
Month	Passengers
August 2024	197
September 2024	160
October 2024	162
November 2024	23
December 2024	0

== Airlines and destinations ==
As of August 2024, the airport connects Moradabad to Lucknow. First passenger flight was for Lucknow's Chaudhary Charan Singh International Airport on a 19-seater aircraft from Flybig Airlines in August 2024. More flights are planned for Kanpur, Dehradun, and Ghaziabad (Hindon) in near future.

== Shortcomings and Issues ==
The Moradabad Airport currently lacks an Instrument Landing System (ILS), which is crucial to help the flights in landing under low visibility situations. This leads to flights being delayed or returned whenever there is low visibility due to fog or pollution. A dedicated fuel station is also missing at the moment and flights are refuelled using oil containers transported regularly to the airport.

== Future ==
The AAI plans to expand the Moradabad Airport in two phases, and it has asked for 200 ha (500 acres) of land to be provided free of cost for this expansion from the UP Government. In the first phase, a new terminal building with area of 10,000 square meters is planned, which will increase the peak capacity of airport to 500 passengers per day and 10,00,000 passengers per year. The runway is planned to be expanded to 3,200 m × 45 m (10,499 ft × 148 ft) from the current 2,112 m × 30 m (6,929 ft × 98 ft) to facilitate the landing of Code-C aircraft. Other planned expansions during this phase include:

- Two taxiways
- Apron and ground support equipment for parking of four A-321 aircraft
- New ATS tower
- Fire station
- A larger car parking space

In the second phase, the airport is planned to be further expanded with a terminal building of up to 20,000 square meters. During peak hours, it will be able to handle up to 1,600 passengers per day and up to 25,00,000 passengers per year.
