= UDAN =

Indian airport development plan

"Ude Desh ka Aam Naagrik" Regional Connectivity Scheme (UDAN-RCS)
- Motto: Ude Desh ka Aam Naagrik (Let the Common Citizens of the Country Fly.)
- Type of project: Government's regional airports and routes development scheme with subsidised capped airfares
- Country: India
- Ministry: Ministry of Civil Aviation
- Key people: Kinjarapu Ram Mohan Naidu
- Launched: 21 October 2016; 10 years ago Delhi
- Budget: ₹450 billion (equivalent to ₹690 billion or US$7.4 billion in 2026) initial funding for the development of 50 regional airports ₹5000 per flight (₹30 per seat) levy on trunk routes for the UDAN RCS
- Website: www.aai.aero

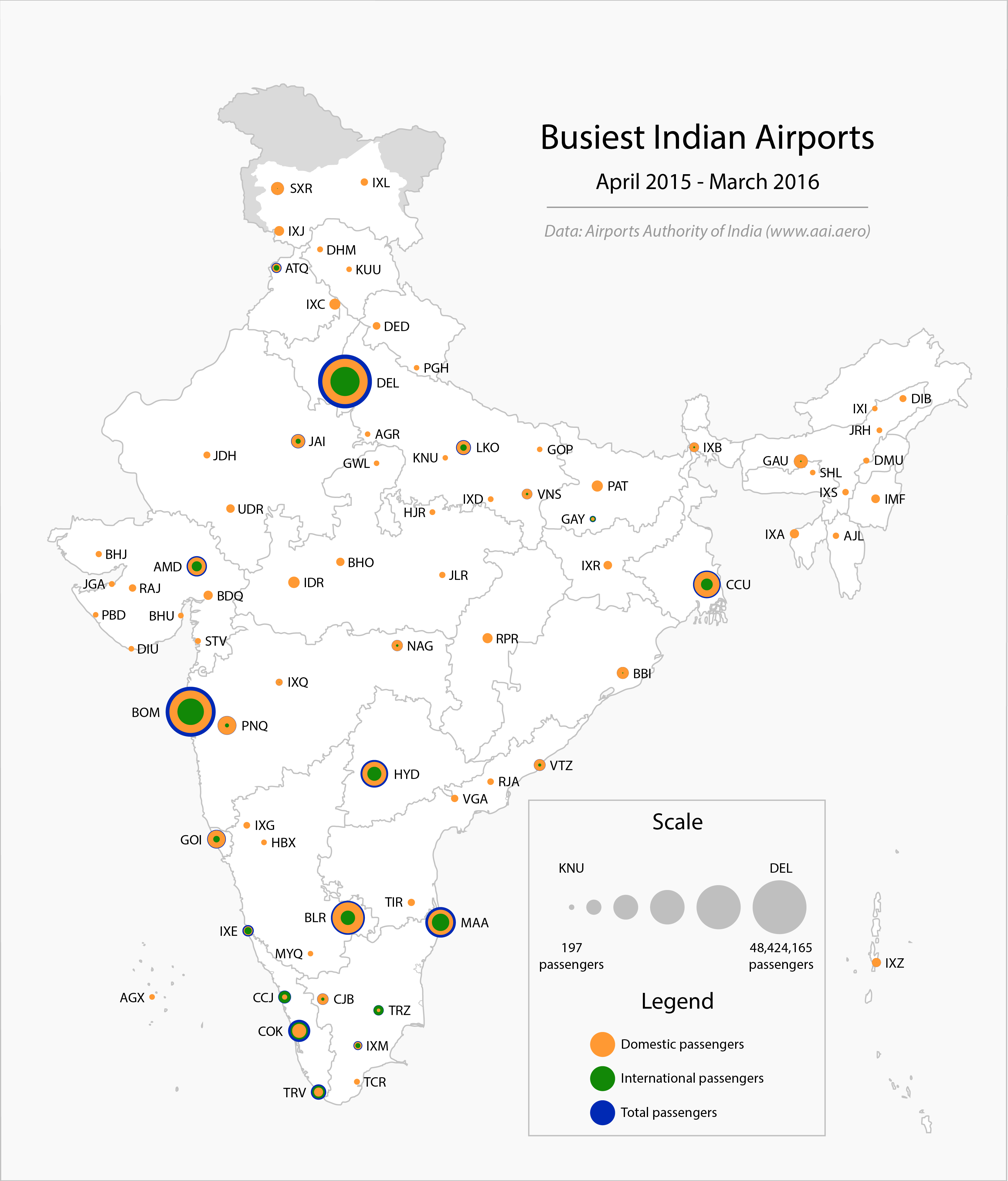
The busiest Indian airports (2015-16).

Ude Desh ka Aam Naagrik (Hindi for "Let the Common Citizens of the Country Fly"), known by its acronym UDAN-RCS ('Udan' is Hindi for "Flight") is a regional airport development programme of the Government of India and part of the Regional Connectivity Scheme (RCS) of upgrading under-serviced air routes. RCS scheme consists of setting up Greenfield airports and as well as upgradation of Brownfield airports. Its objective is to make air travel more accessible and contribute to economic development in India. At the beginning of the scheme, out of a total of 486 airports, 406 were under-serviced and only 27 were well-served; out of 97 non-RCS airports only 12 were operational. The UDAN scheme was created to add to this number by expediting the development and operationalization of India's potential target of nearly 425 unserved, under-served, and mostly underdeveloped regional airports with regularly scheduled flights. However, several issues and criticisms of its poor infrastructure, dominance by larger airlines, degradation of regional airlines, and slow implementation have plagued the scheme. In October 2023, India has 149 operational airports for civil aviation, including 30 international, 12 customs, 107 domestic, and few more civil aviation enclaves within military air bases. India is also planning to build the second airports in the big cities to decongest, 6 by 2030, 15 by 2040 and 30 plus by 2047.

UDAN-RCS is integrated with other Government of India schemes, such as Bharatmala, Sagarmala, Parvatmala, Setu Bharatam, Dedicated Freight Corridors, Industrial corridor, BharatNet, Digital India and Make in India, National e-Governance Plan, Startup India and Standup India.

== Phases ==
UDAN 1.0: 36 new airports were commissioned. 128 flight routes for 70 airports were awarded to 5 airline companies.

UDAN 2.0: A helipad was added for the first time. In 2018, 73 unserved airports were announced.

UDAN 3.0: Several changes were made, including tourist routes, seaplanes to connect water aerodromes, and routes under 'UDAN' in the North-East region.

UDAN 4.0: 78 new routes were approved in 2020. In this phase, the Kavaratti, Agatti, and Minicoy islands of Lakshadweep will also be connected by new routes.

UDAN 4.1: This phase is focused on connecting small airports, special helicopter, and seaplane routes under UDAN. New ways have also been proposed under Sagarmala seaplane services.

== Details ==
The UDAN Scheme is a key component of the Prime Minister Narendra Modi's National Civil Aviation Policy (NCAP) which was released by the Ministry of Civil Aviation on 15 June 2016. The scheme will be jointly funded by the central government and state governments. Several states have come on board by signing the "Memorandum of Understanding" with the union government for this scheme. UDAN RCS will connect an unspecified number of new regional routes by operationalizing 100 regional airports by the end of the 2018-2019 financial year, with a target of 13 lakhs (1.3 million) annual passenger seats. It will require ₹200 crore (2 billion rupees) in viability gap funding (VGF) annually. Qualifying routes must have three to seven flights per week from the same airport.

The scheme has two components. The first component is to develop new airports and enhance the existing regional airports to increase the number of operational airports for scheduled civilian flights from 70 (in May 2016, a total 98 operational including army airports) to at least 150 airports (by December 2018) with regularly scheduled flights. Initially, more than 100 underserved (no more than 7 scheduled flights per week) and unserved regional airports will be developed by December 2018, for which the initial funding of ₹45,000 million (equivalent to ₹69 billion, US$740 million or €660 million in 2026) for the enhancement of 50 regional airports was approved in May 2017. Out of the total 70 airports included in round I, 43 are regional airports to be newly operationalized. RCS-Udan operations have commenced from 13 regional airports and additional 12 regional airports are ready to receive flights. 18 regional airports still require significant upgrades (November 2017). The second component is to add several hundred financially viable, capped-airfare, new regional flight routes to connect more than 100 underserved and unserved airports in smaller towns with each other as well as with well-served airports in bigger cities by using "Viability Gap Funding" (VGF) where needed. Initially, three separate rounds of bidding for the award of routes will be concluded by the end of 2018. Union government's share of "Viability Gap Funding" is from the cess applied to flights to popular routes to main cities and respective state governments have also offered additional benefits to the flight operators to make UDAN-RCS viable.

The number of aircraft increased by 38% to 548 in December 2017 from 395 in 2014, and 50 aircraft are being added every year. Subsequent phases with the inclusion of seaplanes will boost the number of potential landing sites from nearly 500 airports to over five lakhs (500,000) waterbodies as well as more locations along India's 7,000 km coastline. SpiceJet placed a US$400 million order for 100 of these 12-seater amphibian seaplanes (December 2017).

India has 394 unserved and 16 under-served airports; out of a total of these 410 potential-target unserved and under-served regional airports, INR4500 Crore has been approved in the 2016-2017 union budget to revive and further develop 50 airports in the smaller regional towns between 2017 and 2020, 15 airports during 2017–18, another 15 airports during 2018–19, and 20 more airports during 2019–20. A total of 75 airports were operationalized for civilian flights in India since independence, the government has newly operationalized additional 36 regional airports for civilian flights including 3 civil enclaves within the army airports, with regularly scheduled flights, within the single financial year of 2016–2017, with the target to complete a cumulative total of 50 operational regional airports by the end of 2018–2019, and eventually, operationalize a cumulative total of 100 regional airports by December 2018.

Indian prime minister Narendra Modi launched the scheme on 27 April 2017 by flagging off the inaugural regional flights between Delhi and Shimla, and also between Kadapa-Hyderabad-Nanded.

=== Concessions to operators ===
The scheme will run for 10 years and can be extended thereafter.

==== From central government ====
Following concessions from the Government of India:

- Viability Gap Funding (VGF) to subsidize the airfare.
- Concession on service tax on tickets.
- Code-sharing of UDAN-RCS flights permitted with other operators.

==== From state governments ====
Following concessions from the participating state governments at their respective UDAN-RCS airports:

- Reduction of VAT (or GST after GST came into operation) to 1% or less for 10 years.
- Coordinate with oil companies to create fueling infrastructure in airports.
- Provide free land for the development of the airport, with multimodal (rail, road, metro, waterways, etc.) hinterland connectivity.
- Provide free trained security.
- Provision of water, electricity and other utilities at a reduced rate
- Provide a 20% share of Viability Gap Funding; North-Eastern states, Uttarakhand, Himachal Pradesh and Union territories to provide a 10% share only.
- State governments are encouraged to provide additional concessions.

==== From airport operators ====
Airport operators (commercial or private companies, central and state governments or their entities such as AAI and Defence Ministry) must agree to provide the following concessions to participate in UDAN-RCS scheme:

- No landing, parking or other charges charged by the airport operator which could be national govt (AAI) or state govt, or a third party to whom state or national government has outsourced the operation.
- No Terminal Navigation Landing Charges (TNLC) charged by the airport operator for the use of air traffic control (ATC) assistance for landing and take off.
- Allow selected airline to manage the ground handling of flights, e.g. loading and unloading cargo or luggage, boarding and deboarding passengers, etc.
- Route Navigation and Facilitation Charges (RNFC), for the use of national radar network for air navigation, applied on UDAN-RCS flights by AAI at a discounted rate of 42.40% of Normal Rates.
- Fuel subsidies: In India each state levies different taxes on the aviation fuel, and states may decide to waive off full or part of taxes and may even further subsidise the fuel.
- Other state and local subsidies: Each state or local government may offer further subsidies and benefits to the companies operating the flights.

==== UDAN-RCS cargo flights concession ====
Cargo flights will be given similar benefits except no "Value Gap Funding" (VGF) will be provided.

=== UDAN-RCS fares ===
For the fixed-wing aircraft, there is a cap of maximum fare of ₹2,500 per hour of flight for 50% of the seats (min 9 RCS seats and max 40 RCS seats per fixed-wing flight, and max 12 helicopter RCS seats per heli flight), connecting unserved and under-served regional airports, remaining 50% seats will be priced at market rate. Capped RCS fares will also be graded based on distance, e.g. ₹1,420 for a distance of 151–175 km, ₹1,500 for a distance of 176–200 km, and so on, with a ceiling of maximum ₹3,500 fare for a total distance of 800 km or more.

For the helicopter services maximum fare is also capped at ₹2,500 for every 30-minute leg of flight. Capped helicopter fare will be graded on the time of flight, e.g., ₹2,500 for a flight of 0 to 30 minutes, ₹2,900 for a flight of 31 to 35 minutes, and so on, with a ceiling of maximum ₹5,000 fare for a total flight duration of 60 minutes or more.

==== Viability gap funding ====
The scheme entails making the routes financially viable, without insisting on the financial viability of the regional airports, by lowering the cost of flight operations and through financial support in the form of viability gap funding (VGF). VGF will be available to flight operators on specific routes for the first 3 years of operation.

The demand-driven revival and enhancement of the regional airports with financially viable commercial flight routes is based on the combination of seeking firm proposals from Airlines for the names of airports they wish to fly to and MoU-bound commitment from the state governments for providing various concessions for the airport operations, such as state tax concessions, free land and security, etc. Participating states, Northeast states and Union Territories are required to sign the MoU with the union governments to share the 20% and 10% burden of VGF respectively.

To make the routes viable for commercial airlines, the union government offers flexible code-sharing arrangements, reduced excise on value-added tax on fuel and service tax. Airports, some owned by the Airports Authority of India and others by the respective state governments, will not charge the landing and parking charges and terminal navigation landing charges.

Airlines will be given Value Gap Funding (VGF) raised from the RCS levy. Starting from 2017, the airfare cap and VGF in this 10-year scheme will be revised quarterly, based on Consumer Price Index for Industrial Workers.

==== UDAN-RCS levy ====
RCS subsidy will be raised by levying a cess, which will be revised periodically, on the flight between main trunk routes connecting major cities. Starting from 1 June 2017, it is initially at a flat rate of ₹5,000 per flight, translating into roughly ₹30 per passenger.

=== Impact of STOL, seaplanes, ski and bush planes on UDAN-RCS ===
While UDAN phase-I had focused on fixed-wing aircraft, Phase-II included helicopters also. Subsequent phases were supposed to include STOL seaplanes and ski and bush planes operating from STOLports. On 9 December 2017, SpiceJet conducted seaplane trials using a Quest Kodiak aircraft, in association with Japan's Setouchi Holdings, who owned Quest Aircraft company LLC at that time. SpiceJet was planning to buy 100 Quest Kodiak amphibian seaplanes for US$400 million, including long-term parts and maintenance (December 2017) The trials were conducted from Girgaum Chowpatty off the Mumbai coast with Union minister Nitin Gadkari on board. At the occasion, Gadkari claimed that seaplanes had the potential to revolutionize air transport in the country, possibly opening up many more destinations by enhancing the potential pool of landing sites from nearly 500 airports to over five lakh (500,000) waterbodies and thousand more locations along India's 7,000 km long coastline. He said that the Civil Aviation Ministry and Water and River Resources Ministry would soon formulate rules for the seaplane operations along the lines of those in nations like United States, Canada and Japan. A few days later on 12 December 2017, Prime Minister Modi also rode a Quest Kodiak operated from Sabarmati River to Dharoi Dam.

In 2019, the third round of the UDAN scheme awarded 18 air routes connecting six water aerodrome sites to be connected by seaplanes. The water aerodrome sites are Guwahati river front, Nagarjuna Sagar, Sabarmati river front, Shatrunjay Dam, Statue of Unity (Sardar Sarovar Dam) and Umrangso Reservoir.

== List of Airports/Aerocity under UDAN scheme ==
=== Greenfield Airports ===
| Project | Type | Image | Location | Status |
|---|---|---|---|---|
| Aligarh Airport | Domestic airport | | Aligarh, Uttar Pradesh | Completed |
| Alluri Sitarama Raju International Airport | International airport | | Visakhapatnam, Andhra Pradesh | Completed |
| Ankleshwar Airport | Domestic airport | | Mandva, Gujarat | Ongoing |
| Ayodhya Airport | International airport | | Ayodhya, Uttar Pradesh | Completed |
| Azamgarh Airport | Domestic airport | | Azamgarh, Uttar Pradesh | Completed |
| Chennai Parandur Airport | International airport | | Chennai, Tamil Nadu | Ongoing |
| Chitrakoot Airport | Domestic airport | | Chitrakoot, Uttar Pradesh | Completed |
| Darbhanga Airport | Domestic Airport | | Darbhanga, Bihar | Completed |
| Deoghar Airport | Domestic airport | | Deoghar, Jharkhand | Completed |
| Dhalbhumgarh Airport | Domestic airport | | Jamshedpur, Jharkhand | Ongoing |
| Dholera International Airport | International airport | | Ahmedabad, Gujarat | Ongoing |
| Donyi Polo Airport | Domestic airport | | Itanagar, Arunachal Pradesh | Completed |
| Kanpur Airport | Domestic airport | | Kanpur, Uttar Pradesh | Completed |
| Karaikal Airport | Domestic airport | | Karaikal, Pondicherry | Ongoing |
| Kota Greenfield Airport | Domestic airport | | Kota, Rajasthan | Ongoing |
| Kurnool Airport | Domestic airport | | Kurnool, Andhra Pradesh | Completed |
| Kushinagar International Airport | International airport | | Kushinagar, Uttar Pradesh | Completed |
| Ludhiana International Airport | International airport | | Ludhiana, Punjab | Completed |
| Manohar International Airport | International airport | | Mopa, Goa | Completed |
| Minicoy Airport | Domestic airport | | Minicoy Island, Lakshadweep | Ongoing |
| Moradabad Airport | Domestic airport | | Moradabad, Uttar Pradesh | Completed |
| Navi Mumbai International Airport | International airport | | Navi Mumbai, Maharashtra | Completed |
| New Pune Airport | International airport | | Pune, Maharashtra | Ongoing |
| Noida International Airport | International airport | | Noida, Uttar Pradesh | Completed |
| Pakyong Airport | Domestic airport | | Gangtok, Sikkim | Completed |
| Puri International Airport | Domestic airport | | Puri, Odisha | Ongoing |
| Rajkot International Airport | International airport | | Rajkot, Gujarat | Completed |
| Rewa Airport | Domestic Airport | | Rewa, Madhya Pradesh | Completed |
| Shivamogga Airport | Domestic airport | | Shimoga, Karnataka | Completed |
| Shravasti Airport | Domestic airport | | Shravasti, Uttar Pradesh | Completed |
| Surat International Airport | International airport | | Surat, Gujarat | Completed |
| Utkela Airport | Domestic airport | | Utkela, Odisha | Completed |
| Vadhavan Airport | International airport | | Vadhavan, Maharashtra | Ongoing |
| Vijayawada Airport | International airport | | Vijaywada, Andhra Pradesh | Completed |
| Vuakmual Airport | Domestic airport | | Vuakmual, Mizoram | Ongoing |
| Warangal Airport | Domestic airport | | Warangal, Telangana | Ongoing |

=== Brownfield Airports ===
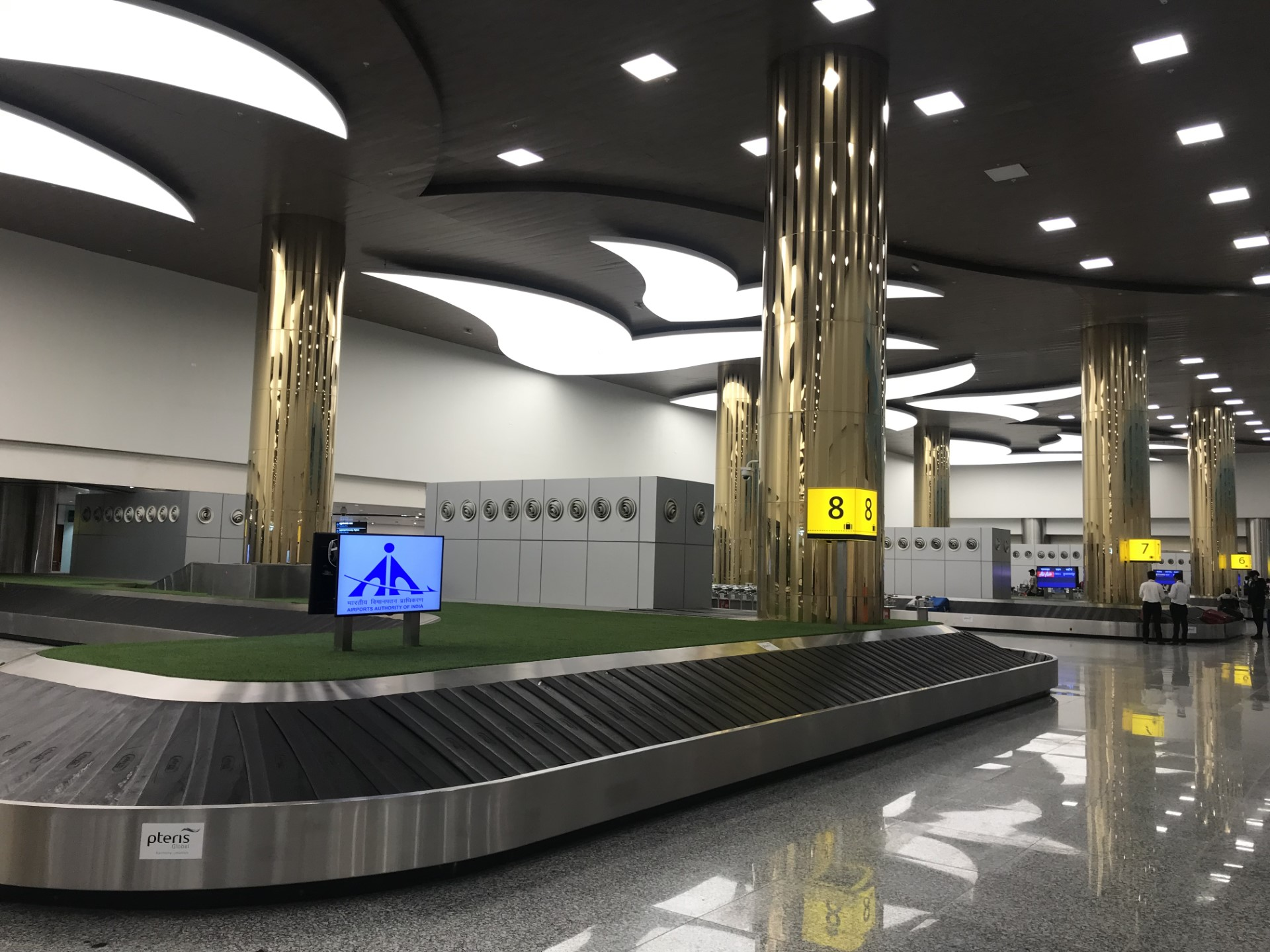
Chennai International T-2 Terminal

| Project | Type | Location | Status |
|---|---|---|---|
| Adampur Airport | New terminal | Adampur, Punjab | Completed |
| Agatti Airport | Military airbase to commercial flights | Agatti, Lakshadweep | Completed |
| Ambala Airport | New terminal in Military airbase | Ambala Cantt , Haryana | Under-construction |
| Bangalore Airport | New terminal T-2 | Bengaluru, Karnataka | Completed |
| Belagavi Airport | New terminal in airport | Belagavi , Karnataka | Under-construction |
| Chennai Airport | New terminal T-2 | Chennai, Tamil Nadu | Completed |
| Pune Airport | New terminal in airport | Pune, Maharashtra | Completed |
| Kadapa Airport | New terminal in airport | Kadapa, Andhra Pradesh | Under-construction |
| Kolhapur Airport | New terminal in airport | Kolhapur, Maharashtra | Completed |
| Jabalpur Airport | New terminal in airport | Jabalpur, Madhya Pradesh | Completed |
| Gwalior Airport | New terminal in airport | Gwalior, Madhya Pradesh | Completed |
| Hubli Airport | New terminal in airport | Hubli, Karnataka | Under-construction |
| Lucknow Airport | New terminal T-3 in airport | Lucknow, Uttar Pradesh | Completed |
| Sarsawa Airport | New terminal in Military airbase | Saharanpur, Uttar Pradesh | Completed |
| Trichy Airport | New terminal in airport | Trichy, Tamil Nadu | Completed |
| Veer Savarkar International Airport | New terminal | Port Blair, Andaman Islands | Completed |

=== Proposed Airports ===
| Project | Type | Location | Status |
|---|---|---|---|
| Chandrapur Greenfield Airport | Domestic Airport | Chandrapur, Maharashtra | Proposed |
| Chaukhutia Airport | Domestic Airport | Chaukhutia, Uttarakhand | Proposed |
| Mandi Airport | Domestic Airport | Mandi, Himachal | Proposed |
| Nizamabad Airport | Domestic Airport | Nizamabad, Andhra Pradesh | Proposed |
| Kishtwar Airport | Domestic Airport | Kishtwar, Jammu and Kashmir | Proposed |
| Kohima Chiethu Airport | Domestic Airport | Chiethu, Nagaland | Proposed |
| Kothagudem Airport | Domestic Airport | Kothagudem, Andhra Pradesh | Proposed |
| Rajpipla Airport | Domestic Airport | Rajpipla, Gujarat | Proposed |
| Ramagundam Airport | Domestic Airport | Ramagundam, Andhra Pradesh | Proposed |
| Dhamra Airport | Domestic Airport | Dhamra, Odisha | Proposed |
| Sabeya Airport | Domestic Airport | Gopalganj, Bihar | |

=== Aerocities ===
| Project | Type | Location | Status |
|---|---|---|---|
| Lucknow Aerocity | new aerocity | Lucknow, Uttar Pradesh | Under-construction |
| Noida Aerocity | new aerocity | Jewar, Uttar Pradesh | Under-construction |
| Navi Mumbai Aerocity | new aerocity | Navi Mumbai, Maharashtra | Under-construction |
| Bengaluru Aerocity | new aerocity | Bengaluru, Karnataka | Under-construction |

== UDAN-RCS connectivity by rounds ==
=== Bidding process ===
AAI aims to operationalize, hundreds of routes in several rounds of UDAN-RCS, from at least 100 regional airports by the end of 2018-2019 financial year. AAI will periodically publish the updated list of participating airports and helipads, with collaboration from their owners, such as central govt, state govt, commercial and private parties, and in addition any entity can list their airport or helipad with the government for this scheme. Three rounds of bidding for operationalization of new routes will be conducted in 2016-2017 and 2017-2018 financial years, more rounds of bidding will follow till the end of 2018-2019. Airlines (including seaplane) and helicopter service providers will bid for the routes with at least nine seats and a maximum of 40 seats for the fixed-wing aircraft and a minimum of 5 seats and a maximum of 13 seats for the helicopters. To ensure the sustainability of the routes by lowering the commercial risk, these "specific" routes will be awarded on an exclusive basis to the winning parties. Preference is given to the bidder who bid for zero-VGF (operators who rely on no government subsidized VGF to sustain their operation), for example, in phase-I SpiceJet bid was zero-VGF, and in Phase-II SpiceJet and IndiGo bids were zero-VGF.

=== UDAN-RCS Round-I (April 2017) ===
This round concluded in April 2017, 5 airlines companies were awarded 128 fixed-wing flight routes to 70 airports (including 27 currently well-served metro airports and 43 regional airports (31 unserved and 12 underserved, 36 out of 43 are newly made operational including 2 civilian enclave within army airports), several of which have already become operational by November 2017 and most of remaining routes will become operational by 15 December 2017. Five airlines are Air Odisha (50 routes, new airline), Air Deccan (34 routes, relaunched airline), Turbo Megha Airways (18 routes), Alliance Air (15 routes, Air India subsidiary) and SpiceJet (11 routes). Several routes are already operational on 13 December 2017 and most of remaining routes, all to be operated by Air Deccan and Air Odisha will become operational by 23 December 2017 and 31 December respectively. SpiceJet was the only bidder with zero-VGF.

=== UDAN-RCS Round-II (December 2017) ===
502 new regional fixed-wing and helicopter routes were bid in 196 proposals (55 counter-proposals from 10 airlines, and 141 initial proposals from 17 airlines including 108 for the fixed-wing and 33 for helicopters) to connect 126 airports and heliports (49 unserved, 15 under-served, 38 well-served and 24 helipads). Second round results will be awarded in late December 2017. SpiceJet and IndiGo are bidders with zero-VGF.

=== UDAN-RCS Round-III (January 2019) ===
The central government has received bids for 111 routes from 15 airlines under the third round of auction for the UDAN scheme. SpiceJet and IndiGo has bid for 37 routes and 20 routes in the third round of auctions. Ghodawat Enterprises Private Limited has bid for total of 15 routes in this round. The Centre did not include helicopter routes under the third round of auctions, as there have already been.

=== UDAN-RCS Round-IV (December 2019) ===
Started on 3 December 2019. In this phase, The Viability Gap Funding has been revised. The funding that was provided for Category 2 and 3 aircraft (which generally have >20 seats) has now been enhanced to all flights in the states of HP, Uttarakhand, J&K, Northeastern states and the islands. Also, the phase will allow operation of helicopter and seaplanes. The phase also plans to promote short-haul routes, meaning no monetary support will be given to operators with stages more than 600 km.

=== UDAN-RCS Round-V (April 2023) ===
Following the four successful rounds of bidding, the Ministry of Civil Aviation has launched the 5th round of UDAN to further enhance the connectivity to remote and regional areas of the country and achieve last mile connectivity on 21 April 2023.

Key Features of UDAN 5.0 are as follows:

- This round of UDAN focuses on Category-2 (20-80 seats) and Category-3 (>80 seats).
- The earlier stage length cap of 600 km is waived and there is no restriction on the distance between the origin and destination of the flight.
- Viability gap funding (VGF) to be provided will be capped at 600 km stage length for both Priority and Non-Priority areas which was earlier capped at 500 km.
- No predetermined routes would be offered. Only Network and Individual Route Proposal proposed by airlines will be considered.
- The airlines would be required to submit an action/business plan after 2 months from the issuance of LoA wherein they submit their aircraft acquisition plan/availability of aircraft, crew, slots, etc. at the time of the Technical Proposal.
- The same route will not be awarded to a single airline more than once, whether in different networks or in the same network.
- Exclusivity will be withdrawn if the average quarterly PLF is higher than 75% for four continuous quarters, to prevent exploitation of the monopoly on a route.
- 25% of the Performance Guarantee to be encashed for each month of delay up to 4 months, to further incentivize quick operationalization.
- Airlines would be required to commence operations within 4 months of the award of the route. Earlier this deadline was 6 months.
- A list of airports that are ready for operation or would soon be ready for operations has been included in the scheme to facilitate quicker operationalization of routes under the Scheme.
- Novation process for routes from one operator to another is simplified and incentivized.

== Summary status table ==
- Total in-scope target current airport: 486
- Total operational airports at beginning of scheme: 39 (27 well-served out of total 62 non-RCS airports and 12 underserved out of total 18 participating underserved regional operational airports).
- Total unserved participating airports at beginning of scheme: 406
- Helicopter routes: Hill states (North-East states, J&K, Himachal Pradesh and Uttarakhand) and oceanic union territories (Lakshadweep Islands and Andaman and Nicobar Islands) only.

| Round | Fixed-wing / helicopter | Routes awarded | Total ports | Unserved ports | Underserved ports | Well-served ports | Winners # of airlines / providers | Operational status |
|---|---|---|---|---|---|---|---|---|
| R1 (2017 Apr) | Fixed-wing | 128 | 70 | 31 | 12 | 27 | 5 Air Odisha-50, Air Deccan-34, Trujet-18, Alliance Air-15, SpiceJet-11. | |
| R1 (2017 Apr) | Helicopter | NA | NA | NA | NA | NA | NA | |
| R1 (2017 Apr) | Waterports | NA | NA | NA | NA | NA | NA | |
| R2 (2017 Dec) | Fixed-wing | 325 | 78 | 29 | 13 | 36 | | |
| R2 (2017 Dec) | Helicopter | | 31 | | | | | |
| R2 (2017 Dec) | Waterports | NA | NA | NA | NA | NA | NA | |
| R3 (2018 Apr) | Fixed-wing | | | | | | | |
| R3 (2018 Apr) | Helicopter | | | | | | | |
| R3 (2018 Apr) | Waterports | | | | | | | |
| R4 (2018 Dec) | Fixed-wing | | | | | | | |
| R4 (2018 Dec) | Helicopter | | | | | | | |
| R4 (2018 Dec) | Waterports | | | | | | | |
| R5 (2019 Apr) | Fixed-wing | | | | | | | |
| R5 (2019 Apr) | Helicopter | | | | | | | |
| R5 (2019 Apr) | Waterports | | | | | | | |
| R6 (2019 Dec) | Fixed-wing | | | | | | | |
| R6 (2019 Dec) | Helicopter | | | | | | | |
| R6 (2019 Dec) | Waterports | | | | | | | |

== Issues ==
Poor infrastructure including the lack of operational readiness of airports in remote areas and lack of availability of bays in the private airports in the large metro cities, shortage of pilots, lack of favorable rules and still pending reforms in DGCA (aviation regulator) and AAI rules and regulations are the main hurdles, most of these the government is responsible for (c. 22 December 2017). Situation will get worse as airlines plan to add 900 aircraft, such as IndiGo 448 (399 A320s and 49 ATRs by 2028 to its existing 150 aircraft), SpiceJet 157 (107 B737-800s and 50 Bombardier Q400s during the 2018–2023 period to its existing 57 aircraft), GoAir 119 (A320 during 2018–2022 to its existing 34), AirAsia 60 (by 2025 to its existing 14), Air India 19 (3 B777-300ER and 16 A320 planes by March 2019 to its existing 155), Zoom Air 19 (5 CRJ-200 and 14 CRJ-900 planes to its existing 2), Vistara 5 (to its existing 17) and TruJet 6 (ATR72-500/600 from 2018 to 2022 to its existing 4). AAI announced that as the part of its ₹200,000 million (equivalent to ₹310 billion or US$3.3 billion in 2026) infrastructure upgrade plans over next 4 years (2021) it will add 273 bays at 24 major airports against the industry requirement of 300 overnight parking bays at 30 airports in next 5 years (c. 22 December 2017). The solution lies in the policy intervention, such as reserving at least 25% bays for the regional routes at the metro airports.

== Criticisms ==
A 2019 analysis by Outlook of the first two phases of RCS routes notes that the success rate of UDAN was less than 20 per cent. Of the 440-odd air routes allotted to 14 major and fledgling airlines under the two phases of UDAN, not more than 40 to 60 routes were operating regularly. This was because smaller operators such as Zoom Air, Trujet, Pinnacle Airlines, Heritage and AAA Aviation had succumbed to operational issues. Industry experts pointed out several operational, technical, procedural and financial problems in the scheme that failed to create a proper ecosystem for smaller operators due to which the operational costs of the operators of small aircraft went so high that the government subsidy could not compensate. The scheme hence benefited only the operators of larger aircraft like the ATR 72 and the Airbus A320.

A close examination of the distribution of successful UDAN routes by operator, shows most of the successful routes have come from large operators like SpiceJet and IndiGo. Both these airlines have chosen to not take the Viability Gap Funding subsidy, but are instead leveraging the scheme strategically towards gaining additional slots for themselves at congested Tier-1 airports and gaining monopoly status on routes. Aviation consultancy firm CAPA India had predicted that the success of the scheme would depend on the participation established airlines, since in its current form, UDAN does not make a business case for small and independent operators who cannot benefit from the economies of scale. In its report, “Indian Aviation Outlook for FY2019", CAPA India pointed out that "the chances of failure of regional airlines operating older aircraft, dispersed across multiple stations without rigorous demand assessment, and in the absence of a maintenance ecosystem is significant". However, UDAN cannot run without small aircraft operators as only small aircraft can land and take off from the majority of the 400 airports that the scheme intends to bring online.

The scheme also faced criticism for the financing model it had adopted. A viability gap funding structure, where a surcharge was levied on tickets on existing routes, which would be used to refund part of the ticket costs for the airlines flying on UDAN route, was adopted which didn't go down well with various quarters.

Critics have also pointed out issues in Scheme execution such as AAI's selection of airports that lack supporting economic activity. Leisure and native traffic alone will not stimulate demand at small airports. Demand for air travel is created and sustained by the presence of industries and the services sector. Critics blame faulty planning of the AAI and political influence. Demand surveys have failed to correctly predict future passenger traffic demand.

== See also ==
- Targeted projects
  - Bharatmala, India's project to connect all district headquarters with highways
  - Diamond Quadrilateral, Subsumed in Bharatmala
  - Golden Quadrilateral, India's project to connect major cities of India forming a quadrilateral
  - Parvatmala, India's project for nation-wide cable car transportation
  - Sagar Mala, India's project to modernise and connect all shipping ports
  - Setu Bharatam, India's project to make all national highways railway crossings free
  - Make in India
  - PM Gati Shakti
- Transport in India
  - Future of rail transport in India
  - Expressways of India
  - List of national highways in India
  - Indian Human Spaceflight Programme
  - Multi-Modal Logistics Parks in India
  - RORO ferries in India
