= Mohammadabad Airstrip =

Airport in Farrukhabad, Uttar Pradesh, India

Mohammadabad Airstrip, Farrukhabad मोहम्मदाबाद हवाई पट्टी, फ़र्रुख़ाबाद
- IATA: none; ICAO: none

Summary
- Airport type: Public
- Owner: Government of Uttar Pradesh
- Operator: Government of Uttar Pradesh
- Serves: Farrukhabad
- Location: Mohammadabad, Farrukhabad, Uttar Pradesh.
- Elevation AMSL: 495 ft / 151 m
- Coordinates: 27°18′57″N 079°27′10″E

Map
- Location of the airport in Uttar Pradesh Mohammadabad Airstrip (India)

Runways
Direction	Length		Surface
Direction	ft	m	Surface
12/30	4,021	1,226	Asphalt
- http://civilaviation.up.nic.in/

Mohammadabad Airstrip is an airstrip situated at Mohammadabad in Farrukhabad district in the Indian state of Uttar Pradesh. It is owned by Uttar Pradesh Government.

== See also ==
- Chaudhary Charan Singh Airport
- Lal Bahadur Shastri Airport
- Noida International Airport
- Kanpur Airport
- Allahabad Airport
- Bareilly Airport
