= Fly Hornbill =

IATA	ICAO	Call sign
—	—	—
- Founded: 2016
- Ceased operations: 2016 (not launched)
- Operating bases: Lokpriya Gopinath Bordoloi International Airport (Guwahati)

Fly Hornbill was a planned Indian Regional airline to be based in Guwahati. The airline was founded in 2016 and planned to start operations in early 2017 to provide air connectivity to North-Eastern destinations in India in place of Air India's subsidiary Alliance Air. However, as of September 2017 operations are yet to begin and any aircraft is yet to be acquired. The airline was seeking approvals from India's aviation regulator DGCA to start operations. The airline has also won the rights to operate flights on many Northeastern routes under the UDAN-RCS scheme. The airline however did not start operations and appears to have shutdown.
