= Ganeshipur Uperhar =

Locality in Saidabad Block of Handia region

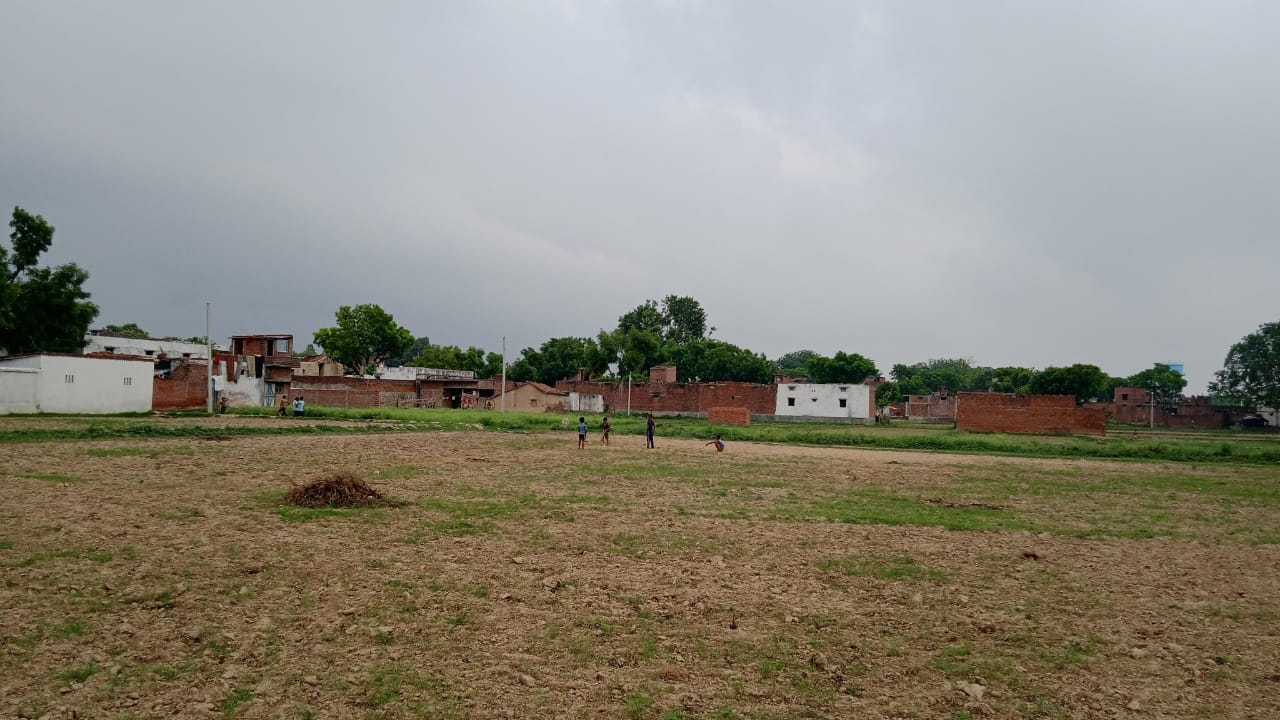
"Ganeshipur village.jpeg"

Ganeshipur Uperhar is a small locality in Saidabad Block of Handia region situated in Prayagraj district, Uttar Pradesh, India. The native language of Ganeshipur Uperhar is Hindi and Urdu.This village consist of two primary school one PHC and Panchayat Bhavan. The current village head is Mr. Suresh Jaishwal And B.D.C. Mr. Vinod Tiwari Ex Village head was Rajbali Yadav And B.D.C. Shri Tribhuwannath Tiwari

== Geography ==
Ganeshipur Uperhar is located at 25°20'5"N to 82°5'54"E. It has an average elevation of 92 metres (301 feet). It is the village comes near on the way of NH-2 also popularly known as G.T. Road (Grand Trunk Road) National highways of India Ganga or Ganges is the only main river in this area. It consists of a canal nearbuy its cultivated land, naming bairagiya naala and small ponds near by this village. It has a very big area of cultivated land naming kachhar.

== Demographics ==
As per the 2011 Census, Ganeshipur Uperhar Village has a population of 4.74 k (4,742) with 2.76 k (2,756) males and 1.99 k (1,986) females.The sex ratio in Ganeshipur Uperhar is 721, indicating a below-average ratio compared to the national average of 943.

In 2024, Ganeshipur Uperhar Village current estimated population is projected to be 5.63 k (5,630), indicating a 18.72% increased from Ganeshipur Uperhar's population in the 2011 census. In 2024, the estimated male population is 3.26k, and the estimated female population is 2.37k.

Ganeshipur Uperhar Village has a literacy rate of 74.5%.

== Transportation ==
The nearest railway station to Ganeshipur Uperhar (Brahmin Basti) is Saidabad and Handia Khas, which is located in and around 6.0 and 14.0 kilometer distance.Other stations and their distances from Mamakudi: Handia Khas railway station, 14.0 km. Meja Road railway station,16.1 km. Bheerpur railway station, 17.6 km. Birpur railway station, 13.6 km. Unchdih railway station, 15.2 km. The nearest airport to Ganeshipur Uperhar (Brahmin Basti) is Prayagraj Airport, situated at 40.1 km distance. A few more airports around Ganeshipur Uperhar are as follows: Lal Bahadur Shastri Airport, 76.5 km. Sultanpur Airport, 103.4 km.
