= Jhansi Airstrip =

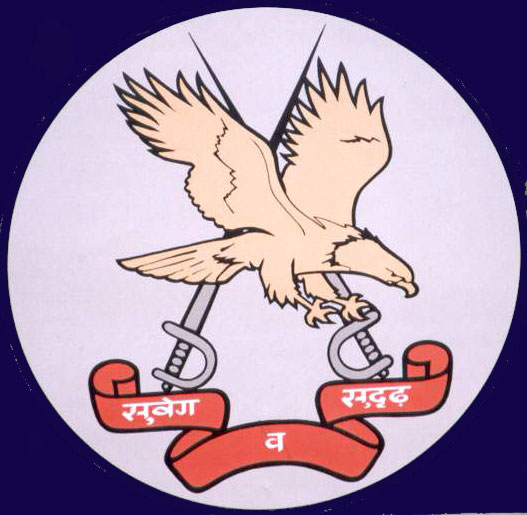
Jhansi Airstrip
- IATA: none; ICAO: VIJN

Summary
- Airport type: Military
- Operator: Indian Army
- Serves: Jhansi
- Location: Jhansi, Uttar Pradesh, India
- Elevation AMSL: 801 ft / 244 m
- Coordinates: 25°29′24″N 078°33′34″E

Map
- Location of the airport in Uttar Pradesh VIJN (India)

Runways
| Direction | Length | | Surface |
| Direction | ft | m | Surface |
|---|---|---|---|
| 15/33 | 3,630 | 1,106 | Asphalt |

Jhansi Airstrip (ICAO: VIJN) is a military airstrip situated in Jhansi city in the Bundelkhand region of Indian state of Uttar Pradesh, which is run by the Army Aviation Corps and owned by Uttar Pradesh Government. The airstrip covers an area of 198 acres. Establishment of an airport was proposed by government by upgrading the existing government airstrip, which is now replaced by a new greenfield airport project.

== History ==
Jhansi airport was handed over by the DGCA to the National Airports Authority in 1986. The airport was then handed over for maintenance to the UP Government. In 1990, the State Government handed over the air field to the Indian Army.

== Extension plan ==
The Uttar Pradesh government has prepared a blueprint to expand and develop Jhansi airport to open up the backward Bundelkhand region for tourism. Its development as a civil airport would facilitate easy access to Khajuraho (150 km away in Madhya Pradesh) and boost to tourism in and around Jhansi, which is the nerve centre of Bundelkhand. The airstrip has existed from the British days and is largely used for military purposes. The clearances for development of the airstrip into a full-fledged airport has been given by highest level in the state. Through Regional connectivity scheme soon a Jhansi-Lucknow flight will start.

Lucknow-Jhansi route was selected under UDAN 2, but flight operations have not commenced yet. Jhansi-Agra and Jhansi-Khajuraho routes have been suggested for UDAN 3 by the government.

== New Airport ==
In December 2021, Amar Ujala newspaper reported that extension plans are replaced by a new Greenfield Airport proposal.

== Datia Airport ==
In 2023, Airport Authority of India started to upgrade the Datia Airstrip into Datia Airport which is near Jhansi city but in Madhya Pradesh state. Proposed Datia Airport is 29 kilometres away from Jhansi City and will serve both cities of Datia and Jhansi.

== See also ==
- Lucknow International Airport
- Varanasi International Airport
- Noida International Airport
- Kanpur Airport
- Allahabad Airport
- Ayodhya Airport
- Sultanpur Airport
