= List of airports in Mizoram =

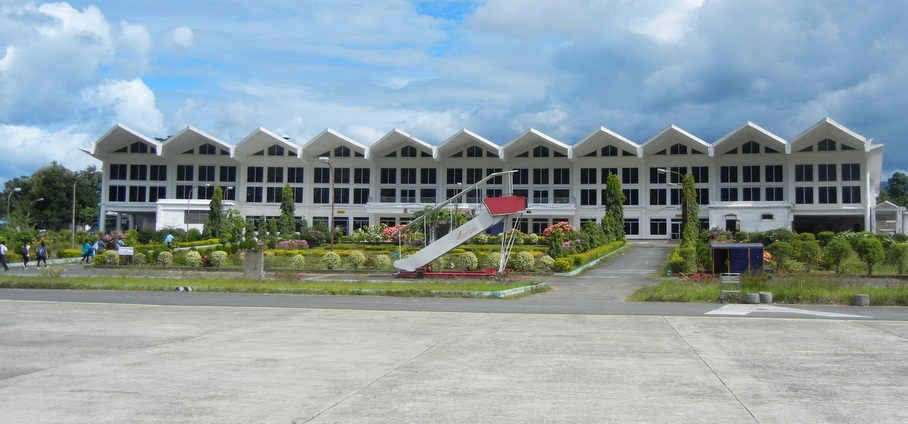
Lengpui Airport, Aizawl

The Indian state of Mizoram currently has only one operational airport, the Lengpui Airport, 30 km from the state capital Aizawl. The airport is connected to several prominent Indian cities like Delhi, Guwahati and Kolkata. An airport was proposed to be built at Lunglei in the southern part of Mizoram to improve connectivity in the hilly state, with planned site at Vuakmual Airport. There are several helipads in the state used by regional helicopter companies to facilitate tourists.

== List ==
The list includes the airports in Mizoram with their respective ICAO and IATA codes.

List of airports in Mizoram
Sl. no.	Location in Mizoram	Airport name	ICAO	IATA	Operator	Category	Role
1	Aizawl	Lengpui Airport	VELP	AJL	Airports Authority of India	Domestic	Commercial
2	Lunglei	Vuakmual Airport	—	—	Government of Mizoram	Domestic (Proposed)	Commercial/Military
