= National Civil Aviation Policy =

Indian Government Policy

National Civil Aviation Policy (NCAP 2016) is government policy approved by Union Cabinet on 15 June, 2016. The NCAP 2016 covers the broad policy areas, such as Regional connectivity, Safety, Air Transport Operations, 5/20 Requirement for International Operations, Bilateral traffic rights, Fiscal Support, Maintenance, Repair and Overhaul, Air-cargo, Aeronautical 'Make in India'. The UDAN Scheme which was launched on April 27, 2017 by PM Narendra Modi, is a key component of the National Civil Aviation Policy (NCAP).

The broad key features of the NCAP are:

- VGF for operation under Regional Connectivity Scheme (RCS).
- Revival of un-served or under-served routes under RCS.
- Introduction of a new Category 'Schedule Commuter Operator' under Commercial Air Transport Operations.
- Rationalization of Category-I routes under Route Dispersal Guidelines (RDGs) on the basis of criteria given in NCAP 2016.
- The requirement of 5 years and 20 aircraft for international operation has been modified to 0 years and 20 aircraft or 20% of the total capacity (in terms of average number of seats on all departure put together) whichever is higher for domestic operations.
- Liberalization of domestic code share points in India within the framework of ASA.

== See also ==
- Aviation in India
