= Alliance Air (India) =

Indian airline

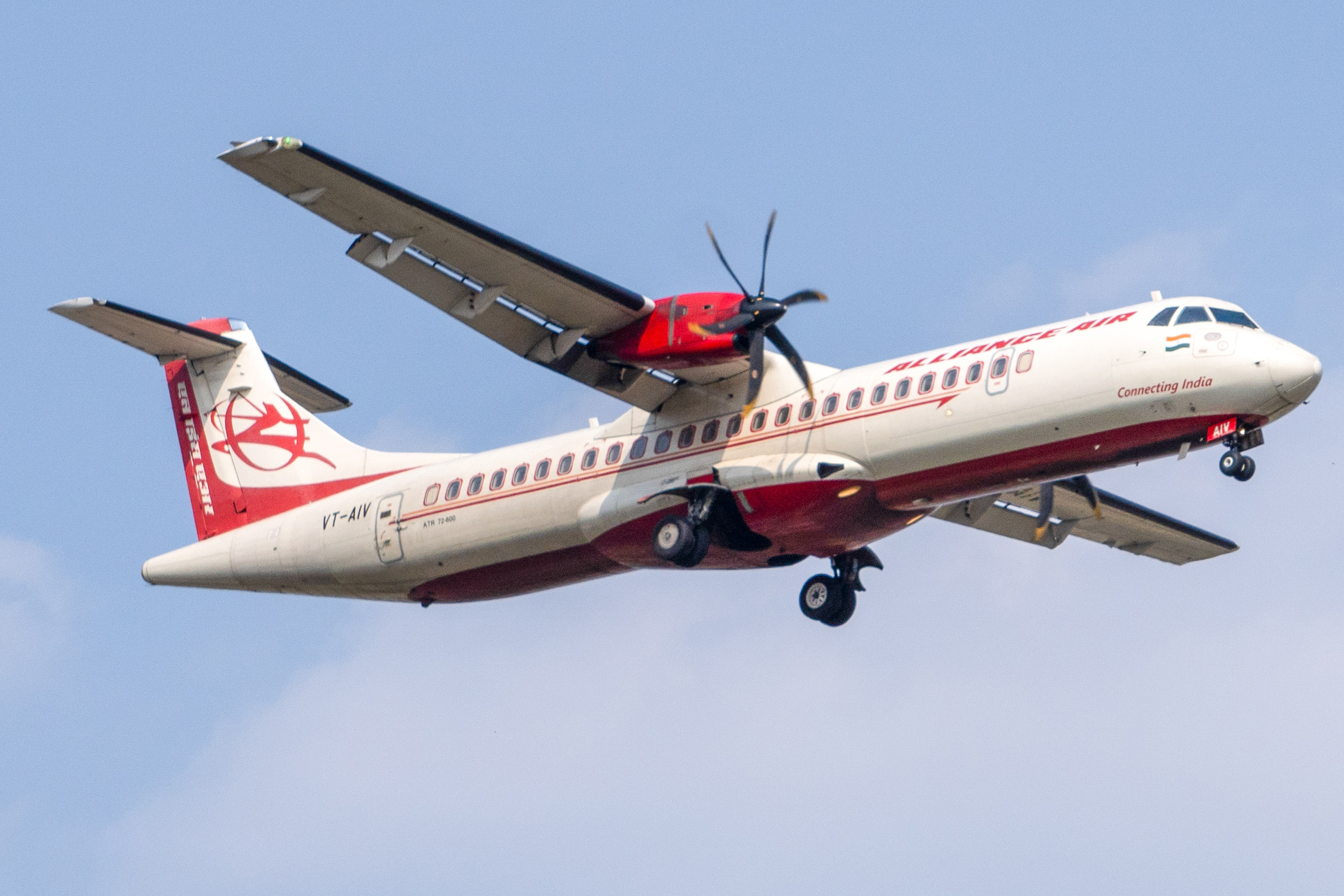
IATA	ICAO	Call sign
9I	LLR	ALLIED
- Commenced operations: 15 April 1996; 30 years ago
- Hubs: Bengaluru; Chennai; Delhi; Hyderabad; Kolkata; Mumbai
- Fleet size: 21
- Destinations: 57
- Parent company: AI Assets Holding Limited (Government of India)
- Headquarters: Delhi, India
- Key people: Rajarshi Sen, CEO
- Revenue: ▲₹72.41 billion (US$750 million) (FY 2021-22)
- Operating income: ▼₹−44.64 billion (US$−460 million) (FY 2021-22)
- Profit: ▼₹−44.74 billion (US$−460 million) (FY 2021-22)
- Total equity: ▼₹280.50 billion (US$2.9 billion) (FY 2021-22)
- Employees: 835 (as of 31 March 2022)
- Website: www.allianceair.in

Alliance Air (formerly Air India Regional) is a state-owned Indian regional airline. Headquartered in Delhi, the airline operates mainly on domestic routes as part of the government's UDAN regional connectivity scheme. As of May 2024, it operated to 57 destinations from its hubs at Bengaluru, Chennai, Delhi, Hyderabad, Kolkata, and Mumbai, with a fleet of 21 aircraft consisting of ATR 72-600, ATR 42-600, and Dornier 228.

Alliance Air was established as a subsidiary of the government owned Indian Airlines in April 1996. After the merger of Indian Airlines with Air India in 2011, it was named as Air India Regional. When Air India was sold to Tata Sons in 2021, the ownership of the airline was retained by the government. It became part of AI Assets Holding Limited, a special purpose vehicle, was formed by the government.

== History ==
Alliance Air was founded in April 1996 as a wholly owned subsidiary of the state-owned Indian Airlines. The parent company wet-leased 12 Boeing 737 aircraft to Alliance Air. Alliance Air began its operations on 15 April 1996. It served as a low-cost feeder airline for Indian Airlines, providing connections to the latter's hubs from smaller cities across the country. On 1 April 1997, the flight operations of Vayudoot, which had earlier merged with Indian Airlines in 1993, was transferred to Alliance Air. In 2002, the airline connected to 44 destinations in India utilising a fleet of 11 Boeing 737-200s.

In 2007, the Government of India announced the merger of Indian Airlines with Air India. Alliance Air became a subsidiary of Air India after the merger was completed in 2011, and was rebranded as "Air India Regional". In November 2013, Air India announced that it would dry lease eight ATR 72 aircraft to replace Alliance Air's ageing fleet of CRJ700 aircraft. The airline inducted its first ATR 72-600 aircraft in to its fleet in December 2014, and the last CRJ700 aircraft was phased out in 2017. In 2016, the airline was delegated to kick-start the Indian Government's UDAN regional connectivity scheme to connect unserved and under-served airports in the country, and the airline placed orders for ten ATR 72 aircraft in October 2016. It began operating its first and only scheduled international flight from Chennai to Jaffna on 11 November 2019. The airline recorded an operating profit for the first time during the 2019–20 fiscal year, after it declared an operating profit of ₹650.9 million (equivalent to ₹840 million or US$8.7 million in 2026).

Air India was sold to Tata Sons on 8 October 2021. However, Alliance Air was not a part of the deal, and was instead transferred to AI Assets Holding Limited, a state-owned special purpose vehicle that held Air India's remaining assets and liabilities. Alliance Air was valued at around ₹2 billion (US$21 million), and it was reported at the time that the government also intended to sell the airline in the future and use the proceeds to pay down the remaining debt. It started functioning independent of Air India on 15 April 2022 and reverted to its Alliance Air name. In September 2021, the airline signed an agreement with Hindustan Aeronautics Limited (HAL) to lease two 17-seater Dornier 228 aircraft, and the first aircraft was delivered on 7 April 2022. The Dornier 228, which had previously only been used by the Indian Armed Forces, was modified by the HAL for commercial operations, and on 12 April 2022, Alliance Air became the first airline to use an Indian-made aircraft in civil aviation operations. In February 2022, the airline signed a deal to acquire two ATR 42 aircraft for serving smaller airfields in the Himalayan region.

== Destinations ==
As of May 2024, Alliance Air operates to 57 destinations in India from its hubs at It operates regional services in India through its hubs Bengaluru, Chennai, Delhi, Hyderabad, Kolkata, and Mumbai. The airline started its first international flight from Chennai to Jaffna on 11 November 2019, which was paused in 2020, before resuming in July 2023, and was eventually terminated in November 2024.

== Fleet ==
=== Current fleet ===
As of July 2026, Alliance Air operates the following aircraft:

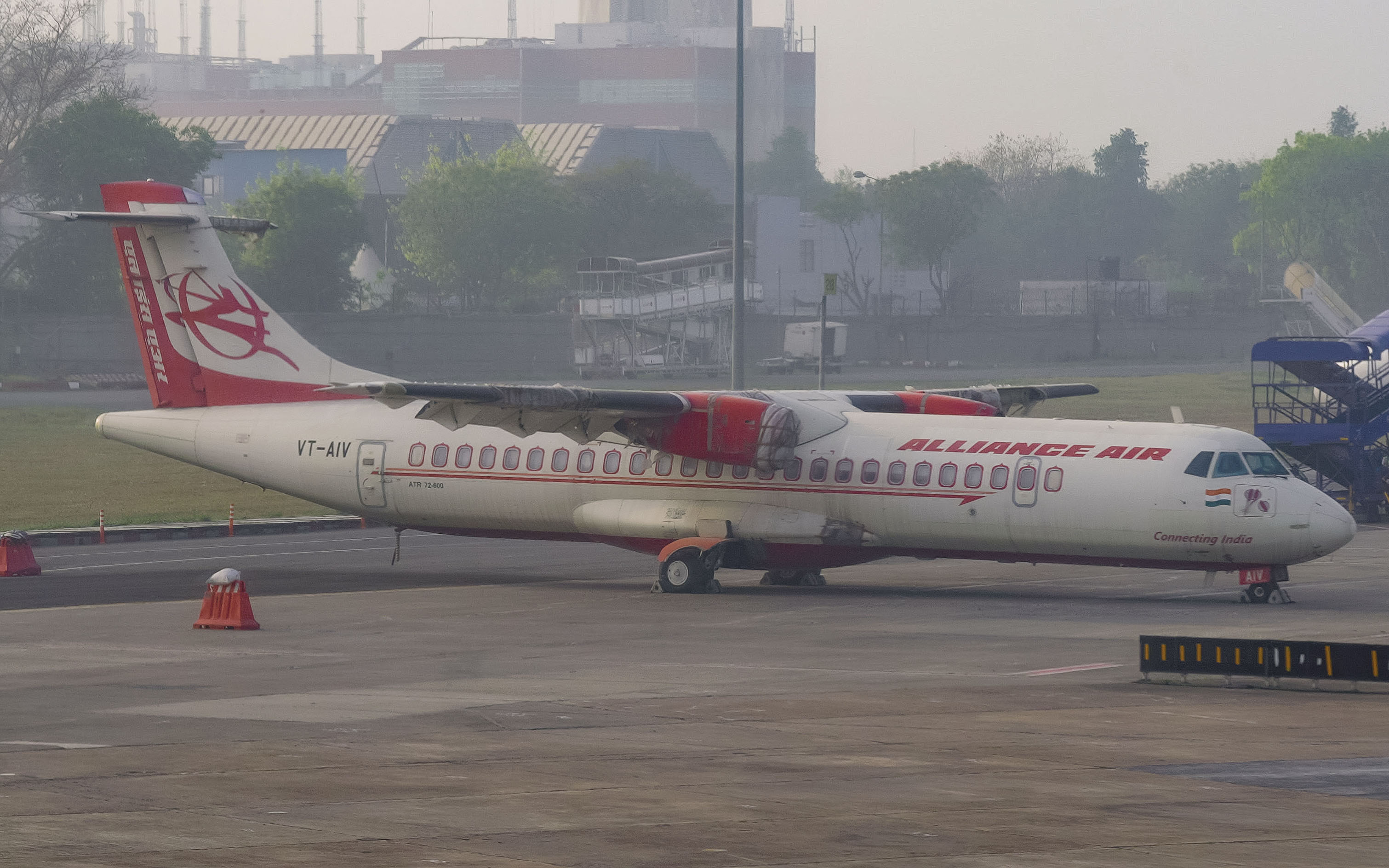
Alliance Air ATR 72-600

Alliance Air fleet
Aircraft	In service	Orders	Passengers	Notes
ATR 42-600	2	–	48	–
ATR 72-600	18	–	72	–
Dornier 228	1	1	17	–
Total	21	1	–	

=== Former fleet ===
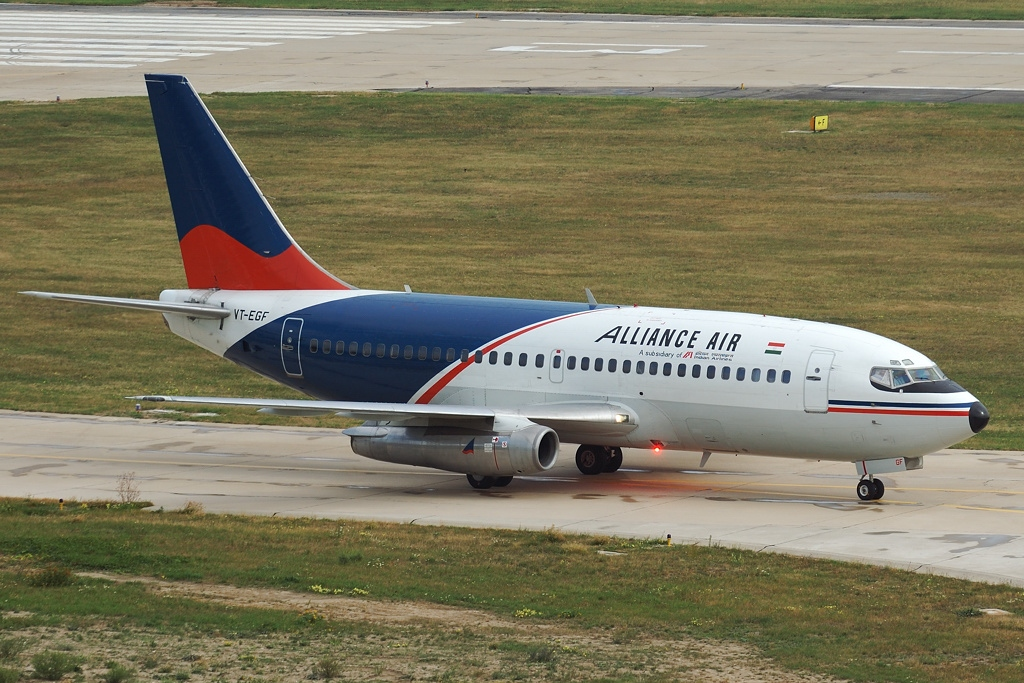
Boeing 737-200 previously operated by Alliance Air

As of August 2025, Alliance Air operated 2 ATR 42-600, 18 ATR 72-600 and 1 Dornier 328.

Aircraft	Retired	Notes
Boeing 737-200	2008	5 Converted into Cargo for Air India Cargo
Bombardier CRJ700	2017	Returned to Lessor
ATR 42-300	2020	Stored

== Accidents and incidents ==
On 17 July 2000, Alliance Air Flight 7412, a Boeing 737-200, crashed into a residential area during its approach to the Patna Airport, resulting in 60 fatalities, including five people on the ground.

== See also ==
- Air India Express
- Air India Cargo
- Air India Air Transport Services
- Airline Allied Services
