= Aligarh Airport =

Domestic airport in Aligarh, Uttar Pradesh, India

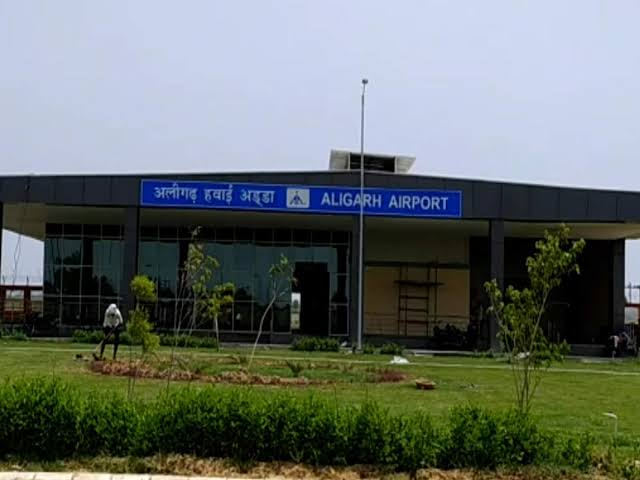
- IATA: HRH; ICAO: VIAH

Summary
- Airport type: Public
- Owner: Government of Uttar Pradesh
- Operator: Airports Authority of India
- Serves: Aligarh
- Location: Khangarhi, Aligarh, Uttar Pradesh, India
- Opened: 10 March 2024; 2 years ago
- Elevation AMSL: 619 ft (189 m)
- Coordinates: 27.8592°N 78.1487°E
- Website: Aligarh Airport

Map
- Location of the airport in Uttar Pradesh HRH (India)

Runways
Direction	Length		Surface
Direction	ft	m	Surface
11/29	3,920	1,195	Asphalt

Statistics (April 2024 - March 2025)
- Passengers: 35 (▼ -97.2%)
- Aircraft movements: 27 (▼ -88.8%)
- Cargo tonnage: -
- Source: AAI

Aligarh Airport (IATA: HRH, ICAO: VIAH) is a domestic airport serving the city of Aligarh in Uttar Pradesh, India. It is located at Khangarhi on National Highway 34 (NH-34), about 11 km (6.8 mi) away from the city centre. It is a key infrastructure project developed under the Government of India's Regional Connectivity Scheme (RCS), also known as UDAN (Ude Desh ka Aam Naagrik). Built by upgrading an existing government-owned airstrip, it officially opened for commercial operations on 10 March 2024, after inauguration by Prime Minister Narendra Modi, with flights to cities within the state to Lucknow, Azamgarh and Chitrakoot, operated by the regional low-cost airline, FlyBig.

== First phase ==
On 1 January 2024, the Directorate General of Civil Aviation (DGCA) issued the license for flying, allowing for commercial operations to commence. The first commercial aircraft at Aligarh Airport was a 19-seater FlyBig airline's flight from Lucknow, which began on March 11, 2024, the day after the airport's inauguration.

While starting air travel between Aligarh and Lucknow, there were indications of starting travel from Aligarh to Kanpur, Aligarh to Azamgarh and other places. The aviation company which is operating flights from Aligarh is making preparations to start travel from Aligarh to Azamgarh first at the level of the same company.

== Second phase ==
In the second phase, flight services to other cities are to be started from here through 90-seater aircraft. Even the biggest aircraft like Airbus-320 and Boeing-737 will be able to land here. This airport is being prepared for international standards. A 3.3 km long runway is also being prepared. The Airport Authority has demanded 675 acres of land for the runway. Out of this, about 300 acres of land has been acquired, while 376 acres of land is being acquired further.

== Statistics ==
Monthly Passengers
Month	Passengers
July 2024	100
August 2024	258
September 2024	142
October 2024	167
November 2024	75
December 2024	26
