= Air Odisha =

Indian regional airline

IATA	ICAO	Call sign
6X	—	—
- Founded: 2011; 15 years ago
- Commenced operations: 2012; 14 years ago
- Ceased operations: 2018; 8 years ago
- Hubs: Biju Patnaik Airport (Bhubaneswar)
- Fleet size: 1
- Parent company: Air Odisha Aviation Private Limited (AOAPL)
- Headquarters: Bhubaneswar, Odisha, India
- Key people: Ashutosh Pani (Managing Director)
- Website: www.airodisha.com

Air Odisha was an Indian regional airline based in Bhubaneswar, Odisha incorporated on 25 Jan, 2011 as Air Odisha Aviation Pvt. Ltd. It operated daily flights to numerous destinations across India, according to the Regional Connectivity Scheme. The airline officially had its base at Biju Patnaik International Airport with an additional operation base at Sardar Vallabhbhai Patel International Airport. It has since suspended operations.

== History ==
Air Odisha Aviation Private Limited (AOAPL) was formed under Companies Act, Government of Odisha to provide air charter service. It is one of the regional scheduled airlines of India. The airline received its license to commence scheduled operations on 13 February 2018, i.e. valid up to 12 February 2021.

In February 2018, 60% of Air Odisha's stake was sold to GSEC Monarch Aviation, an Adani Group enterprise.

== Fleet ==
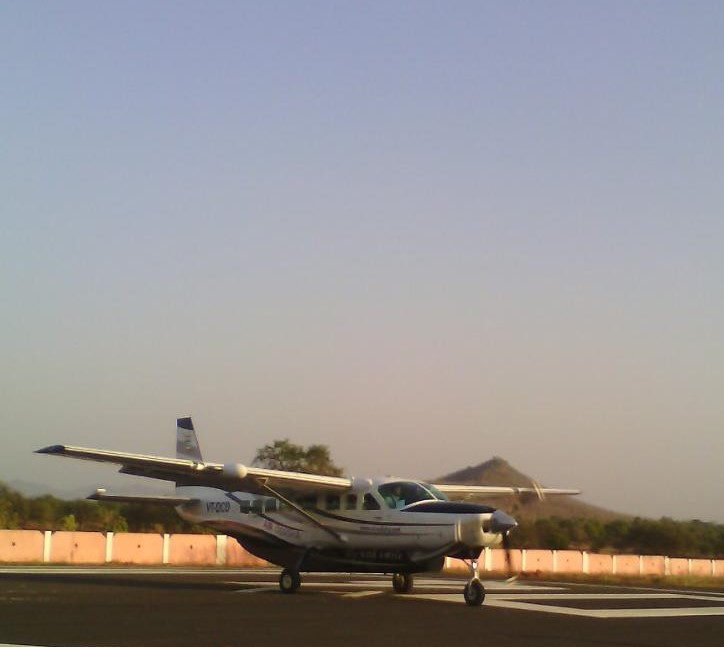
Air Odisha's Cessna 208 Caravan at Utkela Airstrip in Bhawanipatna, Odisha

Prior to ceasing operations, the Air Odisha fleet consisted of the following aircraft:

Air Odisha fleet
Aircraft	In service	Orders	Passengers	Notes
Beechcraft 1900 D	1		19	
Cessna 208 Caravan	1		19	
Total	2			
