= Mohammadabad, Farrukhabad =

Mohammadabad
- Town
- Location in Uttar Pradesh, India
- Coordinates: 27°20′N 79°30′E
- Country: India
- State: Uttar Pradesh
- District: Farrukhabad

Government
  - Type: Chairman–Usha Devi
  - Body: Nagar Panchayat Mohammadabad
- Elevation: 61 m (200 ft)

Population (2001)
  - Total: 20,504

Languages
  - Official: Hindi
- Time zone: UTC+5:30 (IST)

Mohammadabad is a town and a nagar panchayat in Farrukhabad district in the Indian state of Uttar Pradesh.

== Demographics ==
As of 2011 Indian census, Mohammadabad had a population of 24,687. The sex ratio is 864 women per 1000 men. Mohammadabad has an average literacy rate of 78.5%, substantially higher than the national average. The male literacy rate is 85.63%, and female literacy is 70.12%. In Mohammadabad, 18% of the population is under 6 years of age.

== Geography ==
Mohammadabad has a 61 m elevation from sea level.

Religions in Mohammadabad
Religion	Percent
Hindus	83%
Muslims	16%
Jains	0.5%
Others†	0.5%
Distribution of religions †Includes Sikhs (0.2%), Buddhists (<0.2%).

†Includes Sikhs (0.2%), Buddhists (<0.2%).
