= Airline Allied Services =

Airline Allied Services Limited
- Founded: 1983; 43 years ago
- Owner: Government of India
- Parent: Air India Assets Holding limited

Airline Allied Services Limited (AASL) is Public Sector Undertaking (PSU) of the Government of India and is a subsidiary of Air India Assets Holding limited. Established in 1983, AASL provides air transport services under the name "Alliance Air". AASL is headquartered in New Delhi.
