= Kushinagar International Airport =

International airport in Kushinagar, Uttar Pradesh, India

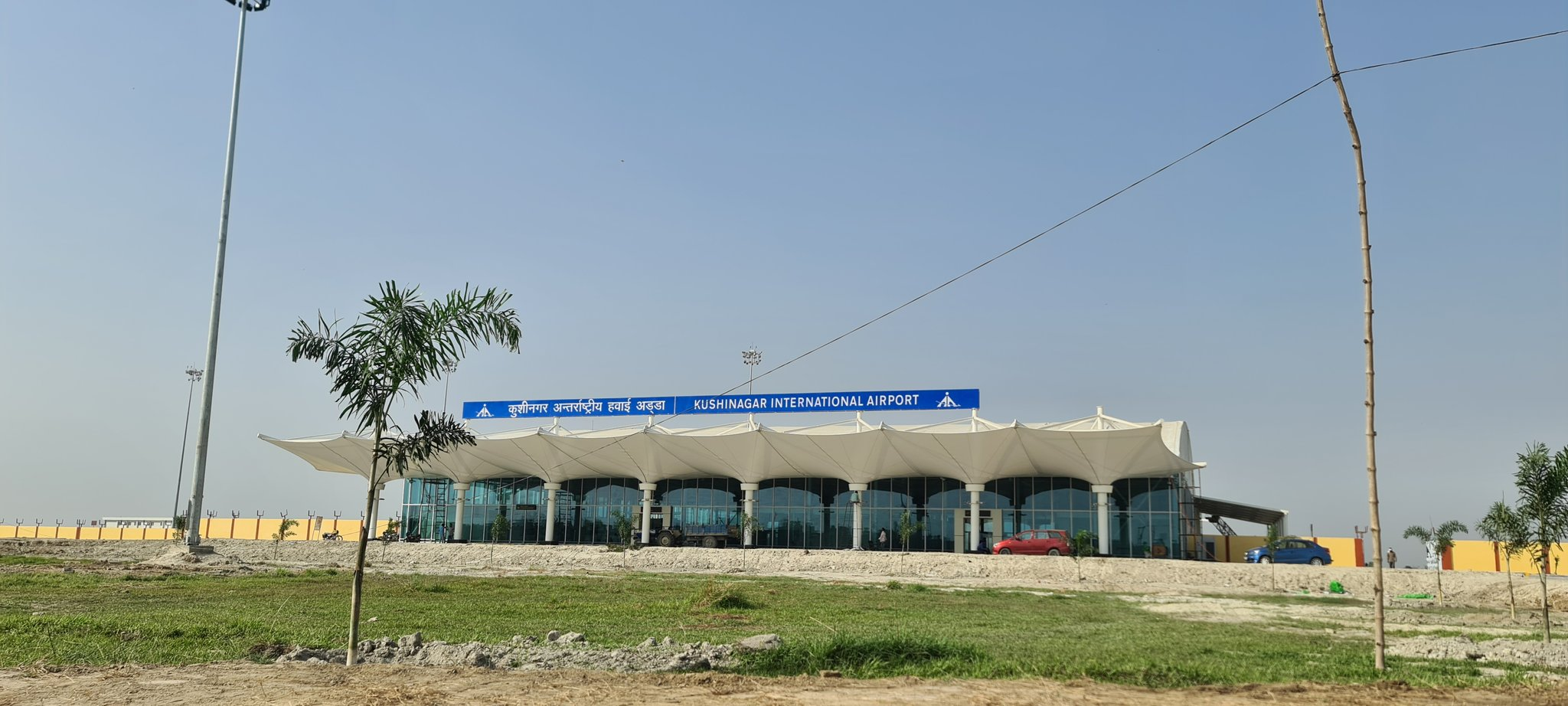
- IATA: KBK; ICAO: VEKI

Summary
- Airport type: Public
- Owner: Ministry of Civil Aviation
- Operator: Airports Authority of India
- Serves: Kushinagar
- Location: Kushinagar, Uttar Pradesh, India
- Opened: 20 October 2021; 4 years ago
- Elevation AMSL: 266 ft (81 m)
- Coordinates: 26°46′12″N 083°54′29″E

Map
- Location of the airport in Uttar Pradesh KBK/VEKI (India)

Runways
Direction	Length		Surface
Direction	ft	m	Surface
11/29	10,500	3,200	Asphalt

Statistics (April 2025 – March 2026)
- Passengers: 20 (▼ -92.6%)
- Aircraft movements: 6 (▼ -86.4%)
- Cargo tonnage: —
- Source: AAI

Kushinagar International Airport (IATA: KBK, ICAO: VEKI) is an international airport serving Kushinagar, Uttar Pradesh, India. In August 2021, the airport was licensed to operate as a customs notified airport, facilitating the movement of international passengers and Buddhist pilgrims.

The airport is closed since 2023 due to being commercially non-viable.

== History ==
The central government approved a Viability Gap Funding (VGF) of 20% for the construction of Kushinagar Airport in 2013. The airport was to be built through a joint venture between the State Government and the Airports Authority of India (AAI).

The project was initially intended to be developed on the public-private partnership model at an estimated cost of ₹ 354 crores. The State Government selected IL&FS Infrastructure Development Company Limited as project consultants. The design was inspired by inverted canopies called "Ulta Chaata". The Government had received 15 technical bids in 2013 from infrastructure companies for the development of the airport.

In January 2014, the state cabinet cleared the project and approved the financial bid document. Despite several attempts to reduce the cost and the size of the project, the government could not convince private payers about its viability. In May 2015, the state government decided to take the support of Airport Authority of India to move ahead with the project.

On 24 June 2020, Prime Minister Narendra Modi recognized the Kushinagar Airport as an international airport, in part to attract Buddhist pilgrims. In February 2021, the airport received all necessary clearances from the Directorate General of Civil Aviation (DGCA) to be recognized as the international airport, becoming the third international airport in Uttar Pradesh after Lucknow and Varanasi.

On 20 October 2021, PM Modi officially inaugurated the airport during Abhidhamma Day celebrations at Kushinagar, stating that it would boost the aviation sector and help increase international tourism from Buddhist pilgrims around the world. On that day, Sri Lanka's Minister for Youth and Sports Namal Rajapaksa and more than a hundred members of the Buddhist clergy landed at the inauguration of the airport as the first international flight landing. On 26 November 2021, the first passenger flight of SpiceJet landed at the airport from Delhi with 74 passengers, becoming the first scheduled flight to land at Kushinagar International Airport.

== Location ==
It is located 54 kilometres (34 mi) east of Gorakhpur Airport, 47 kilometres (29 mi) east of Gorakhpur, 34 kilometres (21 mi) north of Deoria, 60 kilometres (37 mi) south-west of Bettiah and 64 kilometres (40 mi) west of Gopalganj.

== Facilities ==
The airport has a single runway which is 3.2 km (10,000 ft) long and 45 m (148 ft) wide with number 11/29. The airport apron can accommodate 5 Boeing 737-900s at a time.

== Airlines and destinations ==
At present, this airport is equipped with all the necessary facilities, and the Instrument Landing System (ILS) has also been installed. However, the airport remains non-operational. Since November 2023, no scheduled commercial flights have operated from the airport, despite investments exceeding ₹327 crore and continued spending on maintenance.

== Statistics ==
Operations and statistics
Year	Passengers	Aircraft
2021-22	11,155	214
2022-23	23,221	334
2023-24	17,742	242
2024-25	270	44
2025-26	20	6

== See also ==
- List of airports in Uttar Pradesh
- UDAN Scheme
- Buddhist pilgrimage sites
- Tourism in Uttar Pradesh
