= Bareilly Airport =

Domestic airport in Bareilly, Uttar Pradesh, India

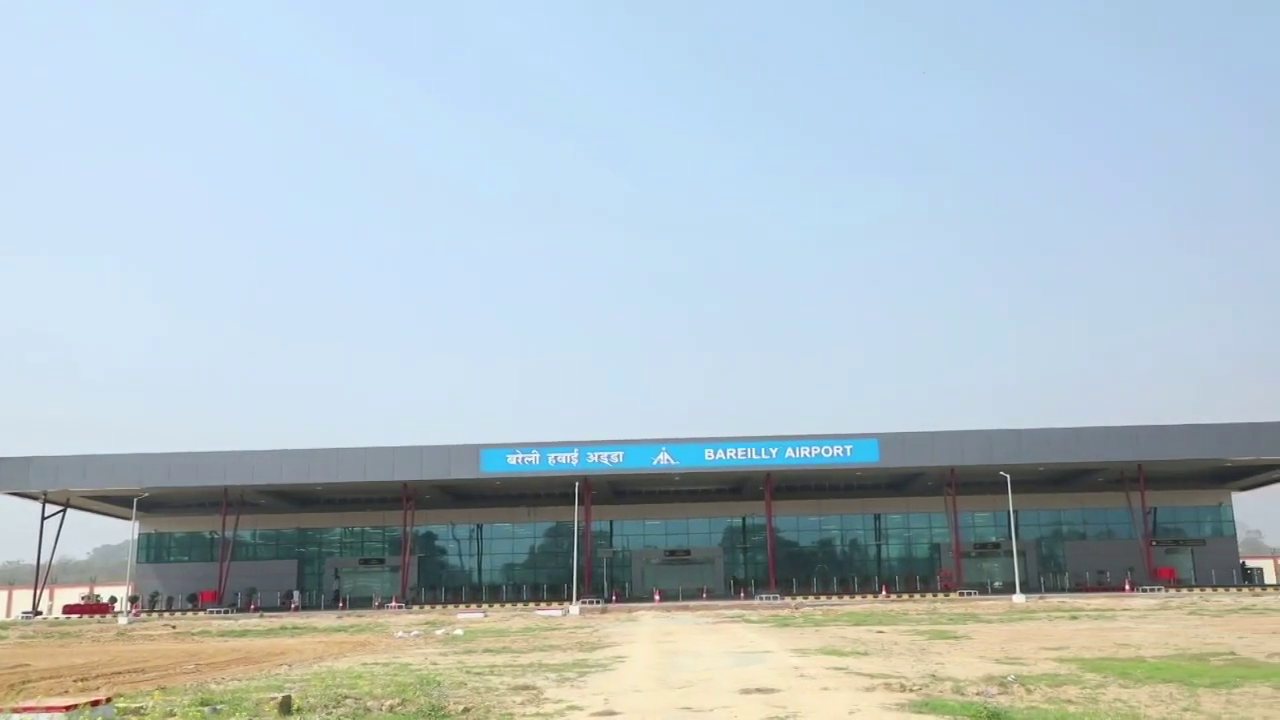
- IATA: BEK; ICAO: VIBY

Summary
- Airport type: Military/Public
- Owner: Indian Air Force
- Operator: Airports Authority of India
- Serves: Bareilly
- Location: Izzatnagar, Bareilly, Uttar Pradesh, India
- Opened: 8 March 2021; 5 years ago
- Elevation AMSL: 578 ft (176 m)
- Coordinates: 28°25′20″N 079°27′03″E

Map
- Location within Uttar Pradesh Location within India

Runways
Direction	Length		Surface
Direction	ft	m	Surface
11/29	10,400	3,170	Concrete/ Asphalt

Statistics (April 2025 - March 2026)
- Passengers: 1,27,937 (▲5.1%)
- Aircraft movements: 726 (▼12.3%)
- Cargo tonnage: 0 ( 0%)
- Source: AAI

Bareilly Airport (IATA: BEK, ICAO: VIBY) is a domestic airport serving Bareilly, Uttar Pradesh, India at Indian Air Force's Trishul Air Base in Izzatnagar, located 6 kilometres (3.7 mi) north from the city centre.

== History ==
The Airports Authority of India approved construction of a passenger terminal at the Trishul Air Force Base. The district administration bought 10 hectares (25 acres) of land from local farmers for the project. The AAI began the tender process to award construction contracts for the airport in September 2017, and expected the civil enclave to be ready by March 2018, pending the approval from the Government of Uttar Pradesh. However, the IAF requested changes in the layout of the taxiway connecting the terminal to the runway. After the Ministry of Defence approved the taxiway, passenger service was hoped to begin by February 2019. The job of developing the civil enclave was awarded to M/s SCC Infrastructure Pvt.Ltd. a construction company based at Ahmedabad, and the turn key engineering and design of the proposed structures was entrusted to M/s Solcon Consultants a design and engineering firm based at Vadodara, Gujarat.

== Terminals ==
=== Terminal 1 ===
The airport's first passenger terminal to begin commercial operations was inaugurated by the state civil aviation minister, Nand Gopal Nandi, and Union Minister, Santosh Gangwar, on 10 March 2019, at the air force base.

The terminal building covers an area of 2,500 square meters, and can handle 150 passengers (75 arrival, 75 departure) during peak hours. Its new apron, measuring 95×100 metres, provides parking space for two ATR-72 type aircraft at a time, as per IMG norms, and has a parking facility for, 250 cars.

=== Terminal 2 ===
A new terminal building, next to the first terminal towards north, was inaugurated on 8 March 2021, as part of the airport expansion project. It is spread over 3,020 square metres and has a capacity to accommodate over 300 passengers. It has two baggage conveyor belts and six check-in counters.The dimension of Link Taxiway will be 835 m x 18 m. The new apron for parking of three Airbus A321 type aircraft. (Note: Both the terminals have new apron for parking three Airbus A321 type aircraft.) The total cost of these works is around ₹ 70 crore.

== Trishul Air Force Base, Bareilly ==
Trishul Air Force Base, Bareilly, one of the Indian Air Force's largest, is a part of the Central Air Command. The base has a squadron of Sukhoi Su-30MKI fighters and a helicopter squadron of HAL Dhruv. It had Foxbat spyplanes capable of flying up to 80,000 feet (24,000 m). Its underground hangar is considered one of Asia's largest.

== Airlines and destinations ==
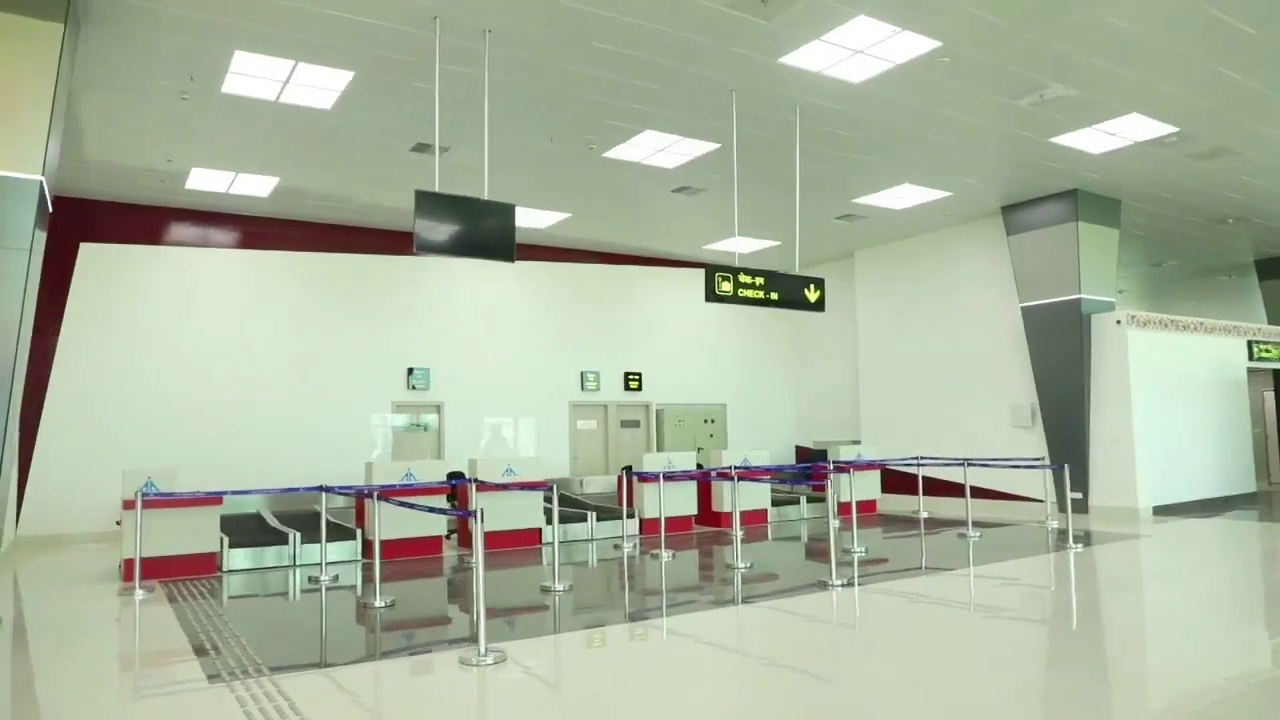
Check in counters

General sources:

Airlines	Destinations
IndiGo	Bengaluru, Delhi, Navi Mumbai, Noida

== Statistics ==
Annual passengers
Year	Passengers
2021-22	103,667
2022-23	142,102
2023-24	128,566
2024-25	121,746
2025-26	128,170

== See also ==
- Lal Bahadur Shastri Airport
- Chaudhary Charan Singh Airport
- Kanpur Airport
- Kushinagar International Airport
- Airports in India
- List of the busiest airports in India
