= Vuakmual Airport =

Vuakmual Airport Vuakmual Ṭumhmun
- IATA: None; ICAO: none

Summary
- Serves: Lunglei
- Location: Vuakmual

Vuakmual Airport is a greenfield airport to be built at Vuakmual, Lunglei district, Mizoram, India. It will serve Lunglei, the second largest town in the Indian state of Mizoram.

It will be utilised for both the Indian Armed Forces and civil aviation.

== See also ==
- Lengpui Airport
