= Shravasti Airport =

Domestic airport in Shravasti, Uttar Pradesh, India

- IATA: VSV; ICAO: VISV

Summary
- Airport type: Public
- Owner: Government of Uttar Pradesh
- Operator: Airports Authority of India
- Serves: Shravasti, Balrampur, Bahraich
- Location: Shravasti, Uttar Pradesh, India
- Opened: 10 March 2024
- Elevation AMSL: 366 ft (112 m)
- Coordinates: 27°30′11″N 082°01′37″E

Map
- Location of airport VSV (India)

Runways
Direction	Length		Surface
Direction	ft	m	Surface
12/30	5,019	1,530	Asphalt

Statistics (April 2025 – March 2026)
- Passengers: 0 (▼100%)
- Aircraft movements: 0 (▼100%)
- Cargo tonnage: —
- Source: AAI

Shravasti Airport (IATA: VSV, ICAO: VISV) is a domestic airport, which serves the city of Shravasti, Uttar Pradesh, India. It is near an important Buddhist pilgrimage site, where The Buddha is believed to have spent 24 monsoons in this city. Numerous stupas, monasteries and several temples near the archaeological site of Sahet-Mahet establish Buddha's association with Shravasti. The airport is being developed by upgrading the existing airfield, which was used only by the Government and VIPs, in three phases. It covers an area of 57 acres, and has a terminal building, an Air Traffic Control (ATC) tower, an apron for parking of two 19-seater Dornier 228 aircraft, a fire station and a runway.

The first phase is complete and was inaugurated by Narendra Modi on 10th March 2024. In the second and third phases, the airport will expand to an area of 750 acres. Under the UDAN scheme, flights to and from Shravasti and Lucknow is now operational, and in near future more flights to and from New Delhi Varanasi, Prayagraj and Kanpur will be started.

== Statistics ==
Monthly Passengers
Month	Passengers
July 2024	86
August 2024	114
September 2024	105
October 2024	109
November 2024	14
December 2024	14
