= Chitrakoot Dham =

City in Uttar Pradesh, India

- City
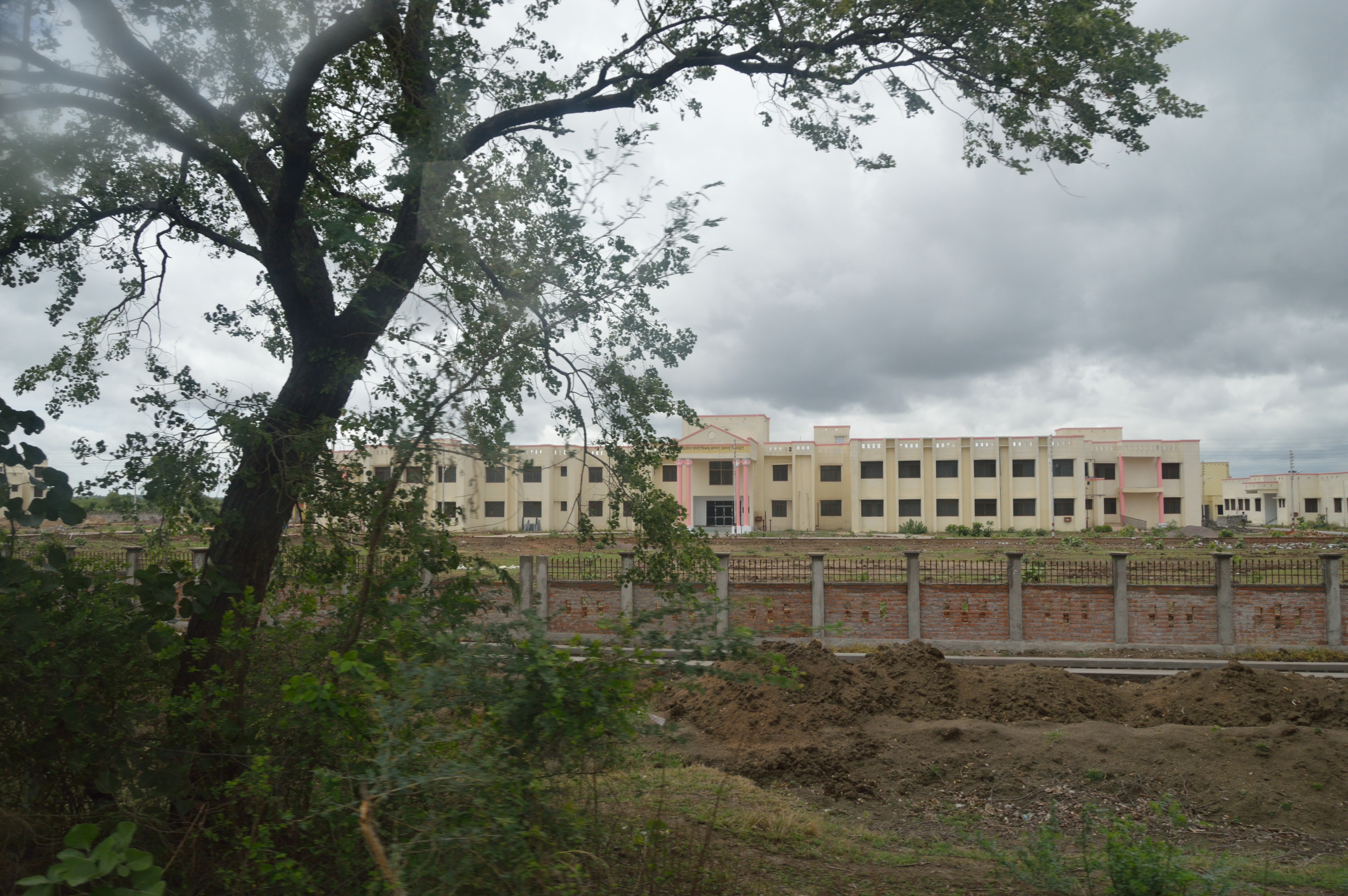
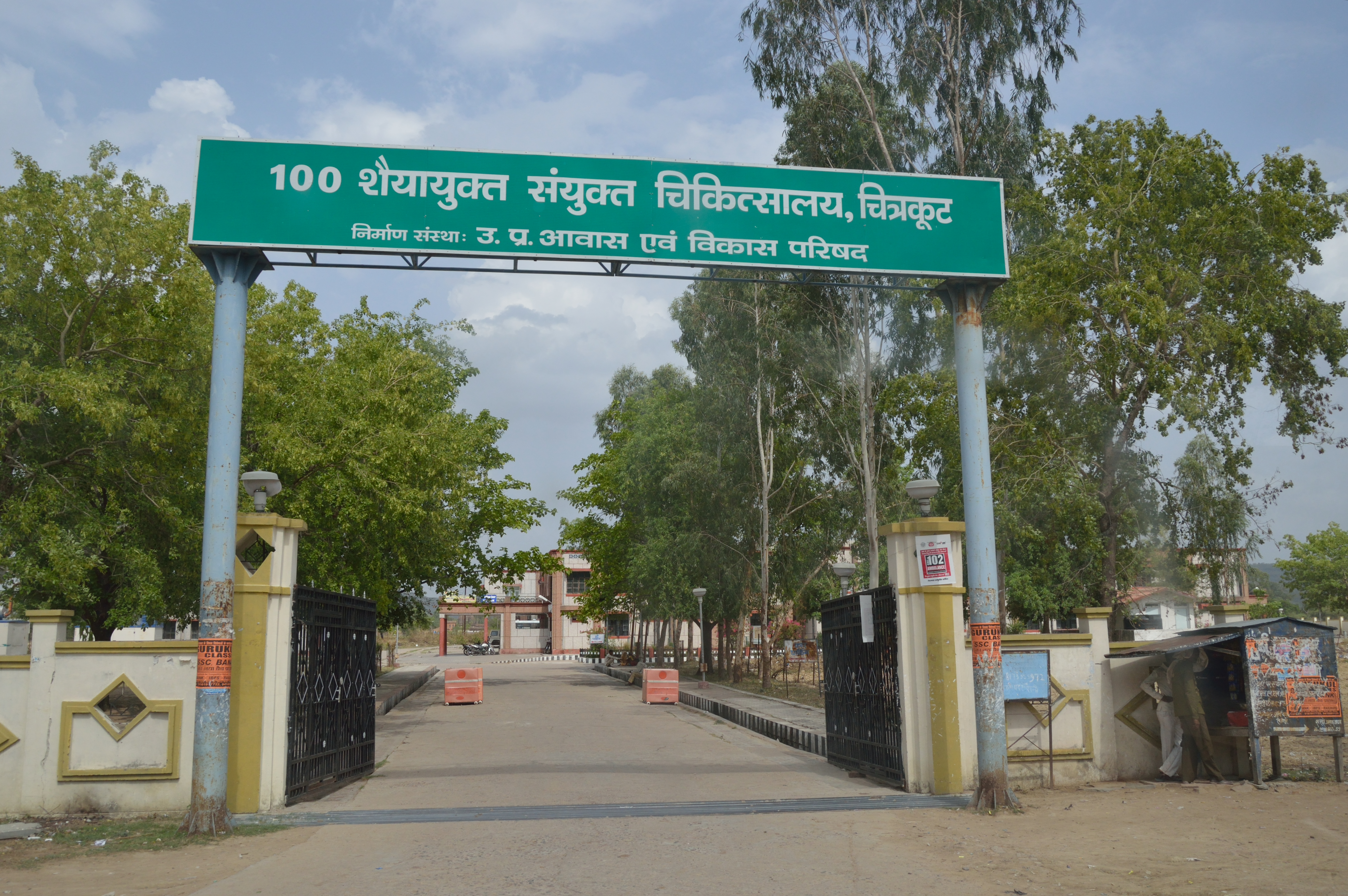
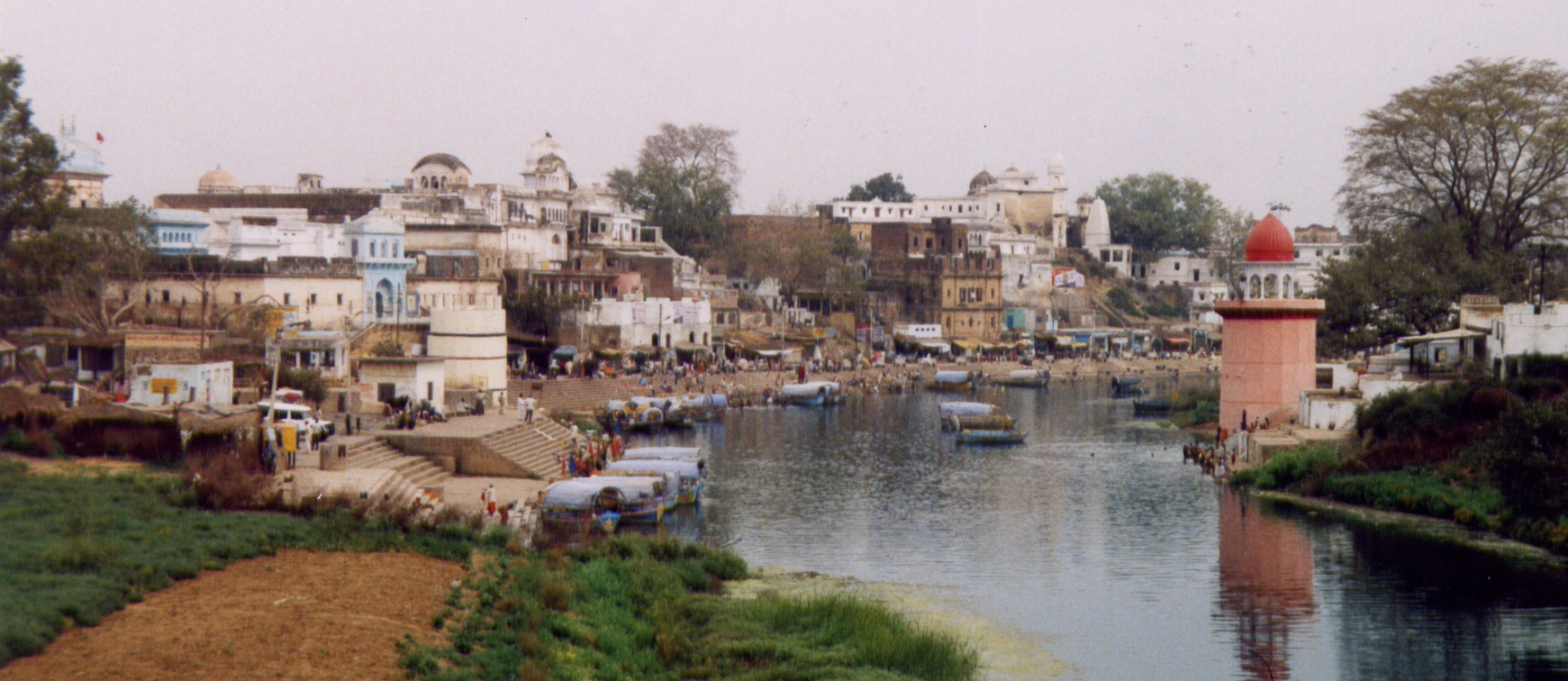
- Polytechnic college, Karwi, Ramghat at Chitrakoot (top); Hospital at Chitrakoot (bottom)
- Nickname: City of many Hills
- Location within Uttar Pradesh
- Coordinates: 25°12′50.322″N 80°55′3.883″E
- Country: India
- State: Uttar Pradesh
- District: Chitrakoot

Government
  - Body: Municipal Council
  - MLA: Anil Pradhan (Samajwadi Party)
  - Chairman: Narendra Gupta
- Elevation: 137 m (449 ft)
- Highest elevation: 700 m (2,300 ft)

Population (2011)
  - Total: 66,426
- Time zone: UTC+5:30 (IST)
- PIN: 210205
- +915198: +915198
- Vehicle registration: UP-96
- Website: https://chitrakoot.nic.in/

Chitrakoot Dham is a city in the Chitrakoot district, in the India state of Uttar Pradesh. It is the headquarters of the Chitrakoot district. Situated in the Baghelkhand region, it holds great cultural, historical, religious and archaeological importance and it is said that Rama, a major deity in Hinduism, spent 11 years of exile in Chitrakoot. It is connected to the town of Chitrakoot, situated in the Satna district of Madhya Pradesh.

== Geography ==
The city is bounded by Kaushambi in the north, Satna (M.P.) and Rewa (M.P.) in the south, Prayagraj and Banda in the east and west respectively. Chitrakoot Dham is situated on the bank of the Mandakini (Payaswini) river, with mountainous terrain.

== Demographics ==
As of the 2011 census, Chitrakoot Dham had a population of 66,426, with 54% being male, and 46% female. The city has an average literacy rate of 67%, with male literacy at 75% and female literacy of 58%.

== Educational institutes ==
- Baijnath Bharadwaj Saraswati Vidya Mandir
- Chitrakoot Inter College (CIC)
- Gyan Bharti School
- Jagadguru Rambhadracharya Handicapped University, Sitapur
- Sanskrit College, Taronha
- Goshwami Tulshidas Government College, Bedi Pulia
- Mahatma Gandhi Chitrakoot Gramodaya University
- Seth Moolchand Vidya Mandir
- St Thomas Sr. Sec. school

== Hospitals ==
- District Hospital Chitrakoot

== Transport ==
=== Roads ===
The National Highway 35 (NH35) and National Highway 731A (NH731A) runs through Chitrakoot Dham Karwi. NH35 gives connectivity to Varanasi and Jhansi. NH731A gives connectivity to Kausambi, Pratapgarah, and Raebareli. The Bundelkhand Expressway begins in the city, a 296 km long expressway, connected to the Agra–Lucknow Expressway, which connects to Delhi.

=== Railways ===
Chitrakutdham Karwi railway station is part of the Manikpur–Jhansi/Kanpur main line, served by the North-Central division of Indian Railways. It to Delhi, Mumbai, Kolkata, Bhopal, Raipur, Jabalpur, Kanpur, Khajuraho, Lucknow, Durg and Varanasi.

=== Airport ===
Chitrakoot Airport is the nearest airport to the city.
