= Amhat Airstrip =

Airport in India

Amhat Airstrip, Sultanpur अमहट हवाई पट्टी, सुल्तानपुर
- IATA: none; ICAO: VESL

Summary
- Airport type: Public
- Owner: Government of Uttar Pradesh
- Operator: Government of Uttar Pradesh
- Serves: Sultanpur
- Location: Sultanpur, Uttar Pradesh, India
- Elevation AMSL: 322 ft / 98 m
- Coordinates: 26°14′53″N 082°02′28″E

Map

Runways
Direction	Length		Surface
Direction	ft	m	Surface
11/29	5,400	1,646	Asphalt

Amhat Airstrip is an airstrip in Amhat near Sultanpur city in the Indian state of Uttar Pradesh. It had an aviation academy named Saraswati Aviation Academy, a private flight training school co-located with the airfield. After the COVID-19 pandemic in India, this Aviation Academy didn't renew its recognition which was ended on 30 July 2020.

== Airlines and destinations ==
The airport/airstrip has only unscheduled chartered flights.
