= Chitrakoot Airport =

Domestic airport in Uttar Pradesh, India

Chitrakoot Airport चित्रकूट एयरपोर्ट
- IATA: CWK; ICAO: VECT

Summary
- Airport type: Public
- Owner: Government of Uttar Pradesh
- Operator: Airports Authority of India
- Serves: Chitrakoot
- Location: Dewanga, Chitrakoot district, Uttar Pradesh, India
- Opened: 2024; 2 years ago
- Elevation AMSL: 1,050 ft (320 m)
- Coordinates: 25.167694°N 80.935800°E

Map
- Location of airport in Uttar Pradesh CWK (India)

Runways
Direction	Length		Surface
Direction	ft	m	Surface
06/24	4,593	1,400	Asphalt
	8,202	2,500	Under construction

Statistics (April 2025 – March 2026)
- Passengers: 141 (▼ -88.3%)
- Aircraft movements: 38 (▼ -81.2%)
- Cargo tonnage: —
- Source: AAI

Chitrakoot Airport (IATA: CWK, ICAO: VECT) is an operational domestic airport which serves the city of Chitrakoot, Uttar Pradesh, India. It is located at Dewangna in Chitrakoot district, 12 km (7.5 mi) from the city center. The existing airstrip with a runway is currently owned by the Civil Aviation Department of the Government of Uttar Pradesh. In January 2019, the State Government decided to expand the airstrip and construct an airport terminal by acquiring additional land from the forest department. The airport has a pre-fabricated passenger terminal covering 525 square meters and can accommodate 20 arriving and 20 departing passengers. In October 2020, Gurugram-based Aviation Connectivity and Infrastructure Developers Pvt Ltd won the rights to operate flights from the airport to Kanpur, Prayagraj and Varanasi, under the government's UDAN Regional Connectivity Scheme. Currently, the airport is not operational, and the terminal is being handled only for private operations. To make it a full-fledged commercial airport, it is undergoing expansion, which includes a new 2,500-metre runway, suitable for handling Airbus A320 and Boeing 737 type aircraft, an apron, and a new passenger terminal.

== Statistics ==
Monthly Passengers
Month	Passengers
July 2024	115
August 2024	173
September 2024	215
October 2024	219
November 2024	76
December 2024	12
