= Azamgarh Airport =

Upcoming domestic airport in Azamgarh, Uttar Pradesh, India

- IATA: AZH; ICAO: VEAH

Summary
- Airport type: Public
- Owner: Government of Uttar Pradesh
- Operator: Government of Uttar Pradesh
- Serves: Azamgarh
- Location: Manduri, Azamgarh
- Opened: 2024; 2 years ago
- Elevation AMSL: 250 ft (76 m)
- Coordinates: 26°09′12″N 83°07′06″E

Map
- Location of the airport AZH (India)

Runways
Direction	Length		Surface
Direction	ft	m	Surface
14/32	5,400	1,646	Asphalt

Statistics (April 2025 – March 2026)
- Passengers: 0 (▼ -100%)
- Aircraft movements: 0 (▼ -100%)
- Cargo tonnage: —
- Source: AAI

Azamgarh Airport (IATA: AZH, ICAO: VEAH) is a domestic airport at Manduri village outside Azamgarh city, near Kuan Devchand Patti, in the Indian state of Uttar Pradesh. It is being developed by upgrading the existing government airstrip. The existing airstrip can support aircraft weighing up to 5,700 kg (12,600 lb) with a runway of 1,400 by 23 metres (4,593 by 75 ft).

== Statistics ==
Monthly Passengers
Month	Passengers
July 2024	103
August 2024	139
September 2024	160
October 2024	125
November 2024	29
December 2024	0

== See also ==
- UDAN
- Airports Authority of India
