= Kanpur Airport =

Domestic airport in Kanpur, Uttar Pradesh, India

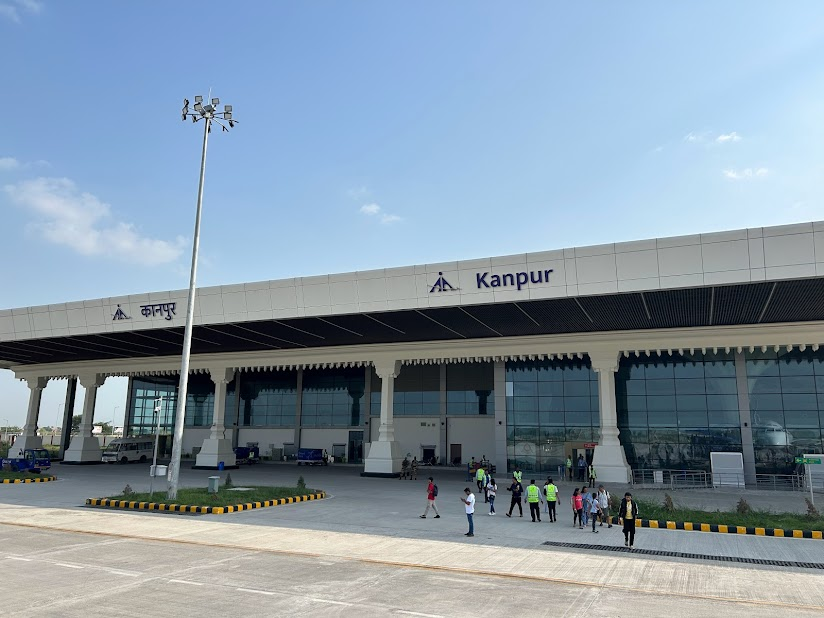
- IATA: KNU; ICAO: VECX

Summary
- Airport type: Public/Military
- Owner: Airports Authority of India
- Operator: Airports Authority of India
- Serves: Kanpur
- Location: Chakeri, Kanpur, Uttar Pradesh, India
- Elevation AMSL: 410 ft (120 m)
- Coordinates: 26.3994624°N 80.4269499°E

Map
- Location within Uttar Pradesh Location within India

Runways
Direction	Length		Surface
Direction	ft	m	Surface
09/27	8,325	2,536	Asphalt

Statistics (April 2025 - March 2026)
- Passengers: 3,63,944 (▲12.9%)
- Aircraft movements: 2,456 (▲11.1%)
- Cargo tonnage: 179.4 (▲54.4%)
- Source: AAI

Kanpur Airport (IATA: KNU, ICAO: VECX) is a domestic airport and an Indian Air Force station that serves the city of Kanpur in Uttar Pradesh, India. It is located at Chakeri, about 17 km (11 mi) from the city centre, and operates from a new civil terminal. It provides connectivity to major tourist and historical attractions in the area such as Bithoor, Sankissa, Etawah Safari Park, Kalinjar Fort, Kalpi, National Chambal Sanctuary, Bhitargaon and Kannauj.

== Infrastructure ==
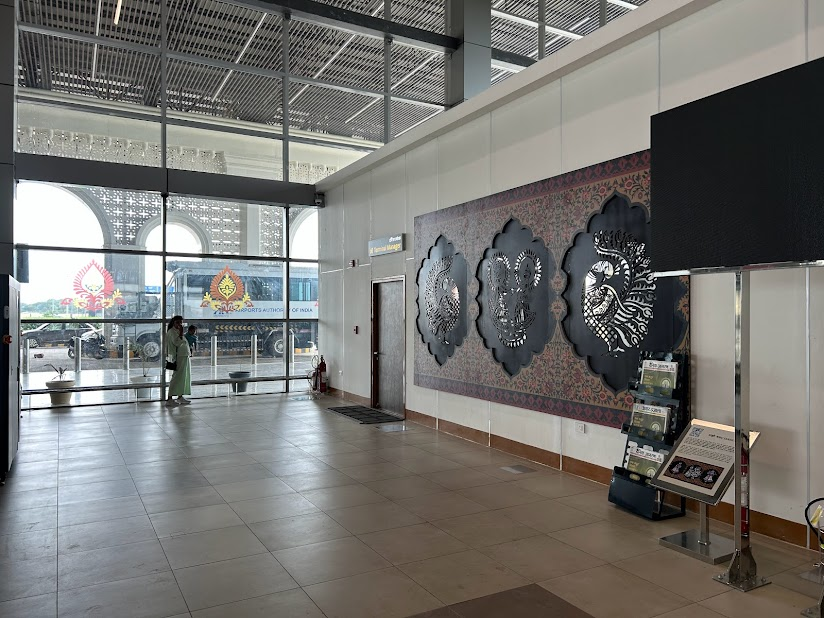
Kanpur Airport

The previous terminal at Kanpur Airport had limited expansion options available and was subject to restrictions enforced by the Airports Authority of India due to a strong military presence. It was too small to handle the increasing traffic into Kanpur and projected future demand. Therefore, a new terminal spread over 6,200 m². has been constructed near the threshold of the eastern end of the runway and to NH-19 through a new approach road.

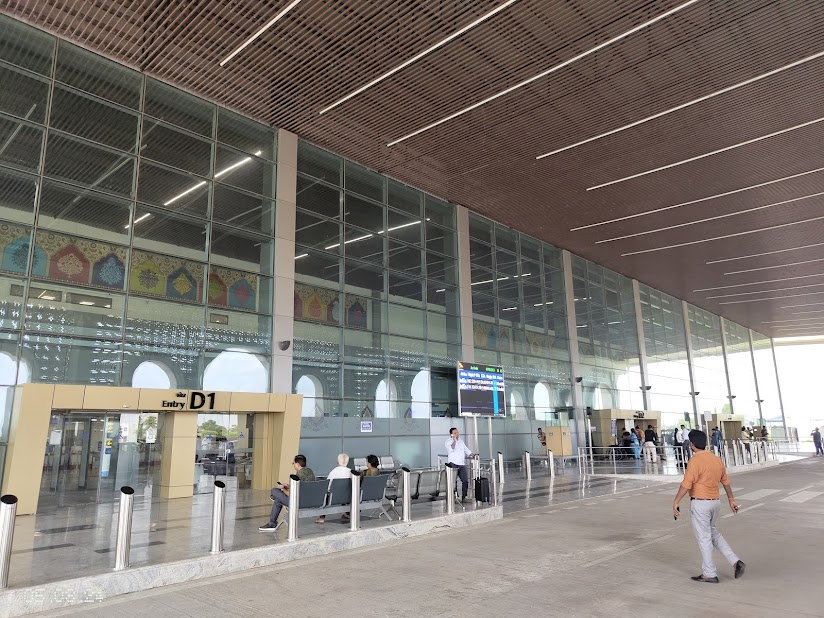
Kanpur Airport

The new terminal comprises six hangars and a waiting room for 400 passengers, eight check-in desks, and four-lane approach roads to the nearby highway and to the outer ring road. It was inaugurated by the Chief Minister of Uttar Pradesh, Yogi Adityanath, the Minister of Civil Aviation, Jyotiraditya Scindia and the State Civil Aviation Minister, Nand Gopal Nandi, along with others in a ceremony at the airport on 26 May 2023. Flights from the new terminal began on 7 June 2023.

It has been proposed to rename the airport the Ganesh Shankar Vidyarthi Airport after Ganesh Shankar Vidyarthi.

== Base Repair Depot, IAF ==
The Kanpur Airport hosts 1 Base Repair Depot and 4 Base Repair Depot under the Maintenance Command of the Indian Air Force. The 1 BRD overhauls Antonov An-32 transport aircraft fleet while 4 BRD previously used to overhaul the R-29 engines of MiG-23 and MiG-27 and currently the M53 P2 engines of Mirage 2000. The airport also hosts the Transport Aircraft Division (TAD) of Hindustan Aeronautics Limited (HAL) which previously produced HS 748 Avro and currently manufactures Dornier 228 for Indian Armed Forces as well as commercial market.

== Airlines and destinations ==
Airlines	Destinations
IndiGo	Bengaluru, Delhi, Hyderabad, Mumbai-Shivaji

== Statistics ==
It was the 5th most profitable airport in India in the year 2020–21.

== See also ==
- List of airports in Uttar Pradesh
