= List of airports in India =

India has more than 450 airports and airstrips. This list includes civilian airports recognized by the Directorate General of Civil Aviation. As of June 2026, there are 36 international and 11 limited international airports apart from other domestic and private airports.

== Classification ==
This list contains the following information:

1. Area served – Town or city where the airport is located
2. IATA – The three letter airport code assigned by the International Air Transport Association
3. ICAO – The four letter airport code assigned by the International Civil Aviation Organization. ICAO codes for India start with:
  1. VAXX: West Zone - Mumbai Centre
  2. VEXX: East Zone - Kolkata Centre
  3. VIXX: North Zone - Delhi Centre
  4. VOXX: South Zone - Chennai Centre
4. Operational – Functional status of the airport
5. Owned/operated by – Authority owning or operating the airport
6. Airport type – Type of airport as per terminology used by Airports Authority of India listed below:

Airport type	Description
International	Airport that handles both international and domestic traffic.
International (CE)	A civil enclave airport primarily used by the Indian Armed Forces, but has separate commercial terminal(s) to handle international and domestic traffic.
Customs	Airport with customs checking and clearance facility, and handles domestic traffic. A very limited number of international flights also operate from some of these customs airports for limited periods of time.
Domestic	Airport that handles only domestic traffic.
Domestic (CE)	A civil enclave airport primarily used by the Indian Armed Forces, but has separate commercial terminal(s) to handle domestic traffic.
State/Private	An airport under the control of state governments and/or private entities.

Airports in India
- International airport
- Customs airport
- Domestic airport

== List by state ==
Source: Airports Authority of India, Directorate General of Civil Aviation

=== Andhra Pradesh ===
Area served	Airport name	IATA	ICAO	Airport type	Operational	Owned/operated by
Donakonda	Donakonda Airport		VODK	Domestic	No	AAI
Kadapa	Kadapa Airport	CDP	VOCP	Domestic	Yes	AAI
Kurnool	Kurnool Airport	KJB	VOKU	State/Private	Yes	APADCL
Puttaparthi	Sri Sathya Sai Airport	PUT	VOPN	State/Private	Yes	Sri Sathya Sai Central Trust
Rajamahendravaram	Rajahmundry Airport	RJA	VORY	Domestic	Yes	AAI
Tirupati	Tirupati Airport	TIR	VOTP	International	Yes	AAI
Vijayawada	Vijayawada Airport	VGA	VOBZ	International	Yes	AAI
Visakhapatnam	Alluri Sitarama Raju International Airport	VTZ	VOVI	International	Yes	APADCL/GMR Group
Visakhapatnam	INS Dega		VOVZ	Customs	Yes	Indian Navy

=== Arunachal Pradesh ===
Area served	Airport name	IATA	ICAO	Airport type	Operational	Owned/operated by
Daporijo	Daporijo Airport	DEP	VEDZ	Domestic	No	AAI
Itanagar	Donyi Polo Airport	HGI	VEHO	Domestic	Yes	AAI
Pasighat	Pasighat Airport	IXT	VEPG	State/Private	Yes	Government of Arunachal Pradesh
Tezu	Tezu Airport	TEI	VETJ	Domestic	Yes	Government of Arunachal Pradesh
Ziro	Ziro Airport	ZER	VEZO	State/Private	Yes	Government of Arunachal Pradesh

=== Assam ===
Area served	Airport name	IATA	ICAO	Airport type	Operational	Owned/operated by
Dhubri	Rupsi Airport	RUP	VERU	Domestic	Yes	AAI
Dibrugarh	Dibrugarh Airport	DIB	VEMN	Domestic	Yes	AAI
Guwahati	Lokpriya Gopinath Bordoloi International Airport	GAU	VEGT	International	Yes	Adani Group
Jorhat	Jorhat Airport	JRH	VEJT	Domestic (CE)	Yes	MoD and AAI
North Lakhimpur	Lilabari Airport	IXI	VELR	Domestic	Yes	AAI
Silchar	Silchar Airport	IXS	VEKU	Domestic (CE)	Yes	MoD and AAI
Tezpur	Tezpur Airport	TEZ	VETZ	Domestic (CE)	Yes	MoD and AAI

=== Bihar ===
Area served	Airport name	IATA	ICAO	Airport type	Operational	Owned/operated by
Darbhanga	Darbhanga Airport	DBR	VEDH	Domestic (CE)	Yes	MoD and AAI
Forbesganj	Forbesganj Airport			Domestic	No	AAI
Gaya	Gaya Airport	GAY	VEGY	Customs	Yes	AAI
Munger	Munger Airport		VAMG	State/Private	No	Government of Bihar
Muzaffarpur	Muzaffarpur Airport	MZU	VEMZ	State/Private	No	Government of Bihar
Patna	Jay Prakash Narayan Airport	PAT	VEPT	Customs	Yes	AAI
Purnia	Purnia Airport	PXN	VEPU	Domestic (CE)	Yes	MoD and AAI
Raxaul	Raxaul Airport		VERL	State/Private	No	Government of Bihar

=== Chhattisgarh ===
Area served	Airport name	IATA	ICAO	Airport type	Operational	Owned/operated by
Ambikapur	Ambikapur Airport	AHA	VEAP	State/Private	Yes	Government of Chhattisgarh
Bilaspur	Bilasa Devi Kevat Airport	PAB	VEBU	State/Private	Yes	Government of Chhattisgarh
Jagdalpur	Jagdalpur Airport	JGB	VEJR	State/Private	Yes	Government of Chhattisgarh
Raigarh	Raigarh Airport		VERH	State/Private	Yes	Jindal Steel and Power
Raipur	Swami Vivekananda Airport	RPR	VERP	Domestic	Yes	AAI

=== Goa ===
Area served	Airport name	IATA	ICAO	Airport type	Operational	Owned/operated by
Dabolim	Dabolim Airport	GOI	VOGO	International (CE)	Yes	MoD and AAI
Mopa	Manohar International Airport	GOX	VOGA	International	Yes	GMR Group

=== Gujarat ===
Area served	Airport name	IATA	ICAO	Airport type	Operational	Owned/operated by
Ahmedabad	Sardar Vallabhbhai Patel International Airport	AMD	VAAH	International	Yes	Adani Group
Bhavnagar	Bhavnagar Airport	BHU	VABV	Domestic	Yes	AAI
Bhuj	Bhuj Airport	BHJ	VABJ	Domestic (CE)	Yes	MoD and AAI
Deesa	Deesa Airport		VADS	Domestic	No	AAI
Dwarka	Mithapur Airstrip		IN-0106	State/Private	No	Government of Gujarat
Jamnagar	Jamnagar Airport	JGA	VAJM	Domestic (CE)	Yes	MoD and AAI
Junagadh	Keshod Airport	IXK	VAKS	Domestic	Yes	AAI
Kandla	Kandla Airport	IXY	VAKE	Domestic	Yes	AAI
Mundra	Mundra Airport	MDA	VAMA	State/Private	Yes	Adani Group
Porbandar	Porbandar Airport	PBD	VAPR	Domestic	Yes	AAI
Rajkot	Rajkot International Airport	HSR	VAHS	International	Yes	AAI
Rajkot	Rajkot Airport	RAJ	VARK	Domestic	No	AAI
Surat	Surat International Airport	STV	VASU	International	Yes	AAI
Vadodara	Vadodara Airport	BDQ	VABO	Customs	Yes	AAI

=== Haryana ===
Area served	Airport name	IATA	ICAO	Airport type	Operational	Owned/operated by
Ambala	Ambala Airport	AMI	VIAM	Domestic (CE)	No	MoD and AAI
Hisar	Hisar Airport	HSS	VIHR	State/Private	Yes	Civil Aviation Department, Haryana

=== Himachal Pradesh ===
Area served	Airport name	IATA	ICAO	Airport type	Operational	Owned/operated by
Kangra	Kangra Airport	DHM	VIGG	Domestic	Yes	AAI
Kullu-Manali	Kullu–Manali Airport	KUU	VIBR	Domestic	Yes	AAI
Shimla	Shimla Airport	SLV	VISM	Domestic	Yes	AAI

=== Jharkhand ===
Area served	Airport name	IATA	ICAO	Airport type	Operational	Owned/operated by
Bokaro	Bokaro Airport		VEBK	State/Private	No	Steel Authority of India
Deoghar	Deoghar Airport	DGH	VEDO	Domestic	Yes	AAI and Government of Jharkhand
Dumka	Dumka Airport	DGH	VEDK	State/Private	No	Government of Jharkhand
Jamshedpur	Chakulia Airport		VECK	Domestic	No	AAI
Jamshedpur	Sonari Airport	IXW	VEJS	State/Private	Yes	Tata Steel
Jamshedpur	Dhalbhumgarh Airport			Domestic	No	AAI and Government of Jharkhand
Ranchi	Birsa Munda Airport	IXR	VERC	Domestic	Yes	AAI

=== Karnataka ===
Area served	Airport name	IATA	ICAO	Airport type	Operational	Owned/operated by
Belagavi	Belagavi Airport	IXG	VOBM	Domestic	Yes	AAI
Ballari	Jindal Vijaynagar Airport	VDY	VOJV	State/Private	Yes	Jindal Steel and Power
Bengaluru	HAL Airport		VOBG	State/Private	Yes	Hindustan Aeronautics Limited
Bengaluru	Kempegowda International Airport	BLR	VOBL	International	Yes	BIAL
Bidar	Bidar Airport	IXX	VOBR	State/Private	Yes	MoD and GMR Group
Hubli	Hubli Airport	HBX	VOHB	Domestic	Yes	AAI
Kalaburagi	Kalaburagi Airport	GBI	VOGB	Domestic	Yes	AAI
Koppal	Baldota Airport		VOKP	State/Private	Yes	MSPL
Mangaluru	Mangaluru International Airport	IXE	VOML	International	Yes	AAI and Adani Group
Mysuru	Mysuru Airport	MYQ	VOMY	Domestic	Yes	AAI
Shivamogga	Rashtrakavi Kuvempu Airport	RQY	VOSH	State/Private	Yes	Government of Karnataka

=== Kerala ===
Area served	Airport name	IATA	ICAO	Airport type	Operational	Owned/operated by
Kannur	Kannur International Airport	CNN	VOKN	International	Yes	KIAL
Kochi	Cochin International Airport	COK	VOCI	International	Yes	CIAL
Kozhikode	Kozhikode International Airport	CCJ	VOCL	International	Yes	AAI
Thiruvananthapuram	Thiruvananthapuram International Airport	TRV	VOTV	International	Yes	Adani Group

=== Madhya Pradesh ===
Area served	Airport name	IATA	ICAO	Airport type	Operational	Owned/operated by
Bhopal	Raja Bhoj Airport	BHO	VABP	Customs	Yes	AAI
Gwalior	Rajmata Vijaya Raje Scindia Airport	GWL	VIGR	Domestic (CE)	Yes	MoD and AAI
Datia	Datia Airport	DPP	VIDT	State/Private	Yes	Government of Madhya Pradesh
Indore	Devi Ahilyabai Holkar Airport	IDR	VAID	Customs	Yes	AAI
Jabalpur	Jabalpur Airport	JLR	VAJB	Domestic	Yes	AAI
Khajuraho	Khajuraho Airport	HJR	VAKJ	Domestic	Yes	AAI
Rewa	Rewa Airport	REW	VA1G	Domestic	Yes	AAI
Khandwa	Khandwa Airport		VAKD	Domestic	No	AAI
Nagda	Birlagram Airport		VA1C	State/Private	Yes	Grasim Industries
Panna	Panna Airport			Domestic	No	AAI
Satna	Satna Airport	TNI	VEST	Domestic	Yes	AAI

=== Maharashtra ===
Area served	Airport name	IATA	ICAO	Airport type	Operational	Owned/operated by
Akola	Akola Airport	AKD	VAAK	Domestic	No	AAI
Amravati	Amravati Airport	AVR	VAAM	State/Private	Yes	MADC
Aurangabad	Aurangabad Airport	IXU	VAAU	Customs	Yes	AAI
Baramati	Baramati Airport		IN-0024	State/Private	No	Government of Maharashtra
Gondia	Gondia Airport	GDB	VAGD	Domestic	Yes	AAI
Jalgaon	Jalgaon Airport	JLG	VAJL	Domestic	Yes	AAI
Kolhapur	Kolhapur Airport	KLH	VAKP	Domestic	Yes	AAI
Latur	Latur Airport	LTU	VOLT	State/Private	No	Government of Maharashtra
Mumbai	Chhatrapati Shivaji Maharaj International Airport	BOM	VABB	International	Yes	MIAL
Mumbai	Juhu Aerodrome		VAJJ	Domestic	Yes	AAI
Nagpur	Dr. Babasaheb Ambedkar International Airport	NAG	VANP	International	Yes	AAI, GMR Group, and MADC
Nanded	Shri Guru Gobind Singh Ji Airport	NDC	VAND	State/Private	Yes	MADC
Nashik	Nashik Airport	ISK	VAOZ	State/Private	Yes	Hindustan Aeronautics Limited
Navi Mumbai	Navi Mumbai International Airport	NMI	VANM	International	Yes	NMIAL
Osmanabad	Osmanabad Airport			State/Private	No	Government of Maharashtra
Pune	Pune Airport	PNQ	VAPO	Customs	Yes	MoD and AAI
Shirdi	Shirdi Airport	SAG	VASD	International	Yes	MADC
Solapur	Solapur Airport	SSE	VASL	Domestic	Yes	AAI
Sindhudurg	Sindhudurg Airport	SDW	VOSR	State/Private	Yes	Government of Maharashtra
Yavatmal	Sant Gadge Baba Yavatmal Airport		VA78	State/Private	No	Government of Maharashtra

=== Manipur ===
Area served	Airport name	IATA	ICAO	Airport type	Operational	Owned/operated by
Imphal	Bir Tikendrajit International Airport	IMF	VEIM	International	Yes	AAI

=== Meghalaya ===
Area served	Airport name	IATA	ICAO	Airport type	Operational	Owned/operated by
Shillong	Shillong Airport	SHL	VEBI	Domestic	Yes	AAI
Shella	Shella Airport			Domestic	No	AAI

=== Mizoram ===
Area served	Airport name	IATA	ICAO	Airport type	Operational	Owned/operated by
Aizawl	Turial Airport		VEAZ	Domestic	No	AAI
Aizawl	Lengpui Airport	AJL	VELP	State/Private	Yes	Government of Mizoram

=== Nagaland ===
Area served	Airport name	IATA	ICAO	Airport type	Operational	Owned/operated by
Dimapur	Dimapur Airport	DMU	VEMR	Domestic	Yes	AAI

=== Odisha ===
Area served	Airport name	IATA	ICAO	Airport type	Operational	Owned/operated by
Angul	Savitri Jindal Airport		VEAL	State/Private	Yes	Jindal Steel and Power
Berhampur	Berhampur Airport	QBM	VEBM	State/Private	No	Government of Odisha
Bhubaneswar	Biju Patnaik Airport	BBI	VEBS	International	Yes	AAI
Jeypore	Jeypore Airport	PYB	VEJP	State/Private	Yes	Government of Odisha
Jharsuguda	Veer Surendra Sai Airport	JRG	VEJH	Domestic	Yes	AAI
Padmapur	Satibhata Airstrip		VEPP	State/Private	No	Government of Odisha
Rourkela	Rourkela Airport	RRK	VERK	State/Private	Yes	Steel Authority of India
Utkela	Utkela Airport	UKE	VEUK	State/Private	Yes	Government of Odisha

=== Punjab ===
Area served	Airport name	IATA	ICAO	Airport type	Operational	Owned/operated by
Amritsar	Beas Airport		VIBS	State/Private	Yes	Beas Spectruin Aero
Amritsar	Sri Guru Ram Dass Jee International Airport	ATQ	VIAR	International	Yes	AAI
Bathinda	Bathinda Airport	BUP	VIBT	Domestic (CE)	Yes	MoD and AAI
Jalandhar	Sri Guru Ravidas Airport	AIP	VIAX	Domestic (CE)	Yes	MoD and AAI
Ludhiana	Halwara Airport	HWR	VIHX	Domestic (CE)	Yes	MoD and AAI
Ludhiana	Ludhiana Airport	LUH	VILD	Domestic	Yes	Government of Punjab and AAI
Pathankot	Pathankot Airport	IXP	VIPK	Domestic (CE)	No	MoD and AAI

=== Rajasthan ===
Area served	Airport name	IATA	ICAO	Airport type	Operational	Owned/operated by
Ajmer	Kishangarh Airport	KQH	VIKG	Domestic	Yes	AAI
Banasthali	Banasthali Airstrip			State/Private	Yes	Banasthali Vidyapith
Bikaner	Bikaner Airport	BKB	VIBK	Domestic (CE)	Yes	MoD and AAI
Jaipur	Jaipur International Airport	JAI	VIJP	International	Yes	Adani Group
Jaisalmer	Jaisalmer Airport	JSA	VIJR	Domestic (CE)	Yes	MoD and AAI
Jodhpur	Jodhpur Airport	JDH	VIJO	Domestic (CE)	Yes	MoD and AAI
Kankroli	Kankroli Airstrip			State/Private	Yes	J. K. Organisation
Kota	Kota Airport	KTU	VIKO	Domestic	Yes	AAI
Udaipur	Maharana Pratap Airport	UDR	VAUD	Domestic	Yes	AAI

=== Sikkim ===
Area served	Airport name	IATA	ICAO	Airport type	Operational	Owned/operated by
Gangtok	Pakyong Airport	PYG	VEPY	Domestic	Yes	AAI

=== Tamil Nadu ===
Area served	Airport name	IATA	ICAO	Airport type	Operational	Owned/operated by
Chennai	Chennai International Airport	MAA	VOMM	International	Yes	AAI
Coimbatore	Coimbatore International Airport	CJB	VOCB	International	Yes	AAI
Hosur	Hosur Aerodrome		VO95	State/Private	Yes	TAAL
Madurai	Madurai International Airport	IXM	VOMD	International	Yes	AAI
Neyveli	Neyveli Airport	NVY	VONY	State/Private	No	Neyveli Lignite Corporation
Salem	Salem Airport	SXV	VOSM	Domestic	Yes	AAI
Thanjavur	Thanjavur Airport	TJV	VOTJ	Domestic (CE)	No	MoD and AAI
Thoothukkudi	Thoothukudi Airport	TCR	VOTK	Domestic	Yes	AAI
Tiruchirappalli	Tiruchirappalli International Airport	TRZ	VOTR	International	Yes	AAI
Vellore	Vellore Airport		VOVR	Domestic	No	AAI

=== Telangana ===
Area served	Airport name	IATA	ICAO	Airport type	Operational	Owned/operated by
Hyderabad	Begumpet Airport	BPM	VOHY	Domestic	Yes	AAI
Hyderabad	Nadirgul Airport			Domestic	No	AAI
Hyderabad	Rajiv Gandhi International Airport	HYD	VOHS	International	Yes	GMR HIAL
Warangal	Warangal Airport	WGC	VOWA	Domestic	No	AAI

=== Tripura ===
Area served	Airport name	IATA	ICAO	Airport type	Operational	Owned/operated by
Agartala	Maharaja Bir Bikram Airport	IXA	VEAT	Customs	Yes	AAI
Kailashahar	Kailashahar Airport	IXH	VEKR	Domestic	No	AAI
Kamalpur	Kamalpur Airport	IXQ	VEKN	Domestic	No	AAI
Khowai	Khowai Airport	IXN	VEKW	Domestic	No	AAI

=== Uttar Pradesh ===
Area served	Airport name	IATA	ICAO	Airport type	Operational	Owned/operated by
Agra	Agra Airport	AGR	VIAG	Domestic (CE)	Yes	MoD and AAI
Amethi	Fursatganj Airfield		VERB	State/Private	No	Ministry of Civil Aviation
Aligarh	Aligarh Airport	HRH	VIAH	State/Private	Yes	Government of Uttar Pradesh and AAI
Ayodhya	Maharishi Valmiki International Airport	AYJ	VEAY	International	Yes	AAI
Azamgarh	Azamgarh Airport	AZH	VEAH	State/Private	Yes	Government of Uttar Pradesh and AAI
Bareilly	Bareilly Airport	BEK	VIBY	Domestic (CE)	Yes	MoD and AAI
Chitrakoot	Chitrakoot Airport	CWK	VECT	State/Private	Yes	Government of Uttar Pradesh and AAI
Ghaziabad	Hindon Airport	HDO	VIDX	Domestic (CE)	Yes	MoD and AAI
Ghazipur	Andhau Airstrip			State/Private	No	Government of Uttar Pradesh
Gorakhpur	Gorakhpur Airport	GOP	VEGK	Domestic (CE)	Yes	MoD and AAI
Kanpur	Kanpur Airport	KNU	VIKA	Domestic (CE)	Yes	MoD and AAI
Kushinagar	Kushinagar International Airport	KBK	VEKI	International	Yes	AAI
Lalitpur	Lalitpur Airport			Domestic	No	AAI
Lucknow	Chaudhary Charan Singh International Airport	LKO	VILK	International	Yes	Adani Group
Meerut	Dr. Bhimrao Ambedkar Airstrip		VI2B	Domestic	No	AAI
Moradabad	Moradabad Airport	MZS	VIMB	Domestic	Yes	AAI
Noida	Noida International Airport	DXN	VIND	International	Yes	YIAPL
Prayagraj	Prayagraj Airport	IXD	VEAB	Domestic (CE)	Yes	MoD and AAI
Renukoot	Muirpur Airport		VI1D	State/Private	No	Government of Uttar Pradesh and AAI
Shravasti	Shravasti Airport	VSV	VISV	State/Private	Yes	Government of Uttar Pradesh and AAI
Varanasi	Lal Bahadur Shastri Airport	VNS	VEBN	International	Yes	AAI

=== Uttarakhand ===
Area served	Airport name	IATA	ICAO	Airport type	Operational	Owned/operated by
Dehradun	Jolly Grant Airport	DED	VIDN	Domestic	Yes	AAI
Pantnagar	Pantnagar Airport	PGH	VIPT	Domestic	Yes	AAI
Pithoragarh	Naini-Saini Airport	NNS	VIPG	State/Private	Yes	Government of Uttarakhand

=== West Bengal ===
Area served	Airport name	IATA	ICAO	Airport type	Operational	Owned/operated by
Asansol	Burnpur Airport		VEBB	State/Private	No	Steel Authority of India
Balurghat	Balurghat Airport	RGH	VEBG	Domestic	No	AAI
Cooch Behar	Cooch Behar Airport	COH	VECO	Domestic	Yes	AAI
Durgapur	Kazi Nazrul Islam Airport	RDP	VEDG	State/Private	Yes	BAPL
Kolkata	Behala Airport		VEBA	Domestic	No	AAI
Kolkata	Netaji Subhas Chandra Bose International Airport	CCU	VECC	International	Yes	AAI
Malda	Malda Airport	LDA	VEMH	Domestic	No	AAI
Siliguri	Bagdogra International Airport	IXB	VEBD	Customs	Yes	MoD and AAI

== List by union territory ==
=== Andaman and Nicobar Islands ===
Area served	Airport name	IATA	ICAO	Airport type	Operational	Owned/operated by
Port Blair	Veer Savarkar International Airport	IXZ	VOPB	International (CE)	Yes	MoD and AAI

=== Chandigarh ===
Area served	Airport name	IATA	ICAO	Airport type	Operational	Owned/operated by
Chandigarh	Shaheed Bhagat Singh International Airport	IXC	VICG	Customs	Yes	CHIAL

=== Dadra and Nagar Haveli & Daman and Diu ===
Area served	Airport name	IATA	ICAO	Airport type	Operational	Owned/operated by
Diu	Diu Airport	DIU	VADU	Domestic	Yes	AAI
Daman	Daman Airport	NMB	VADN	Domestic (CE)	Yes	MoD and AAI

=== Delhi ===
Area served	Airport name	IATA	ICAO	Airport type	Operational	Owned/operated by
Delhi NCR	Indira Gandhi International Airport	DEL	VIDP	International	Yes	DIAL
Delhi NCR	Safdarjung Airport		VIDD	Domestic	Yes	AAI

=== Jammu and Kashmir ===
Area served	Airport name	IATA	ICAO	Airport type	Operational	Owned/operated by
Jammu	Jammu Airport	IXJ	VIJU	Domestic (CE)	Yes	MoD and AAI
Srinagar	Srinagar International Airport	SXR	VISR	International	Yes	MoD and AAI

=== Ladakh ===
Area served	Airport name	IATA	ICAO	Airport type	Operational	Owned/operated by
Leh	Kushok Bakula Rimpochee Airport	IXL	VILH	Domestic (CE)	Yes	MoD and AAI

=== Lakshadweep ===
Area served	Airport name	IATA	ICAO	Airport type	Operational	Owned/operated by
Agatti Island	Agatti Airport	AGX	VOAT	Domestic	Yes	AAI

=== Puducherry ===
Area served	Airport name	IATA	ICAO	Airport type	Operational	Owned/operated by
Puducherry	Puducherry Airport	PNY	VOPC	Domestic	Yes	AAI

== See also ==
- List of the busiest airports in India
- Airports Authority of India
- List of pilot training institutes in India
