= Sonari Airport =

Airport in Jamshedpur, Jharkhand

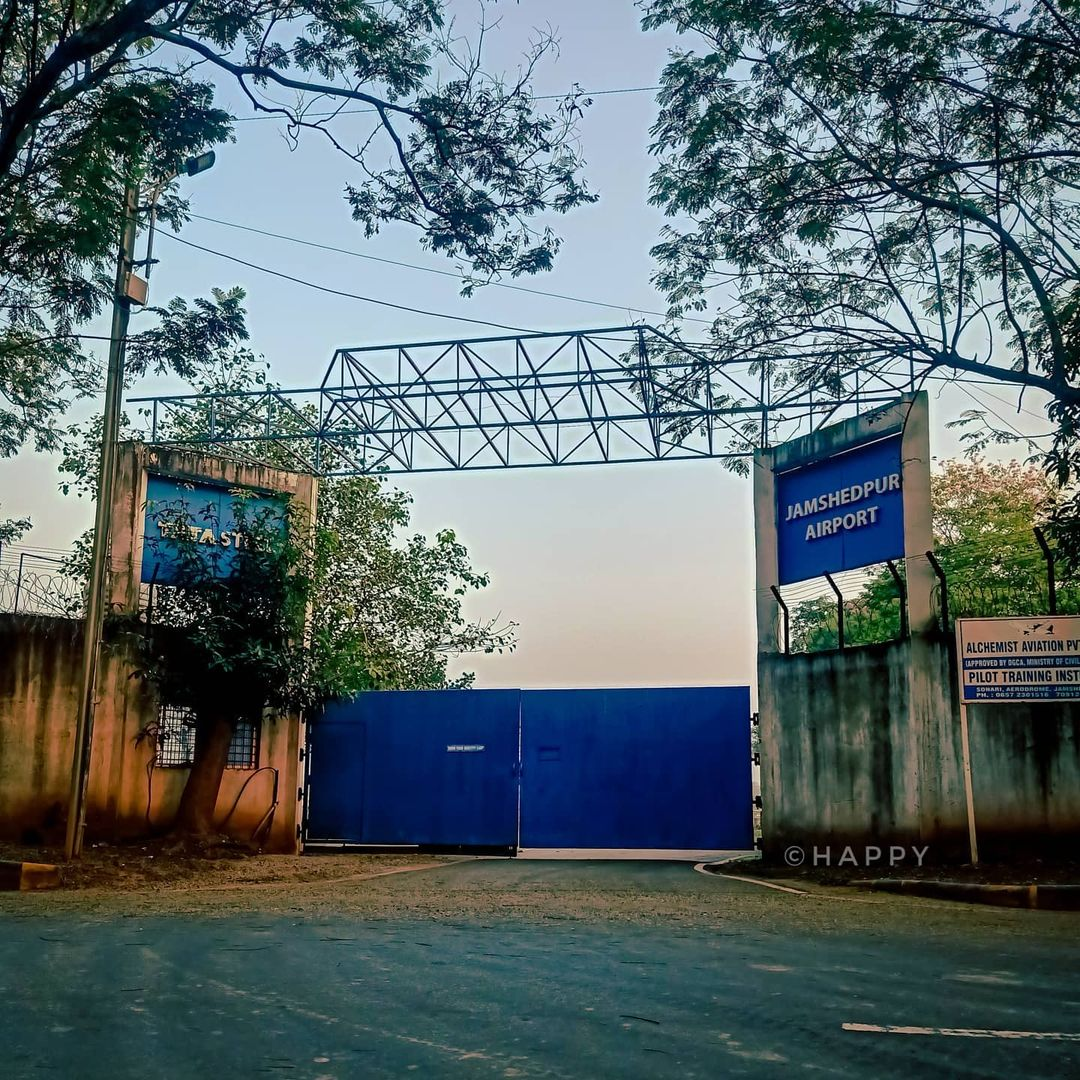
- IATA: IXW; ICAO: VEJS

Summary
- Airport type: Public
- Owner: Tata Steel
- Operator: Airports Authority of India
- Serves: Jamshedpur
- Location: Sonari, Jamshedpur, Jharkhand, India
- Opened: 1940; 86 years ago
- Elevation AMSL: 146 m (479 ft)
- Coordinates: 22°48′49″N 086°10′5″E
- Website: Sonari Airport

Map
- Location of the airport in Jharkhand IXW (India)

Runways
Direction	Length		Surface
Direction	m	ft	Surface
08/26	1,030	3,380	Asphalt

Statistics (April 2025 – March 2026)
- Passengers: 7,172 (▼ -24.9%)
- Aircraft movements: 1,290 (▼ -26.7%)
- Cargo tonnage: —
- Source: AAI

Sonari Airport (IATA: IXW, ICAO: VEJS), also known as Jamshedpur Airport, is a domestic airport in Jamshedpur, Jharkhand, India, owned by Tata Steel. It is located approximately 4.4 km (2.7 mi) from the city centre. It is the main airport serving the city of Jamshedpur and adjoining regions. The airport was in commercial operations until 2016, when the operations from the airport was ceased. After efforts taken by the Ministry of Civil Aviation, Government of Jharkhand and Tata Steel, The Directorate General of Civil Aviation (DGCA) granted licence to the airport for public use on 25 January 2023. It reopened for commercial operations between Kolkata and Bhubaneswar from 31 January 2023.

== History ==
The airport was opened in 1940 by the Tata Group and gave the ownership to its subsidiary, Tata Steel. In past years, the airport was served by airlines like Kingfisher Airlines and MDLR Airlines, which discontinued services due to various reasons despite recording good traffic. While MDLR ceased operations due to internal issues, Kingfisher had to discontinue services in November 2009 after load restrictions were imposed due to the short length of the runway. Since Kingfisher operated larger ATR-42 and ATR-72 aircraft respectively, operations became unviable. Scheduled flights were supposed to begin in 2018 under the government's UDAN Scheme, however, this did not take place. After efforts from the Ministry of Civil Aviation, Government of Jharkhand and Tata Steel, the airport has been reopened on 31 January 2023, with flight services provided by the new low-cost regional airline, IndiaOne Air, to Kolkata and Bhubaneswar.

== Future ==
As the airport is too small to handle regular commercial operations and also because of no space for expansion due to its location within the city, the airport will be replaced with a new airport at Dhalbhumgarh, which will be built at an initial investment ₹100 crores. The entire cost for construction of airport will be ₹300 crores which will be completed in two phases. It will be built on a former World War II era airfield. The construction of airport is expected to start once it receives necessary forest clearance from the Ministry of Environment, Forest and Climate Change, Govt of India, which is still under progress.

== Airlines and destinations ==
Airlines	Destinations
IndiaOne Air	Bhubaneswar, Kolkata

== See also ==
- Birsa Munda Airport
- Deoghar Airport
- Bokaro Airport
- Dhalbhumgarh Airport
- Chakulia Airport
- List of airports in India
- List of airports in Jharkhand
