= List of airports in Jharkhand =

This is a list of airports in Jharkhand, a state in eastern India. The list includes domestic, and international airports.

== Contents ==
This list contains the following information:

- **City served** - The city generally associated with the airport. This is not always the actual location since some airports are located in smaller towns outside the city they serve.
- **ICAO** - The location indicator assigned by the International Civil Aviation Organization (ICAO)
- **IATA** - The airport code assigned by the International Air Transport Association (IATA)
- **Airport name** - The official airport name. Those shown in bold indicate the airport has scheduled service on commercial airlines.
- Note - Specific information related to the airport

Role of airport
| Role | Description |
|---|---|
| International | Handles international flights |
| Customs | Airports with customs checking and clearance facilities handling international flights but not elevated to international airport status. |
| Domestic | Handles domestic flights |
| Civil enclave | Civil enclave at a military airfield |
| General aviation | No scheduled commercial flights |
| Military | Defence purposes |
| Flying school | Training purposes |
| Private | Privately owned |
| Future | Project proposed or under construction |
| Closed | No longer in operation |

| Commercial service | Airport has commercial service |
| Commercial service | Airport has no commercial service |

== List ==
| City served | Airport name | ICAO | IATA | Category | Status | Image |
|---|---|---|---|---|---|---|
| Bokaro | Bokaro Airport | VEBK | — | Domestic | Future | |
| Chaibasa | Chaibasa Airport | — | — | Domestic | Closed | |
| Chakulia | Chakulia Airport | VECK | — | Domestic | Non-operational | |
| Daltonganj | Chianki Airport | — | — | Domestic | Closed | |
| Deoghar | Deoghar Airport | VEDO | DGH | Domestic | Operational | |
| Dhanbad | Dhanbad Airport | VEDB | DBD | Domestic | Closed | |
| Dumka | Dumka Airport | IN-0100 | — | Domestic | Future | |
| Giridih | Giridih Airport | IN-0397 | — | Domestic | Closed | |
| Jamshedpur | Sonari Airport | VEJS | IXW | Domestic | Operational | |
| Jamshedpur | Dhalbhumgarh Airport | — | — | Domestic | Future | |
| Ranchi | Birsa Munda Airport | VERC | IXR | Domestic | Operational | |
