= Deoghar Airport =

Airport in Jharkhand, India

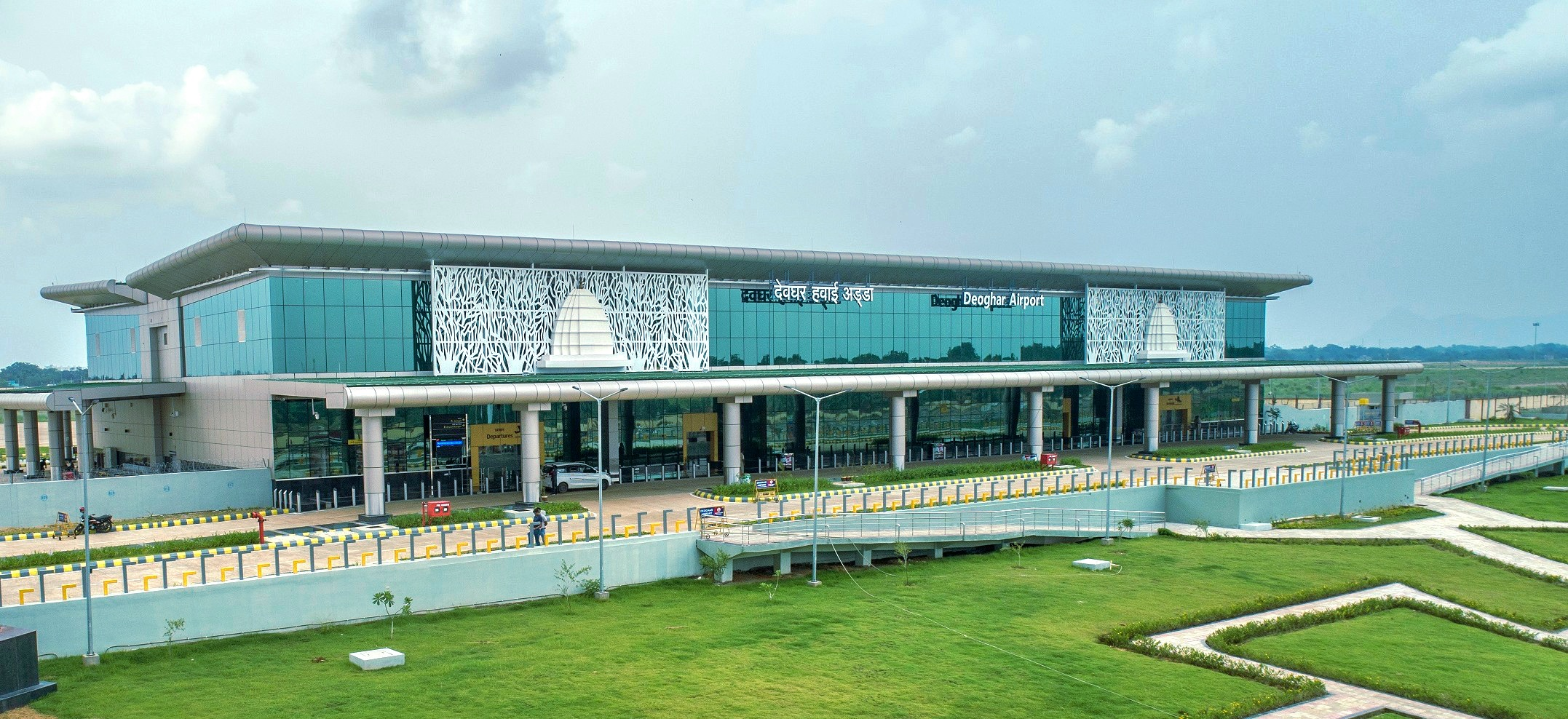
- IATA: DGH; ICAO: VEDO

Summary
- Airport type: Public
- Owner: Deoghar Airport Limited: Airports Authority of India (51%); Government of Jharkhand (49%)
- Operator: Airports Authority of India
- Serves: Deoghar
- Location: Deoghar, Jharkhand, India
- Opened: 12 July 2022; 4 years ago
- Elevation AMSL: 242 m (794 ft)
- Coordinates: 24°26′41″N 086°42′09″E
- Website: Deoghar Airport

Maps
- Location of airport in Jharkhand DGH (India)
- Interactive map of Deoghar Airport

Runways
Direction	Length		Surface
Direction	m	ft	Surface
09/27	2,500	8,202	Concrete

Statistics (April 2025 - March 2026)
- Passengers: 384,701 (▲36.7%)
- Aircraft movements: 2,964 (▼ -1.2%)
- Cargo tonnage: —
- Source: AAI

Deoghar Airport (IATA: DGH, ICAO: VEDO) is a domestic airport serving Deoghar in the state of Jharkhand, India. It is situated approximately 12 kilometres (7.4 mi) from the city centre. The airport has been primarily developed to serve the region of North-Eastern part of Jharkhand and some districts of West Bengal and Bihar. It also caters millions of pilgrims of Baidyanath Temple across the country and Sammed Shikarji for Jains. It is spread over 654 acres (265 ha). The airport has a 2,500 meter long runway, capable of handling Airbus A320, A321 and Boeing 737 type of aircraft. Prime Minister Narendra Modi laid the foundation stone of the airport on 25 May 2018, and it was opened on 12 July 2022.

== History ==
The Government of Jharkhand had signed a Memorandum of Understanding (MOU) with the Airports Authority of India (AAI) in 2013, to construct the airport, to promote religious tourism in the state.

The Government later signed a tripartite MOU with the AAI and Defence Research and Development Organisation (DRDO) in March 2017, to develop the airport for non-military use and for the operations of Airbus A320 and C-130 category aircraft. The construction of the Airport was completed on 2022. The airport received its aerodrome license from Directorate General of Civil Aviation, India (DGCA) in April 2022, for regular use of the airport for flight operations, under public use category later on on 28 June 2022, the DGCA upgraded its aerodrome licence from 3C to 4C allowing commercial aircraft operations up to Airbus 321 and Boeing 737. The first trial flight was done in June 2022, on Deoghar Airport by IndiGo from Kolkata before its commercial operations.

On 12 July 2022, The Airport was inaugurated by Prime Minister Narendra Modi. Scheduled commercial operations commenced on 12 June 2022 by IndiGo on the Deoghar-Kolkata route under RCS Udan Scheme. Flights for other destinations started later on.

On 16 April 2025, The Airport commenced its first night-time commercial flight operations with a scheduled service to New Delhi operated by IndiGo. This development marked the beginning of night-time operations at the airport and introduced a second daily flight on the Deoghar-Delhi route.

== Infrastructure ==
AAI built the airport at a cost of ₹ 400 crore. The airport has a 2,500 m (8,200 ft) long and 45 m (148 ft) wide runway, a 4,000-square-metre (43,000 sq ft) terminal building that can handle 200 passengers per hour, an Air Traffic Control (ATC) tower, an apron for two Airbus A320s/B737, taxiways and an isolation bay.

The terminal building has six check-in counters and two arrival belts with a peak hour handling capacity of 200 passengers. The design of the terminal building is inspired by the Baidyanath Temple's structure, and there are murals and paintings of Adivasi art, handicrafts and local tourist sites inside the airport. The airport is also equipped with an Instrument Landing System (ILS). The airport received DGCA approval for night landings in April 2024. Additionally, a DVOR navigational facility, completed in May 2022, is also fully operational.

Commercial night operations at the airport officially began on 16 April 2025 with IndiGo's evening flight to New Delhi, marking a significant milestone in the airport's operational expansion. On the same day, the Airport Authority of India (AAI) approved the upgrade of existing (CAT-I) Instrument Landing System (ILS) to a more advanced (CAT-II) landing system. This decision followed after Ranchi Airport’s inability to implement the CAT-II system due to land related constraints. Once completed, the upgrade will enable the airport to support enhanced night operations and aircraft landings in low-visibility conditions, with a runway visual range (RVR) as low as 350 meters.

Additionally, a Detailed Project Report (DPR) worth ₹450 crore has been finalized for the construction of a new terminal building. The proposed terminal will include four aerobridges to accommodate increased passenger traffic and ensure smoother flight operations. Construction is expected to commence in late 2025.

== UDAN Scheme ==
In April 2021, IndiGo was selected to operate flights from Deoghar to Ranchi, Kolkata, and Patna, under the Government's Regional Connectivity Scheme called UDAN. Flights to Delhi started on 30 July 2022 and other destinations like Ranchi, Patna and Kolkata started later.

== Airlines and destinations ==
Airlines	Destinations
IndiGo	Bengaluru, Delhi, Guwahati, Kolkata, Mumbai, Patna,

== See also ==
- Birsa Munda Airport
- Bokaro Airport
- Dumka Airport
- Dalbhumgarh Airport
- List of Airports in India
- List of Airports in Jharkhand
