= Mahmoodpur Mazara =

Village in Uttar Pradesh, India

Coordinates: 29.501°N 77.871°E

Mahmoodpur Mazara is a small village located in Morna block of Muzaffarnagar district, Uttar Pradesh. The main occupation of the people is farming. Mahmoodpur Mazara uses the national currency which is the Indian rupee and follows Indian Standard Time (IST). Mahmoodpur Mazara is also famous for Colocasia (arvi). There is a van vibhag plant nursery in the village. The main sports in the village are cricket, kabaddi and volleyball. The area of the village is 0.138 km^{2} (0.053 sq mi) and Perimeter is 1.758 km^{2} (0.679 sq mi).

== Demographics ==
As of the 2011 census there are a total of 167 families residing in the village, with a total population of 927 of which 491 are males and 436 are females. 100 residents are children aged 0–6 which makes up 10.79% of the total population. The number of females per 1000 males is 888 in the village. The main Religion in the village is Hindu and about 60% of the population are Jats. The main gotra in the village is Tomar, Nirwal, Duhan, Saini and Harijan.

== Education ==
The literacy rate in Mahmoodpur Mazara was 76.18% in 2011, with 86.27% of male residents and 64.87% of female residents being literate. The native language of Mahmoodpur Mazara is Hindi. There is a prathmik vidyalaya government school in the village and nearest schools are Janta inter college and Indraprasth public school.

== Connectivity ==
The surrounding nearby villages and its distance from Mahmoodpur Mazara are Dhiraheri 1.5 km, Nirgajni 2.9 km, Rahmatpur 4.3 km, Bhopa 2.5 km The nearest post office is Bhopa (pin-code 251308) and the nearest railway station is Muzaffarnagar railway station which is located around 20.1 kilometers away. The surrounding state capital is Delhi 120.4 km (74.8 mi) and nearest airport is Meerut Airport 69.1 km (42.9 mi) away.
