= Bokaro Airport =

Airport in Bokaro, Jharkhand, India

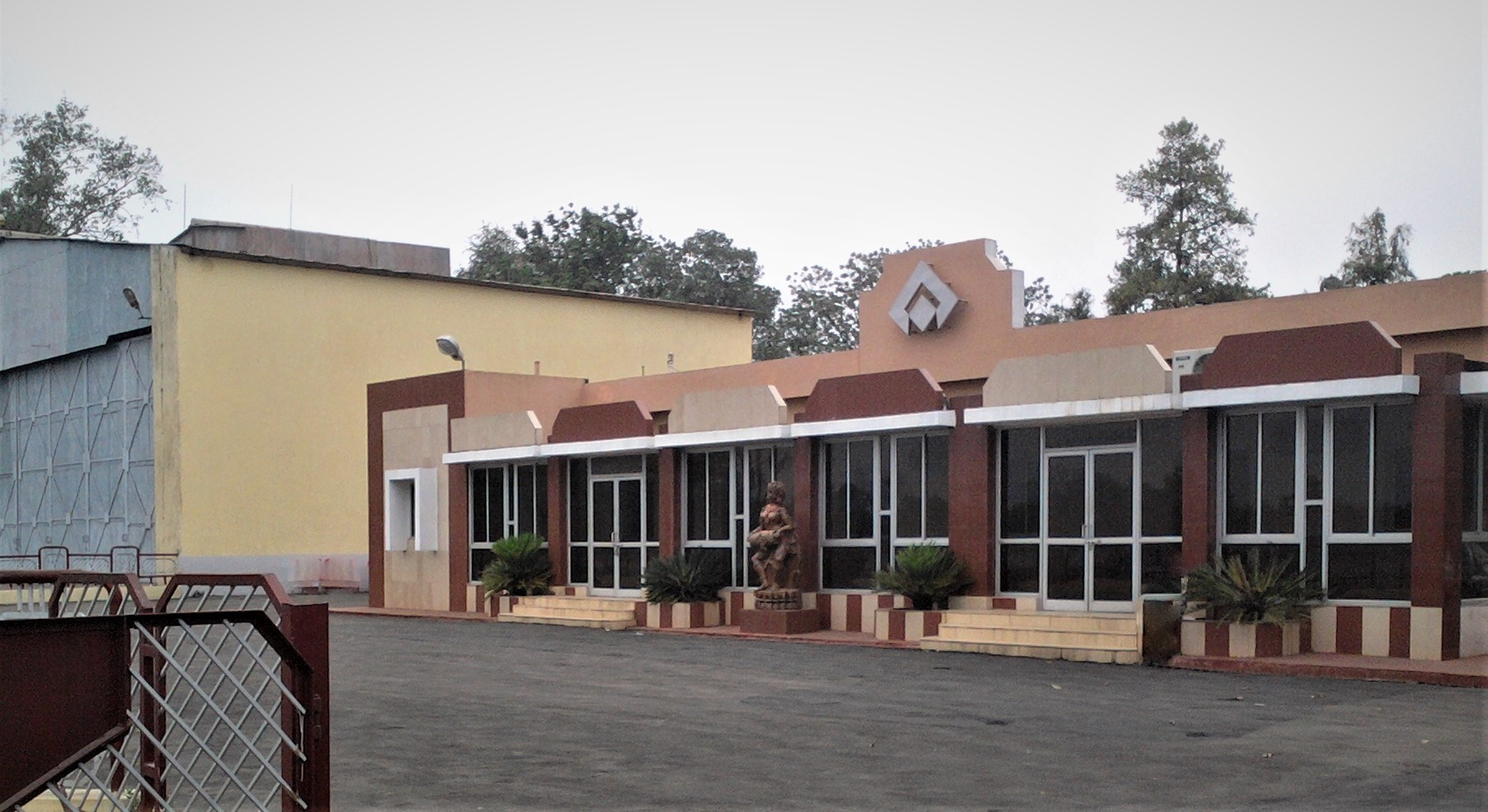
- Terminal Building of Bokaro Airport
- IATA: none; ICAO: VEBK

Summary
- Airport type: Public
- Owner: Steel Authority of India Limited
- Operator: Airports Authority of India
- Serves: Bokaro
- Location: Bokaro, Jharkhand, India
- Elevation AMSL: 715 ft / 218 m
- Coordinates: 23°38′36″N 86°08′56″E

Map
- Location of the airport in Jharkhand VEBK (India)

Runways
Direction	Length		Surface
Direction	ft	m	Surface
13/31	5,413	1,650	Asphalt

Bokaro Airport (IATA: none, ICAO: VEBK) is a domestic airport owned by the Steel Authority of India Limited (SAIL) and operated by the Airports Authority of India (AAI). It is located approximately 4.1 km (2.5 mi) from the city centre. The airport has been primarily developed to serve the region of Eastern part of Jharkhand and some districts of West Bengal. It is spread over an area of 200 acres (81 ha) while the runway is 1,650 meters long, capable of handling ATR 72 type of aircraft. Former Chief Minister Raghubar Das and former Minister of State for Civil Aviation Jayant Sinha laid the foundation stone of development for the airport on 25 August 2018, and is set to be inaugurated on 28 February 2024.

== History ==
The airport was built in the late 1960s to handle private flights for operations of the Steel Authority of India Limited. It began operating as a private airport until 2010. In the mid-2010s, the former Chief Minister Raghubar Das drafted a plan to develop this airport to handle scheduled commercial flights.

The steel company had signed a Memorandum of Understanding (MoU) with the Airports Authority of India (AAI) in 2018, to construct the airport, to promote tourism in the state. The development work included resurfacing and strengthening of the existing runway, apron, taxiways, including grading of the operational area, along with the provision of expendable low-cost terminal building, installation of Air Traffic Control (ATC) tower, ESS building, watch tower, PAPI, night landing facilities on the runway and other ancillary works which are now almost completed.

== Infrastructure ==
The airport includes a boundary wall and perimeter road, terminal building, and passenger waiting areas. At least 6000 trees were cut down, while over 1000 trees were transplanted for the expansion of the airport. With an investment of ₹ 8 crore, the Air Traffic Control tower was built by Airports Authority of India. The tower is mobile and can be moved around the airport as needed.

== UDAN ==
In June 2023, Alliance Air and FlyBig was selected to operate flights from Bokaro to Kolkata and Patna, under the Government's Regional Connectivity Scheme called UDAN.

== See also ==
- Birsa Munda Airport
- Dumka Airport
- Dhalbhumgarh Airport
- List of airports in India
- List of airports in Jharkhand
