= Royal Air Force in World War II =

British Royal Air Force during the Second World War

Royal Air Force
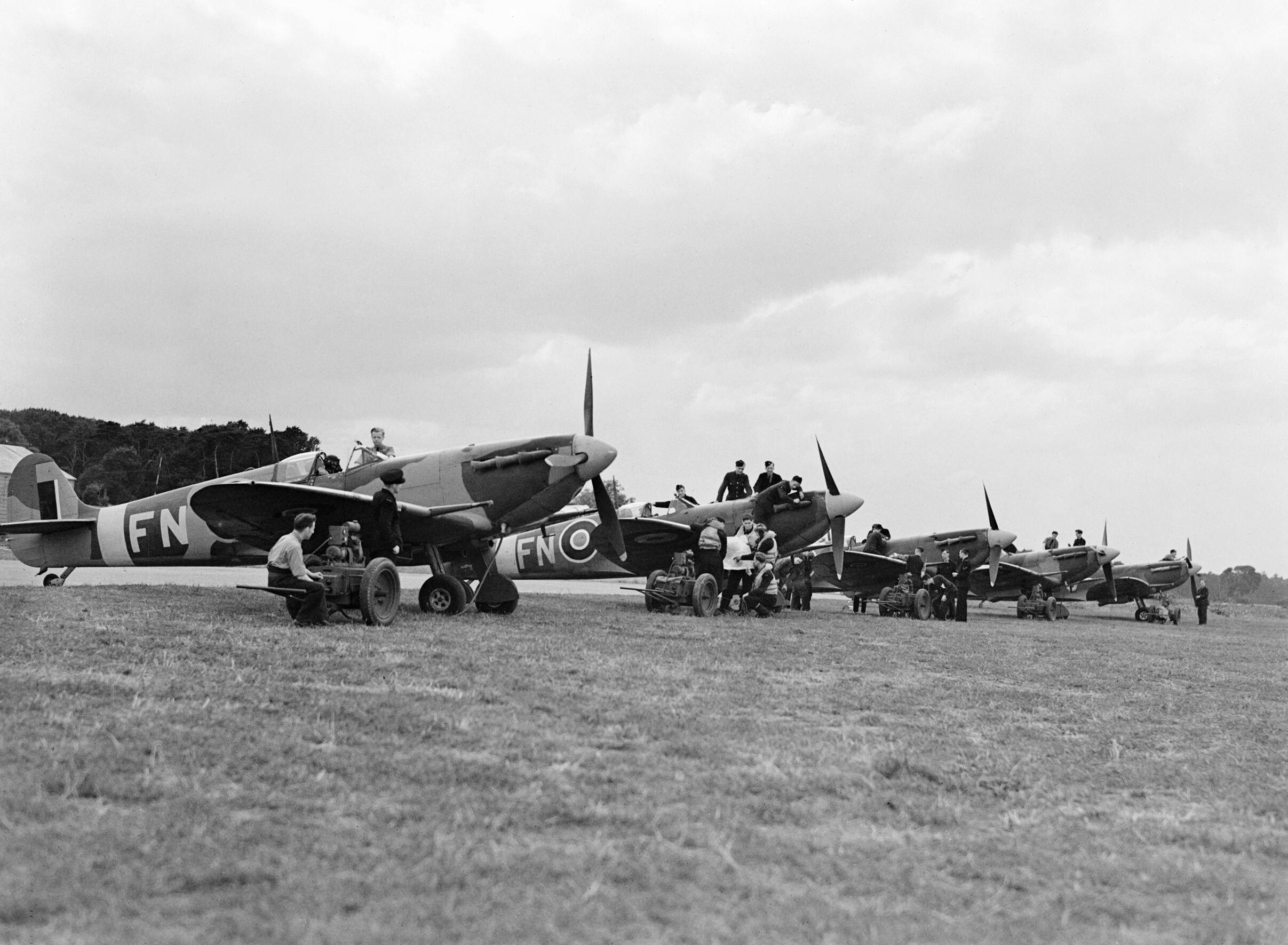
- Spitfire VBs of No. 453 Squadron at Drem in Scotland
- Motto: "Per Ardua ad Astra" (Latin) (Through Adversity to the Stars)
- Founded: 1 April 1918; 108 years ago
- Headquarters: Adastral House, London

Leadership
- King George VI: Head of the Armed Forces
- Prime Minister: Winston Churchill
- Secretary of State for Air: Archibald Sinclair
- Chief of the Air Staff: Air Chief Marshal Sir Charles Portal

The Royal Air Force (RAF) played a central role in the defence of Britain and in the fight against the Axis powers during the Second World War. The RAF was divided into three main commands: Fighter Command, Bomber Command and Coastal Command, each of which had specific tasks and areas of responsibility. Fighter Command was responsible for the defence of British airspace and played a key role in countering the German Luftwaffe during the Battle of Britain. Bomber Command was responsible for strategic bombing raids on enemy infrastructure, industrial plants and cities, while Coastal Command was responsible for securing the sea lanes and fighting German submarines and ships. In addition to the operational units, the RAF relied on a complex network of support and training facilities. Flying schools, technical depots and logistics units ensured that the force was always combat-ready.

== Command, control and organization ==
At the beginning of the war, supreme command of all three branches of the armed forces - army, navy and air force - lay with the War Cabinet. When Winston Churchill was elected Prime Minister in May 1940, he formed an additional Inner War Cabinet in which he could act directly with the military commanders, who together formed the Chief of Staffs Committee. The Air Council had supreme command of the Royal Air Force. It consisted of the following members.

- Secretary of State for Air
- Parliamentary Under-Secretary of State for Air
- Chief of the Air Staff
- Air Member for Personnel
- Air Member for Development & Organization
- Deputy Chief of the Air Staff
- Permanent Under-Secretary of State for Air

Each Air Member was responsible for a specific department of the Air Ministry. These departments were in turn subdivided into various specific directorates corresponding to his appointment title. The rest of the Air Ministry was divided into directorates, departments and committees of civil service members.

=== Command ===
At the outbreak of the war, there were 7 air commands. Each of these commands was usually commanded by an air chief marshal. Bomber Command, formed in 1936, consisted of all bomber squadrons except those of Coastal Command, United Kingdom. These squadrons were organized into a number of divisions and were charged with carrying out the offensive bombing directives laid down by the Chief of the Air Staff. Fighter Command, established in 1936, was responsible for the air defence of the United Kingdom. It consisted of a staff at Bentley Priory and fighter groups, and also took operational control of Anti-Aircraft Command, which in turn ran the aircraft warning system and the searchlight and sound detection units. The fighter groups were distributed throughout the United Kingdom in the following four sectors:

- South East England
- North of England, Scotland
- West of England
- South West England

The Coastal Command, formed in 1936, was tasked with maritime reconnaissance using land-based aircraft. It also included land-based bombers, torpedo bombers and long-range fighters to counter attacks on shipping in the areas of focus. The sea area surrounding the United Kingdom was divided into three operational sectors: West and Northwest, North and East, and South and Southeast. Orders regarding the tasks and operational division of troops and plans were issued only by the Admiralty, personnel were provided by the RAF and equipment was supplied by the Ministry of Aircraft Production. Training Command, formed in 1936, was tasked with the flight training of pilots. Operational training was carried out in the Bomber, Fighter and Coastal Commands, with each command having the necessary operational training units. The Maintenance Command, formed in 1938, was responsible to all units for supplying and equipping them with aircraft (through the Ministry of Aircraft Production) and with ammunition, gasoline, oil, etc. It was also responsible for repair and maintenance. It was also responsible for the repair and recovery of equipment, the storage, packing and shipment of aircraft, engines, etc. used by the operational units, and the transfer of aircraft. Founded in 1938, Balloon Command was tasked with the organization, administration, training and supply of the UK's balloon defence system. Operational control lay with the commander-in-chief of the UK's air defence, the Air Officer Commanding-in-Chief.

Further commands were established during the course of the war. In 1940, the Army Co-operation Command, which was assigned to army units within the United Kingdom. Until its dissolution in 1943, it was responsible for the organization, testing and training in all forms of cooperation between air and land forces. Operational deployment was the responsibility of the commanders of the army units to which the wings of the command were assigned. Also in 1940, the Technical Training Command was established for the technical training of RAF personne.

=== Group, wing, squadron ===
A group consisted of several subordinate units and was organized in such a way that it had a certain autonomy in its area of operations. A group consisted of several squadrons. The number of squadrons varied depending on the type and mission of the group. Typically, a group consisted of about 2 wings and was commanded by either an air commodore or a vice air marshal.

A wing usually consisted of three squadrons but could vary from 2 to 5 squadrons. Wings were usually commanded by a Group Captain. Single-engine fighter squadrons were commanded by a squadron leader and usually consisted of three flights, designated A, B, and C, which were subordinate to a flight lieutenant. Twin-engine night fighter, bomber, interceptor and Coastal Command fighter squadrons were commanded by a Wing Commander and the individual flights by a Squadron Leader. During the war, the number of aircraft in a squadron varied according to size. In 1939, a fighter squadron consisted of 12 aircraft, but in some cases was increased to 16 or even 24. Bomber squadrons initially had 12 aircraft, which were increased up to 24.

The squadrons were based at specific Royal Air Force bases, which were equipped with all the necessary support facilities. At the beginning of the war, each squadron had its own ground crew, which was responsible for the maintenance of the unit's aircraft, major repairs and other tasks that went beyond the capabilities of the squadron's own resources. These tasks were usually carried out by base personnel or maintenance units (MUs). By the end of the war, however, many squadrons had lost their autonomy and their ground crews were officially transferred to Squadron Servicing Echelons, which were “attached” to the respective squadrons. These squadrons usually included the squadron number in their “legal” title.

Each RAF squadron received official numbers as part of their designation. Most of the squadrons numbered 1 to 274 had originally been taken over from the Royal Flying Corps or the Royal Navy Air Arm. During the Second World War, the RAF experienced a significant increase in personnel, which led to the creation of many new squadrons. In response, the RAF's administrative departments assigned specific numbering sequences to the various squadrons, identifying their roles, origins and other characteristics. This system also applied to the numerous Commonwealth and other non-British units that eventually operated under RAF command. Due to changing wartime and operational conditions, some squadrons were disbanded, renamed or withdrawn from the front. As a result, not all squadrons were active at the same time.

While each squadron was primarily identified by its official number, an additional system of code letters was used to identify individual units. These code letters were painted on the fuselage flanks of the aircraft. These codes were used to identify individual aircraft within a squadron or unit, with the name of the squadron or unit indicated by the first two letters of the code. However, on 4 September 1939, all such codes were completely changed in the interests of safety. As the war progressed, several variations and additions to the code letter system were introduced.

This system was soon adopted by virtually all flying units, both operational and non-operational. Such code letter combinations were used in certain squadrons in the United Kingdom and in some overseas war zones. In early 1941, Fighter Command introduced the position of Wing Leader, an operational role that oversaw the coordination of fighter units in combat. To facilitate identification, Wing Leaders were authorized to use the initials of their name as their individual identifier. Normally a squadron operated as a unit, although at certain stages of the war it was common for squadrons to work with other squadrons of the same wing. However, it became common practice for individual squadrons of a squadron to be detached from the squadron's base to operate separately at another airfield to fulfill specific operational requirements.

== Recruitment and training ==
=== Airmen ===
At the beginning of the war, all training activities, both in the air and on the ground, were under the control of Training Command, based at Shinfield Park. In May 1940, Training Command was disbanded and replaced by separate commands overseeing technical training and flying training. At this time, the latter controlled 80 training schools, 31 of which were dedicated to pilot training, and had a fleet of 3,189 aircraft of 56 different types. The Flying Training Command retained its base at Shinfield Park, while the Technical Training Command was based at nearby Wantage Hall.

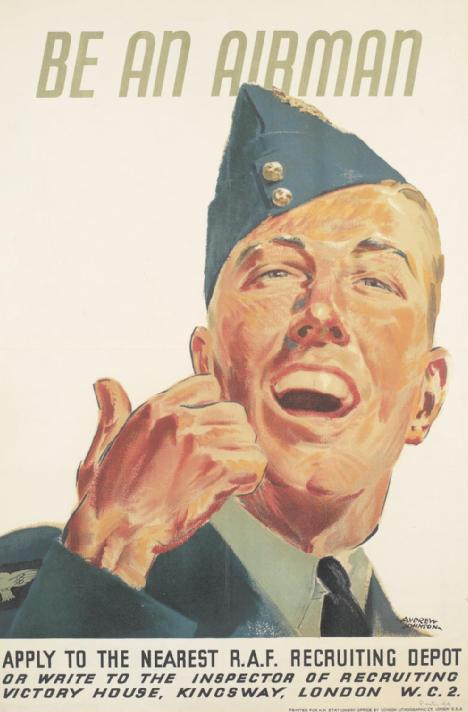
RAF recruiting poster

Most RAF and WAAF recruits, including officers and aircrew, came from the RAF Volunteer Reserve (RAFVR). At the start of the war, all opportunities for entry into regular RAF service were temporarily closed, with the exception of the Aircraft Apprenticeship Scheme. These included the Boy Entrant Scheme and the Cadet Training Course at Cranwell College. To create a pool of future pilots, the Air Training Corps was established in 1941. The program offered boys between the ages of 16 and 18 one to two years of training to prepare them for entry into the RAF.

In peacetime, RAF pilots received around 150 hours of training and practice before being assigned to squadrons. There they underwent additional 'continuation' training until they were deemed fully competent to carry out their assigned flying duties in the squadron. However, once the squadrons were mobilized for their wartime duties, they had neither the facilities nor the personnel to complete pilot training. This final phase was therefore initially carried out by Group Pool or Reserve Squadrons, i.e. units assigned to training duties within the respective group. From 1941, these advanced training units were known as Operational Training Units (OTUs). The training initially comprised eight weeks of theory and basic instruction in an Initial Training Wing (ITW), followed by ten weeks of flight and theory instruction in an Elementary Flying Training School (EFTS). This was followed by up to 16 weeks of “advanced” flight training at a Service Flying Training School (SFTS). This was followed by another training session with an OTU for a period of four to six weeks, with the aim of familiarizing the pilots with the type of aircraft that would be used in their intended missions with the squadron.

Altogether, the pilots received around 200 flying hours before entering service. As the war progressed, the training program for bomber pilots was expanded to include additional training sections, e.g. Heavy Conversion Units (HCUs) and - for Avro Lancaster pilots - the Lancaster Finishing School (LFS). This increased the total number of flying hours to 350-360 hours before the squadron was deployed. Due to the significant influx of recruits in 1939 and 1940, training up to Operational Training Unit (OTU) level under the Empire Air Training Scheme (EATS) took place outside the UK - mainly in Canada, USA, Australia and New Zealand.

All OTUs were subordinate to the operational commands to which the trainees would later be assigned. A bomber pilot assigned to an OTU usually assembled his future crew of navigators, bombardiers, radio operators and gunners within the first 48 hours. The crews were - at least in theory - assigned to a squadron as a unit after joining. Usually, if circumstances permitted, the pilot first completed a few missions as co-pilot of an experienced pilot before the entire crew operated together. The duration of the entire training process could take up to two years, depending on the requirements. In return, numerous OTUs were used for actual missions.

=== Ground crew ===
Most members of the ground crew were not certified aircraft mechanics as defined by the recognized RAF definition, but merely those who had completed training in a metalworking trade. As the age limits for enlistment rose during 1941-45, many new recruits were already qualified tradesmen and could often be accepted into service with only minimal training. As the technical aspects of the RAF became increasingly complex, a total of more than 350 trades had to be covered by the end of the war. Apart from the usual 8-12 weeks of military training for all new recruits, the duration of vocational training varied from a few weeks for auxiliaries to 2 years for skilled workers. The influx of mechanics was mainly drawn from former non-commissioned officers or civilians with proven technical qualifications.

== Uniforms ==
The uniform for officers and warrant officers was a compromise between the traditions of the Royal Navy and the British Army. The 1919 uniform (No. 1 dress uniform) was strongly based on the uniform of cavalry officers, while the rank insignia were placed on the cuffs in the style of the Navy (the cavalry officers of the First World War also wore rank insignia on their cuffs). Officers had to buy their own uniform. It was made of blue-grey barathea fabric and was worn over a blue-grey shirt and a black tie, with black shoes. The tunic was belted with a brass buckle, single-breasted with four brass buttons and had two breast pockets and two side pockets, all fastened with a single brass button. The rank insignia on the cuffs were made of black lace with a light blue central stripe. The trousers had welt pockets and, as was customary at the time, a button fly.

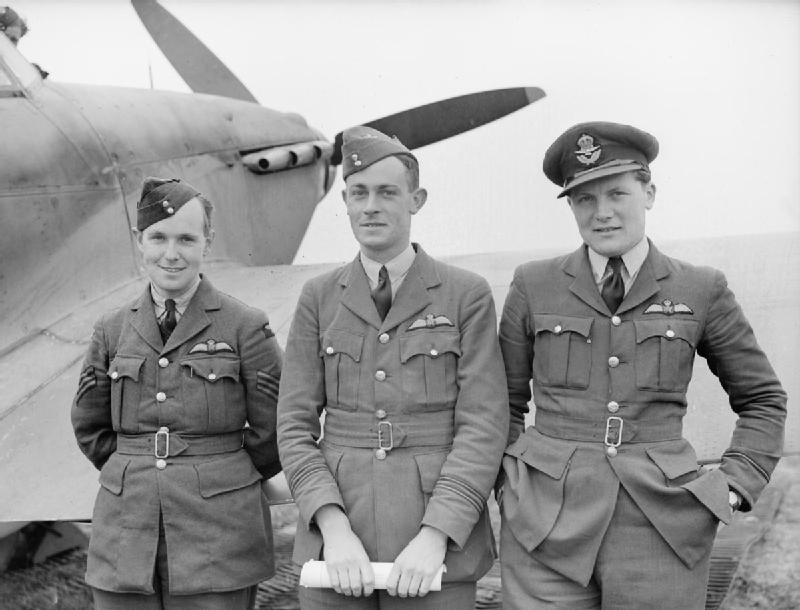
The pilots of No 73 Squadron, Sergeant Lionel Pilkington, Flight Lieutenant Reginald “Unlucky” Lovett and Flying Officer Newall “Fanny” Orton, in dress uniform in April 1940.

The uniform was worn with a peaked cap or side cap, also in blue-grey. The peaked cap had a black mohair band and cloth peak and a gold embroidered crown over a gilt eagle and gold laurel leaves for all officers up to and including the rank of Wing Commander. Insignia for Group Captains and above consisted of a gold embroidered wreath surrounding a gilded eagle surmounted by a crown and lion. The side cap was made of lined barathea with a brass crown and eagle and two brass buttons on the front. The pilot's version had light blue piped edges and a smaller version of the cap badge. All ranks wore their pilot's brevets above the medal ribbons, which were located above the left breast pocket. The tropical uniforms largely corresponded to those of the British Army: khaki shorts and shirts, with socks reaching just below the knee. Headgear remained the same as in temperate climates.

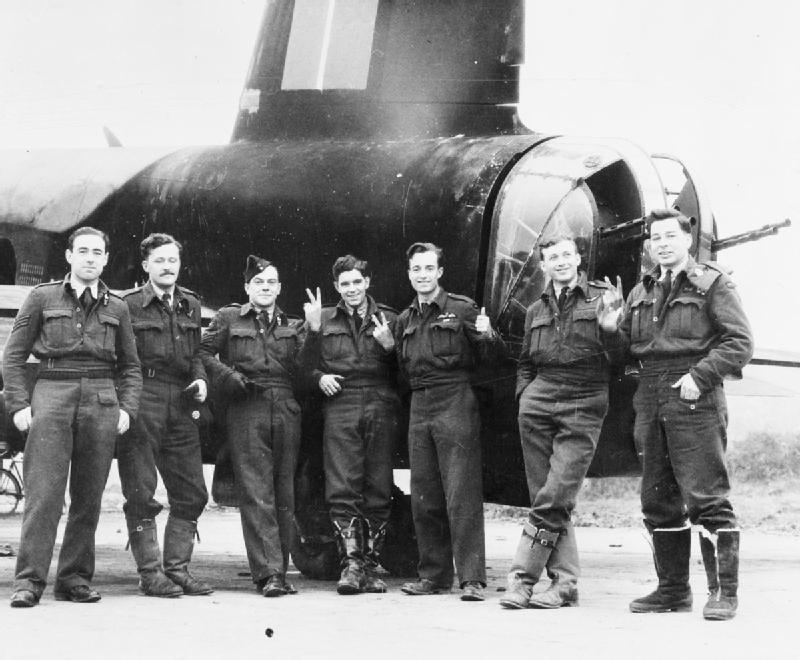
Bomber crew of Flight Sergeant A M Halkett in heavy duty dress

Although there were attempts at a battle dress in RAF gray-blue as early as 1939, it was not introduced until 1942. The RAF battle dress (“No. 2 Dress” or “Heavy Duty Dress”) had a characteristic pattern. It was worn by all ranks with an open stand-up collar that exposed the blue drill lining and facings: the pocket flaps on the blouse were taken from those of the previous tunic. All the buttons on the blouse were covered by a button placket. The pants had no normal trouser pockets, only a small pocket on the left thigh. There were buttons on the trousers at ankle height so that they could be fastened tightly to make it easier to slip into the flying boots. Rank insignia were worn on the sleeves by NCOs and in the form of cloth loops at the bottom of the epaulettes by officers. Long double-breasted coats could be worn over both types of uniform by all ranks. Coats for officers were made of fleece or melton and had a cloth belt with a gilded buckle.

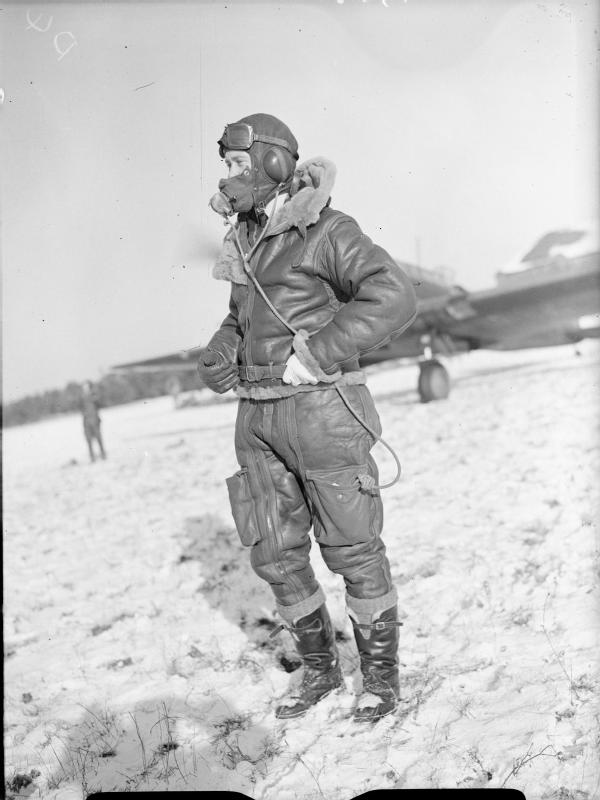
The pilot of a Fairey Battle, wearing a Type B helmet and Irvin flying suit on a snow-covered airfield in France.

There were five rows of buttons and epaulettes with rank insignia. Officers of the RAuxAF and the Volunteer Reserve wore brass buttons with A and VR respectively on each lapel. From 1936, the uniform for NCOs up to and including the rank of Flight Sergeant was a simplified unlined version of the uniform for officers in blue and gray serge. The general appearance corresponded to that of the officers' uniform, with the side pockets open. Before the war, a blue-grey cap with a shiny black peak and a simplified brass badge with the letters “RAF” surrounded by a laurel wreath and surmounted by a crown was worn. However, this was abolished in December 1939, so that the standard headgear was now a blue-grey serge shuttle, with the same brass buttons as the officer's version, but with the brass badge of the other ranks.

The NCOs' battle dress was also similar to that of the officers, but was unlined and the rank insignia was worn on the sleeves, as with the tunic. The long, double-breasted coat for NCOs was made of serge, was unbelted and had only four rows of buttons. Warrant officer and flight sergeant uniforms had sewn-on crowns on the underside of the sleeves or below the shoulder. All other ranks wore an eagle embroidered in light blue cotton on blue and black fabric at the top of the sleeve. As with the other uniforms, the tropical equipment was similar to that of the officers, with the exception that the rank insignia was also worn below the shoulder. Since the heating systems in the airplanes were relatively primitive, there were different types of flight clothing, adapted to the season and the type of flight. The most important item of flying clothing was the one-piece khaki or green waterproof Sidcot overall, which had its origins in the First World War. The overall was lined with linen and had a full-length zipper down the front, sleeves, legs, crotch and waist to allow the wearer to reach his uniform pockets.

== Ranks ==
Ranks and insignia
designation	Flag officer				Senior officer			Junior officer			
Shoulder mark											
Rank	Marshal of the RAF	Air Chief Marshal	Air Marshal	Air Vice Marshal	Air Commodore	Group Captain	Wing Commander	Squadron Leader	Flight Lieutenant	Flying Officer	Pilot Officer

Rank and insignia of NCO and rank and file
designation	Non commissioned officer					Enlisted rank
Shoulder mark						
Rank	Warrant Officer Class 1	Warrant Officer Class 2	Flight Sergeant	Sergeant	Corporal	Leading Aircraftman

== Accommodation ==
Both airmen and ground crew were housed in a variety of accommodation during the Second World War, which could vary greatly depending on the location, type of operation and rank of the soldiers. Accommodation was closely linked to the strategic use of each airbase, which were spread across the UK and in areas abroad used by the RAF.

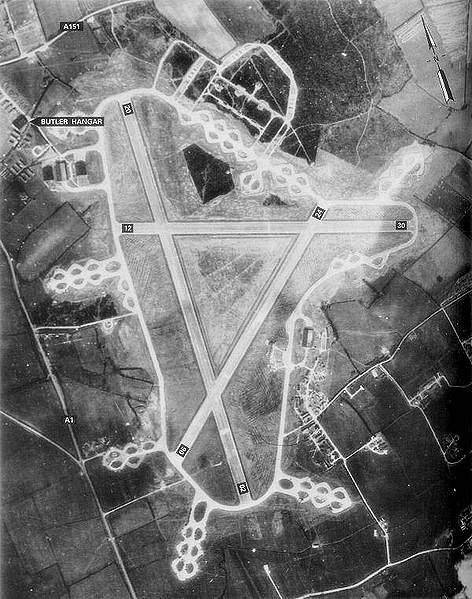
Aerial view of a typical airfield (North Witham Airfield)

The permanent airfields of the pre-war period consisted of well-built brick buildings for officers' messes and living quarters. The buildings were either centrally heated or had coal-fired boilers. The airfields usually consisted of three runways of different lengths (approx. 1,300 m, 1,400 m and 1,800 m), which intersected in the shape of a triangle. The ends of the runways were connected by a wide, well-built taxiway, along which there were ten to fifteen lay-bys where the aircraft were distributed and, in suitable weather, minor repairs that did not require a hangar could be carried out. Each hangar was centrally heated and had rest and training rooms as well as changing rooms for the crew. The medical facilities consisted of a one- or two-storey infirmary, which was also centrally heated. Recreational and sports accommodation was included in the planning and built as part of the airfield buildings. Pitches were laid out for rugby, soccer and tennis. Many air bases had sports halls, which further increased the range of sports on offer.

The shelters that were built during the war often consisted of simple, pragmatic buildings. Many RAF pilots and ground personnel lived in Nissen huts, semi-circular barracks made of corrugated iron, which could be erected quickly and cheaply. These huts provided space for several people and were often spartanly furnished, with simple camp beds, wooden tables and stoves for heating. Most of these huts had no running water, simple sanitary facilities and a poor power supply. In addition to the Nissen huts, there were also larger communal accommodations, such as dormitories, which were intended for ground personnel. The infrastructure on the bases was designed for efficiency. In addition to sleeping facilities, there were canteens, officers' messes, classrooms, infirmaries and recreational facilities. Officers were accommodated in separate quarters, which were often better equipped, for example in permanent buildings or officers' barracks. On some bases, higher-ranking officers were billeted in nearby country houses or manor houses that had been requisitioned by the RAF.

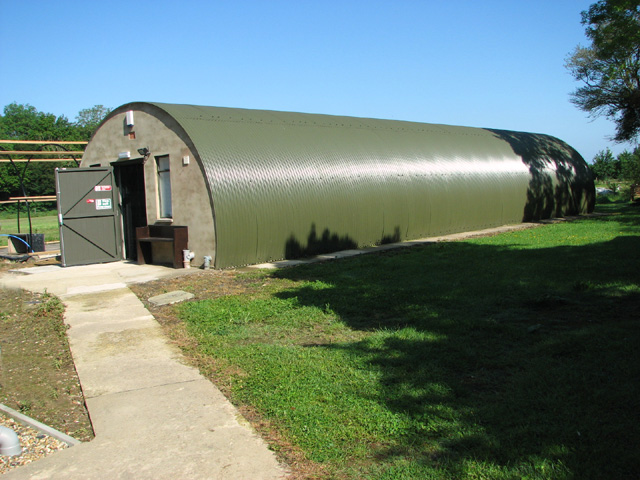
Reconstructed Nissen hut on the former Hethel military airfield

In the operational theaters of war, where units had to be constantly mobilized, accommodation was provided in bivouacs or in any available permanent or temporary local structures. These shelters consisted mainly of Nissen and Lagos huts as well as huts made from local wood. These huts had to withstand the environmental conditions of the area in which they were built, such as heavy rain, sandstorms, tropical storms, etc. In tropical climates, they retained their warmth even if they were fitted with false ceilings. Some improvement was achieved by whitewashing the roofs, which lowered the internal temperature by 0.5 to 1 °C. However, as natural ventilation was not sufficient to cool the huts and was further restricted by the need for insect protection, the only really effective way to achieve a degree of comfort was to install electric ceiling fans.

In colder regions like Iceland, living conditions were harsh, characterized by the island's remote location, extreme weather and limited infrastructure. Icelandic weather was extremely unpredictable, with frequent storms, strong winds and heavy rain or snow, depending on the season. Winters were long and dark. The bitter cold and persistent wind made outdoor work very strenuous, especially for the ground crew who were responsible for maintaining the aircraft in these conditions. The aircraft hangars, where available, offered only limited protection, so much of the work had to be done outdoors. Ice and snow often covered the runways, so that the airfields had to be constantly maintained in order to remain operational. All drinking and washing water had to be brought in; there were only poor washing facilities, and the emergency toilet had to be used in outhouses. The huts were poorly heated and the damp environment contributed to discomfort and health problems such as colds and respiratory illnesses. The remoteness of the airfields, which were often located in remote areas far from Icelandic cities, contributed to a feeling of loneliness and monotony among the airmen.

== Pay ==
Flag Officer
Rank	annual pay
Marshal of the RAF	2311 £
Air Marshal	1983 £
Air Vice Marshal	1651 £
Air Commodore	1064 £

Senior Officer
Rank	annual pay
Group Captain	958 £
Wing Commander	660 £
Squadron Leader	562 £

Junior Officer
Rank	annual pay
Flight Lieutenant	428 £
Flying Officer	331 £
Pilot Officer	264 £
Acting Pilot Officer	215 £

The daily rates of basic pay for all ranks below Officer varied at each grade level depending on which trade group the individual was enlisted in; for example, a Corporal in Group I had a daily basic pay rate of 7/6d, while a Corporal in Trade Group V received a daily basic pay rate of 4/6d. The following table shows the minimum and maximum daily basic pay rates, from Aircraftman to Warrant Officer, by trade group:

Ground crew
trade group	minimum rate	maximum rate
group I	3 s 9 d	16 s 6 d
group II	3 s 6 d	15 s
group III	3 s	13 s 6 d
group IV	3 s 3 d	14 s
group V	2 s	13 s 6 d
group M	2 s	13 s 6 d

== Departments ==
=== Royal Air Force Regiment ===
To protect RAF airfields and installations, the Royal Air Force Regiment, a special corps responsible for ground defence and force protection, was formed on February 1, 1942. At the beginning of the war, the army was responsible for defending airfields, but did not have the specialist training and understanding of air operations required for this task. The RAF Regiment was tasked with filling this gap, ensuring that airfields remained operational during attacks and providing the RAF with a self-contained force to protect its vital infrastructure.As the war progressed, the Regiment's remit expanded to include securing forward airfields in active combat zones such as North Africa, Europe and the Far East. The RAF regiment was initially organized into squadrons and field squadrons: The regiment was commanded by a staff attached to the Air Ministry, and its personnel comprised both volunteers and conscripts from the RAF.

=== Women's Auxiliary Air Force ===
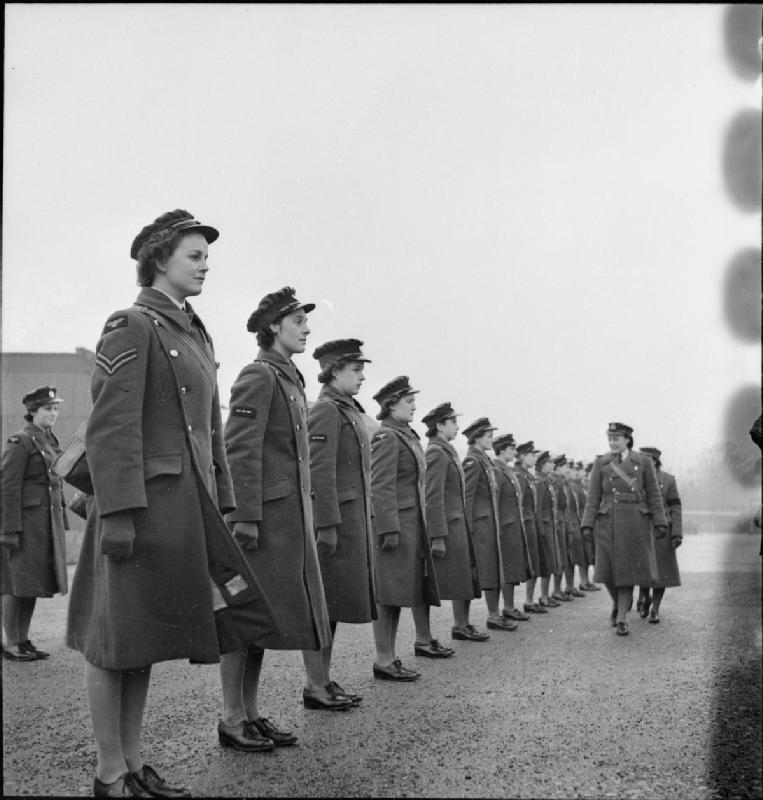
A group of WAAFs is inspected at Bridgnorth airfield.

To support the RAF in non-combat but critical areas, the Women's Auxiliary Air Force (WAAF) was established on 28 June 1939. It was established as part of the Royal Air Force to enable women to serve in various support roles in the defence of the country. It was founded on the initiative of the British government, which recognized the importance of involving women in the war effort to free up men for active combat duty. The women were involved in communications, radar surveillance, aircraft maintenance, map and aerial reconnaissance and administration, among other things. They played a crucial role in Britain's air defence, particularly during the Battle of Britain, working in radar surveillance and passing on information about enemy aircraft to the RAF.

The WAAF was hierarchically organized and closely integrated into the structures of the RAF, but had its own leadership level. The women wore uniforms and the ranks were based on the military structures of the RAF. The organization was led by high-ranking female officers, such as Katherine Trefusis Forbes, who was the first female commander of the WAAF. During the war, the WAAF grew rapidly, reaching its peak membership of around 180,000 in 1943. After the war, the WAAF was officially renamed the Women's Royal Air Force (WRAF) in 1949 and remained in existence until 1994, when it was fully integrated into the RAF.

== Warfare ==
The combat tactics for the fighters in the period up to 1939 were essentially just an extension of the practice manoeuvres. Known as “Fighting Area Attacks” (FAA), these manoeuvres were numbered in different variations to suit each anticipated combat situation. All were based on the concept of the neat, tidy and tight chain formation (Vic formation) of three fighters.

In the Battle of Britain, the Royal Air Force developed a number of defensive tactics to effectively repel the attacks of the German Luftwaffe. One of the key strategies was the so-called Dowding System, an integrated air defence system developed by Air Chief Marshal Hugh Dowding. It combined a network of radar installations, observation posts and a central command structure to detect attacks at an early stage and deploy interceptors in a targeted manner. The radar installations along the British coast, known as Chain Home, made it possible to locate enemy aircraft at a great distance. This information was forwarded to the Fighter Command Center at Bentley Priory, where it was evaluated and passed on to the fighter squadrons. The system was supplemented by ground-based observation posts that reported enemy aircraft movements at low altitudes.

The RAF deployed its fighters in small, flexible squadrons that could react quickly to enemy formations. The aircraft were staggered at different altitudes to effectively engage both bombers and escort fighters. Another important element was the introduction of the “finger-four” formation, in which four aircraft flew in a loose formation. This tactic provided pilots with better visibility and allowed for mutual cover and greater freedom of movement in aerial combat. The RAF's fighter aircraft, particularly the Spitfire and Hurricane, had specialized roles: The more manoeuvrable Spitfires focused on fighting the German Messerschmitt Bf 109 fighters, while the more stable Hurricanes targeted the slower-flying German bombers. To maintain pilot readiness, the RAF employed a rotation system in which exhausted pilots were regularly replaced by fresh forces. This ensured that pilots were not overworked and that squadron strength was maintained in the long term.

The tactics employed by Bomber Command squadrons during the Second World War can be broadly divided into three areas: those used to find and mark the target (the Pathfinders), those involving the use of electronic and radar equipment to confuse and destroy enemy defences (100 Group), and those employed by individual bomber aircraft to find their way to and from the target and evade enemy defences. Due to poor navigation and bombing accuracy in the early years of the war, senior Bomber Command commanders had concluded that special squadrons were required to carry out bombing raids.

At the beginning of the Second World War, Group Captain Syd Bufton, commander of the No. 10 Squadron, developed innovative tactics for target marking. His crews used flares to mark targets and guide other aircraft to the markers. He convinced the leadership at the Air Ministry of the need for a specialized target marking group for the entire Bomber Command. Although Arthur Harris, who took command in April 1942, rejected the idea because he was opposed to an elite unit within Bomber Command, Charles Portal, the Chief of the Air Staff, ultimately prevailed. On 17 August 1942, the Pathfinder Force (PFF) was formed, consisting of four bomber squadrons detached from various groups of Bomber Command. Over time, the original aircraft were replaced by more powerful types such as the Lancaster and the Mosquito.

The PFF had eight main tasks, which related to the aircraft rather than the crews, although experienced crews were often selected for special missions. New crews were initially deployed as supporters to increase the number of aircraft over the target area. Windowers dropped deflector material “window” to interfere with enemy radar. Backers-up, also called “Visual Centerers”, corrected the target markers by calculating the center of the impact. Route Markers marked important turning points, while Blind Illuminators marked the target with flares to support Primary Visual Markers who set their markers visually - the most challenging task. Other roles included the Blind Markers, who aimed with radar support, and the Recenterers, who corrected markers during an attack to maintain accuracy. Later, Master Bombers and Deputy Master Bombers were also introduced, who circled high above the target, gave instructions by radio and corrected errors.

The Pathfinders used three target marking methods: “Parramatta”, in which targets were marked blindly with radar (H2S or oboe); “Newhaven”, in which targets were marked visually; and “Wanganui”, in which illuminated bombs were detonated above the clouds. While Parramatta and Newhaven offered greater precision, Wanganui was considered less accurate as the bombs had to be dropped on moving tracers. The growing threat from the German night fighter defence led to the formation of the 100 (Bomber Support) Group in 1943. This specialized unit combined electronic countermeasures (Radio Countermeasures, RCM) and its own fighter aircraft to combat German night fighters. The group jammed enemy radar systems, communication channels and navigation aids to reduce bomber losses. Their aircraft were equipped with sophisticated jamming devices that generated either electronic jamming to deceive radar systems or acoustic interference to disrupt German air defence communications.

== Equipment ==
=== Flight gear ===
The equipment of RAF pilots in the Second World War was versatile and specially adapted to the different types of missions. It covered a wide range of items that were critical to the safety, navigation, communication and survival of the crews. There were significant differences between the equipment of bomber crews and fighter pilots, as their tasks and operating conditions varied greatly. Typical flying equipment for both bombers and fighters consisted of a flight suit, goggles, flight helmets made from leather, flying boots, oxygen mask, parachute and life jacket. In the event of being shot down, there were “escape boots” (a pair of walking shoes designed for use in enemy territory to avoid attracting attention with the heavy flying boots) and survival kits for the airmen. From 1940, the Irvin flight suit was introduced, which combined lifejacket and parachute harness.

==== Maps and navigation aids ====
Maps were one of the most important tools for the navigators on board bombers such as the Avro Lancaster or the Handley Page Halifax. They used detailed topographical maps showing landmarks, cities, rivers, coastlines and other prominent features. These maps were often printed on waterproof paper to protect them from moisture. In addition to standard maps, crews also used target maps that contained precise information about enemy cities or military installations. For night flights, star charts and astronomical tables were used to determine the position using the stars. Mechanical aids such as gyrocompasses, magnetic compasses and slide rules were also used to aid navigation. The gyrocompass was particularly important as it functioned independently of magnetic interference, which could be caused by the metal of the aircraft or enemy interference. In addition, navigators often carried simple rulers and course triangles with them to calculate flight routes accurately.

The RAF increasingly relied on technological innovations to facilitate navigation during long-haul flights. One important device was the Gee system, a radio navigation system that allowed crews to determine their position using radio signals. The system worked by receiving time delays between signals from several ground stations. In addition, towards the end of the war, the H2S radar system was introduced, which enabled ground-based radar imaging and made it easier for crews to recognize cities, rivers and other geographical features even in poor visibility or at night. Another important tool was the driftmeter, an optical device that allowed the navigator to measure the drift of the aircraft due to crosswinds. This device was especially crucial for long-distance flights over water or unfamiliar territory.

==== Bomb sights ====
During the war, the RAF used two types of bomb sights for its aircraft: the vector sight and the tachometric sight. The vector bombsight required the bombardier to input data before the attack, including the speed and altitude of the aircraft, the ballistic characteristics of the bomb and the estimated wind speed and direction. The bombardier was guided by a sighting cross consisting of either crossed wires or lines of light on a small reflective screen in front of him. As soon as the center of the sighting cross aligned with the target below, the bombs were dropped. Although the vector bomb sight was simple and effective, it was only as accurate as the data entered, provided the aircraft was flying straight and level towards the target. In practice, however, the data was not always accurate, and a straight and level approach in the presence of flak and fighters would have been extremely dangerous for the bomber crew.

In contrast, the tachometric bomb sight automatically calculated the wind speed and direction. A motorized telescopic sight was aimed at a stabilized glass target mounted below. The scope was connected to a gyro-stabilized platform that allowed the bombardier to observe the target as the bomb was dropped. The bombardier programmed the analogue targeting computer with the altitude of the aircraft and the ballistic characteristics of the bomb. Two electric buttons connected to an electric motor were then set so that the telescope's sighting grid was always above the target, which was viewed through the stabilized glass screen.

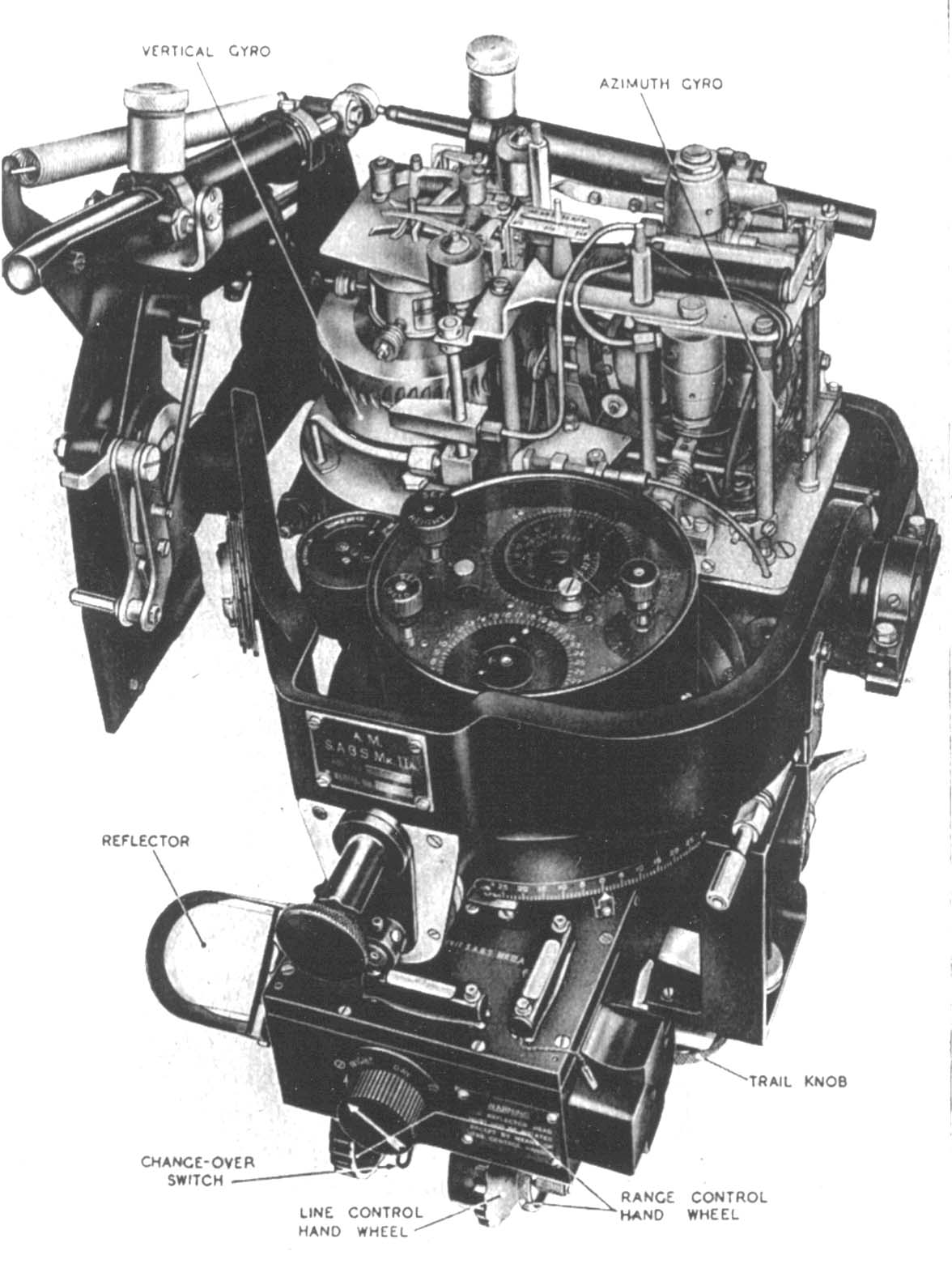
The Stabilized Automatic Bomb Sight was the RAF counterpart to the US's Norden bombsight. The bombsight proper is the clock-like device in the center, much of the framework around it is the stabilizer system that keeps it pointed at the ground while the aircraft moves

=== Machine cannons and guns ===
At the outbreak of war, most of the RAF's aircraft armament was completely obsolete, dating largely from the end of the First World War. Although the British made rapid advances in aircraft armament, the RAF lagged far behind the Luftwaffe in terms of gun effectiveness and performance. During the Second World War, the Royal Air Force used a wide range of weapons that were specially adapted to the different mission profiles of the aircraft. From machine guns in fighters and guns in bombers to rockets and numerous types of bombs. The early versions of the Spitfire and Hurricane were equipped with Browning .303 machine guns.

From the middle of the war, many fighter aircraft were equipped with 20-mm Hispano-Suiza HS.404 machine guns. These machine guns had a significantly higher penetrating power and could effectively engage both enemy aircraft and ground targets. From 1942, large-caliber guns were only used to a limited extent for special tasks. In the Middle East, the Hurricanes were equipped with 40-mm Vickers machine guns for anti-tank defence. And some Mosquito FXVIIIs of Coastal Command were fitted with 57mm 6pdr anti-ship machine guns. The RAF also used rockets from the middle of the war, especially in fighter-bombers such as the Hawker Typhoon or the Hawker Tempest, which were optimized for low-altitude missions against ground targets. The most common rockets were RP-3 (Rocket Projectile 3-inch), which were used against tanks, trains and ships. These missiles had 27-kilogram warheads and were extremely effective against heavily armoured targets.

== Aircraft ==
During World War II, the Royal Air Force commissioned the production of a wide variety of aircraft types and prototypes to meet the diverse demands of modern aerial warfare. In total, around 300 different types and variants were developed and produced:

- The Airspeed AS.10 Oxford was a twin-engine training aircraft primarily used for pilot and crew training. It accommodated a crew of two to three, reached a maximum speed of 306 km/h, and had a range of 885 km. A total of 8,586 units of this type were built.
- The Airspeed AS.51/AS.58 Horsa was an unarmed transport glider specifically designed for the movement of troops and materials. It was operated by two crew members but could not launch independently due to its design. Its range depended on the towing aircraft. A total of 3,799 units of this glider were produced.
- The Avro 652A Anson was a light, multi-role aircraft used for reconnaissance missions and training purposes. It had a crew of three to four, reached a maximum speed of 303 km/h, and had a range of 1,280 km. Its armament consisted of two 7.7 mm machine guns. A total of 10,072 units of this aircraft were produced.
- The Avro 683 Lancaster was a heavy bomber operated by a seven-man crew. With a bomb load capacity of up to 10,000 kg and a range of 4,070 km, it was one of the most effective bombers of the Royal Air Force. It had a top speed of 462 km/h, and 7,377 units were built in total.
- The Bristol Type 156 Beaufighter was a heavy fighter-bomber and night fighter operated by two crew members. It was armed with four 20 mm cannons, six 7.7 mm machine guns, as well as bombs or torpedoes. It had a range of 2,735 km, a maximum speed of 509 km/h, and a total of 5,500 units were manufactured.
- The de Havilland D.H.98 Mosquito was one of the most versatile aircraft of World War II, serving as a bomber, reconnaissance aircraft, and night fighter. With a crew of two, it reached a top speed of 668 km/h and had a range of 2,400 km. Its armament varied depending on the version and included up to four 20 mm cannons, four 7.7 mm machine guns, and a bomb load of up to 1,800 kg. Approximately 4,300 units were produced.
- The Fairey Swordfish was a carrier-based torpedo aircraft operated by two to three crew members. It reached a maximum speed of 222 km/h and had a range of 1,900 km. Its armament included a fixed 7.7 mm machine gun, a flexible machine gun, and the capability to carry a torpedo or bombs. A total of 2,391 units were built.
- The Hawker Hurricane was one of the most significant fighter aircraft of the Royal Air Force, particularly during the Battle of Britain. Operated by a single pilot, it reached a top speed of 547 km/h and had a range of 965 km. Its armament typically consisted of eight 7.7 mm machine guns, with later variants equipped with four 20 mm cannons. In total, 14,000 units were produced.
- The Supermarine Spitfire was one of the most renowned fighter aircraft of World War II and was built in numerous variants. Operated by a single pilot, it reached a top speed of 594 km/h and had a range of 750 km. Its armament varied by model and included either eight 7.7 mm machine guns or a combination of 20 mm cannons and machine guns. By October 1947, a total of 20,351 units were produced.
- The Vickers Wellington was a twin-engine medium bomber operated by a six-man crew. It could carry a bomb load of up to 4,500 kg, had a range of 3,540 km, and reached a maximum speed of 378 km/h. Its armament included six 7.7 mm machine guns. A total of 11,461 units of this bomber were manufactured.

In addition to the aircraft produced in series, numerous prototypes were developed to test new technologies, designs, and armament options. However, many of these prototypes were never mass-produced, either because they failed to meet requirements or because other models were preferred. Examples include experimental fighter aircraft like the Gloster F.9/37 or projects involving jet propulsion, such as the early Gloster E.28/39.

== Statistics ==
About 1.2 million men and women served in the RAF during the war. The RAF's total losses amounted to about 112,296 killed, wounded and missing. Bomber Command accounted for the majority of these, with about 44,000 killed and wounded. Some 121,766 aircraft were built, of which about 16,000 were lost. In return, the RAF destroyed 21,000 German aircraft and dropped 1.46 million tons of bombs on enemy territory.

== Bibliography ==
- Air Training Corps, ed. (1941). Syllabus of Training. London: HMSO.
- Armitage, M. J. (1999). The Royal Air Force. London: Cassell. ISBN 0-304-35312-4.
- Barris, Ted (2013). The great escape : a Canadian story. Toronto: Thomas Allan. ISBN 978-1-77102-272-9.
- Bowyer, Chaz (1984). Royal Air Force handbook, 1939–1945. London: I. Allan. ISBN 0-7110-1318-7.
- Bowyer, Chaz (1980). Fighter Command, 1936–1968. London: J. M. Dent. OCLC 1149041976.
- Chant, Christopher (1979). The illustrated history of the air forces of World War I & World War II. Leicester: Galley Press. ISBN 0-86136-792-8.
- Congdon, Philip (1987). Per ardua ad astra : a handbook of the Royal Air Force. Shrewsbury: Airlife. ISBN 0-906393-89-2.
- Delve, Ken (1994). The source book of the RAF. Shrewsbury: Airlife. ISBN 1-85310-451-5.
- Escott, Beryl E. (1989). Women in Air Force blue : the story of women in the Royal Air Force from 1918 to the present day. Wellingborough: P. Stephens. ISBN 1-85260-066-7.
- Falconer, Jonathan (2003). The Bomber Command handbook, 1939–1945. Stroud: Sutton. ISBN 0-7509-3171-X.
- Noble Frankland, Charles Webster, ed. (1961). Preparation. The Strategic Air Offensive Against Germany 1939–1945. Vol. I. London: HMSO.
- Central Statistical Office, ed. (1975). Statistical digest of the war. History of the second World War. London: HMSO. OCLC 1151316000.
- James, John (1990). The paladins : a social history of the RAF up to the outbreak of World War II. London: Macdonald & Co. ISBN 0-356-19071-4.
- Jewell, Brian (1981). British Battledress, 1937–1961. London: Osprey Publishing. ISBN 0-85045-387-9.
- Kingley, Oliver (2002). The RAF regiment at war, 1942–1946. Barnsley: Leo Cooper. ISBN 0-85052-852-6.
- Mason, Francis K. (1962). The Hawker Hurricane. Garden City: Doubleday & Company.
- Mondey, David (1984). Concise guide to British aircraft of World War II. London: Temple Press. OCLC 1028559946.
- Ralph, Wayne (2008). Aces, Warriors and Wingmen: The Firsthand Accounts of Canada’s Fighter Pilots in the Second World War. Wiley. ISBN 978-0-470-15814-2.
- Rexford-Welch (1954). S. C. (ed.). Administration. The Royal Air Force Medical Services. Vol. I. London: HMSO.
- Rexford-Welch (1955). S. C. (ed.). Commands. The Royal Air Force Medical Services. Vol. II. London: HMSO.
- Robinson (1982). Anthony (ed.). Aerial warfare : an illustrated history. New York: Galahad Books. ISBN 0-88365-448-2.
- Smith, David J. (1989). Britain’s military airfields, 1939–45. Wellingborough: P. Stephens. ISBN 1-85260-038-1.
- Terraine, John (1997). The right of the line : the Royal Air Force in the European War, 1939–1945. Ware: Wordsworth Editions. ISBN 1-85326-683-3.
- United Kingdom Air Ministry, ed. (1942). The King’s Regulations and Air Council Instructions for the Royal Air Force 1943. London: HMSO.
- United States. War Department, ed. (1942). Handbook on the British Army with Supplements on the Royal Air Force and Civilian Defense Organizations. Washington D.C.: United States Government Printing Office.
- Wragg, David W. (2007). RAF handbook 1939–1945. Stroud: Sutton. ISBN 978-0-7509-4361-1.
