= Nadirgul Airfield =

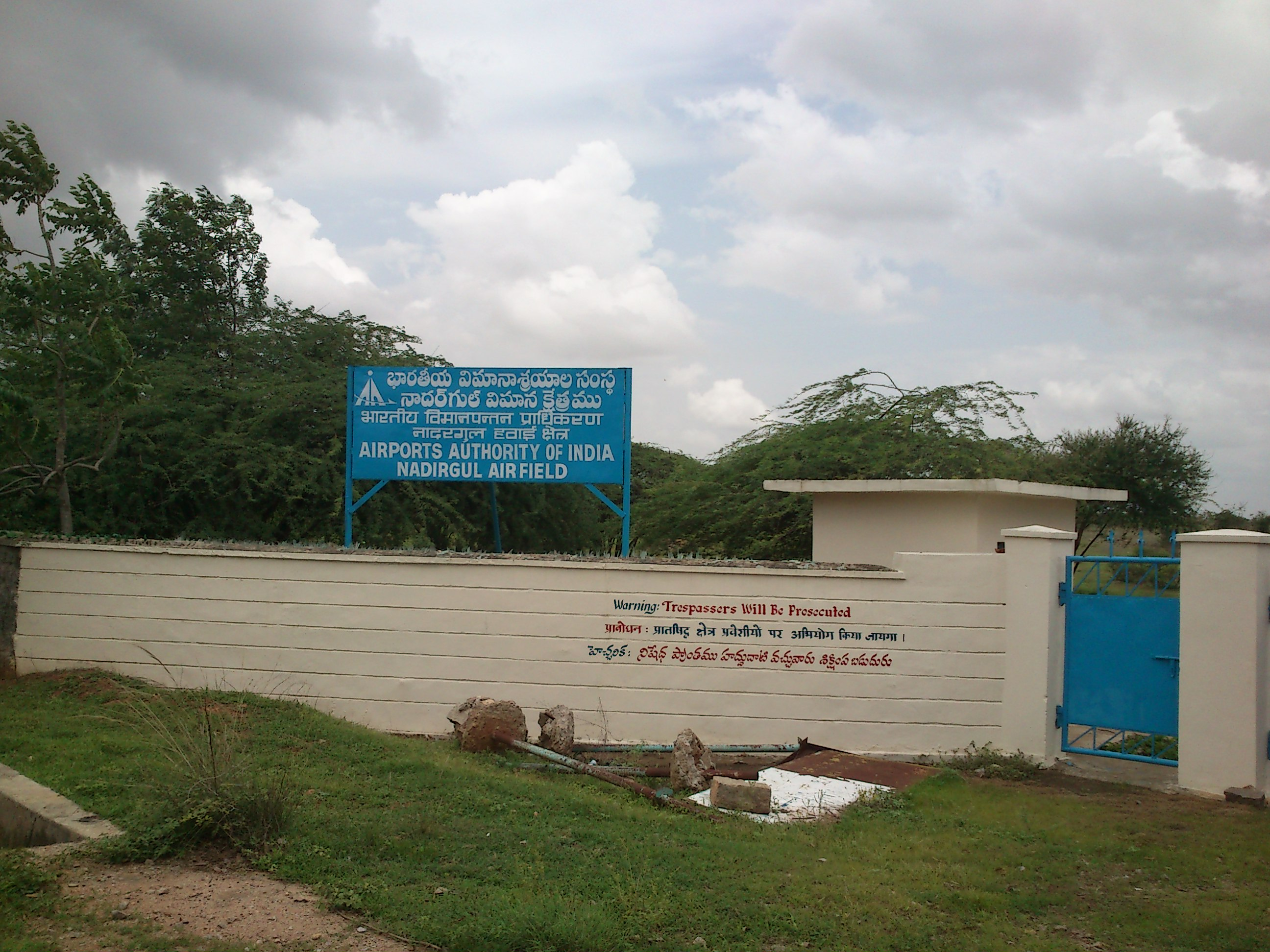
- IATA: none; ICAO: none

Summary
- Airport type: Public
- Owner: Government of India
- Operator: Airports Authority of India
- Location: Hyderabad, Telangana, India R-148 HHY VOR at 12 nm
- Elevation AMSL: 551.9 m / 1,811 ft
- Coordinates: 17°18′21″N 078°33′38″E
- Website: www.aai.aero/allAirports/nadirgul.jsp
- Interactive map of Nadirgul Airfield

Runways
Direction	Length		Surface
Direction	m	ft	Surface
14/32	914	3,000	?

Nadirgul Airfield is located 12 nm south-east of Hyderabad on the Nagarjuna Sagar Highway. This airfield primarily supports pilot training. The Telangana State Aviation Academy (TSAA), Flytech Aviation Academy and the Rajiv Gandhi Aviation Academy (RGAA) use this field to train pilots. Flytech Aviation has its own hangar at Nadirgul. Nadirgul is classified to Visual meteorological conditions (VMC). It has no instrument approach procedure, no PAPI or VASI, or any landing aids such as REIL, REL, ALS, or taxiway lights.

The airfield has only one runway 14/32. Trainees mostly fly single engined aircraft like the Cessna 152 and Cessna 172. The circuit altitude is 2600' and the pattern is South of the field as North of Nadirgul is a residential area. For all practical purposes, METAR and TAFOR issued for Rajiv Gandhi International Airport (RGIA) are used. Also, there is no dedicated air traffic control at the airfield, but ATC duties are carried out by flying school trainees. After the opening of RGIA at Shamshabad, all pilot training activity was to be shifted to the Begumpet Airport. However, Nadirgul remains active in service.
