= Ranchi Metropolitan Region =

- Metropolitan Area
- Country: India
- State: Jharkhand
- District: Ranchi

Area
  - Metro: 4,587 km^{2} (1,771 sq mi)

Population (2011 Census)
  - Metro: 2,896,677
  - Metro density: 631.5/km^{2} (1,636/sq mi)
- Time zone: UTC+5.30 (IST)

Ranchi Metropolitan Region, also known as the Ranchi Metropolitan Area and Greater Ranchi, is the Urban Agglomeration of Ranchi in the Indian state of Jharkhand. The area is administered by the Ranchi Regional Development Authority (RRDA).

== Demographics ==
According to the 2011 census data, the total population of the Ranchi metropolitan region was 28,96,677. RDDA report states the total area is 4,587 km^{2}.

== See also ==
- Ranchi district
