= Lalitpur Airport =

Upcoming airport in Lalitpur, Uttar Pradesh, India

- IATA: none; ICAO: none

Summary
- Airport type: Public
- Owner: Airports Authority of India
- Operator: Airports Authority of India
- Serves: Lalitpur
- Location: Lalitpur, Uttar Pradesh, India
- Elevation AMSL: 360 m (1,180 ft)
- Coordinates: 24°43′2.952″N 78°24′53.507″E

Map
- Location of airport in Uttar Pradesh Lalitpur Airport (India)

Lalitpur Airport is a proposed domestic airport and defunct airstrip in Lalitpur, Uttar Pradesh, India owned by the Airports Authority of India.

390 acres of land was marked for the proposed airport.

== History ==
An Airstrip was built during World War 2 in Lalitpur, but has been defunct ever since. The state government had plans twice to develop the existing airstrip into an airport as there is a large amount of land around the airport. It is owned by the central government's Airports Authority of India. Under the state's current chief minister Yogi Adityanath, the Uttar Pradesh Government gave approval for the development of an airport in Lalitpur in March 2021. A previous attempt by former chief minister of Uttar Pradesh, Akhilesh Yadav was made to develop the airstrip but the plans never took off.
