= Shella Airport =

Airport in Meghalaya, India

- IATA: none; ICAO: none

Summary
- Airport type: Public
- Operator: Airports Authority of India
- Serves: Shella, Meghalaya, India
- Elevation AMSL: 24 m / 80 ft
- Coordinates: 25.57°N 91.87°E

Map
- Location of the airport in Meghalaya Shella Airport (India)

Runways
Direction	Length		Surface
Direction	m	ft	Surface
05/23	914	3,000	Asphalt

Shella Airport is a small airport located in the Shella, in the Indian state of Meghalaya. It is located about 3 km from Shella Bholaganj town, in the Meghalaya state of India.

== Features ==
The airport has a single domestic terminal with a very small peak hour passenger handling capacity. The maximum terminal capacity for arrival and departure is 20 passengers.

There is no scheduled commercial air service in this Airport at this time.

The airport was opened for bidding after remaining non-operational.

== Specifications ==
The airport is at an elevation of 80 feet (24.3 m) above mean sea level. It has one paved runway designated 05/23 which measures 3,000 by 100 feet (914 m × 30 m). The Airport is managed and controlled by Airports Authority of India (AAI).
