= Birsa Munda Airport =

Airport serving Ranchi, Jharkhand, India

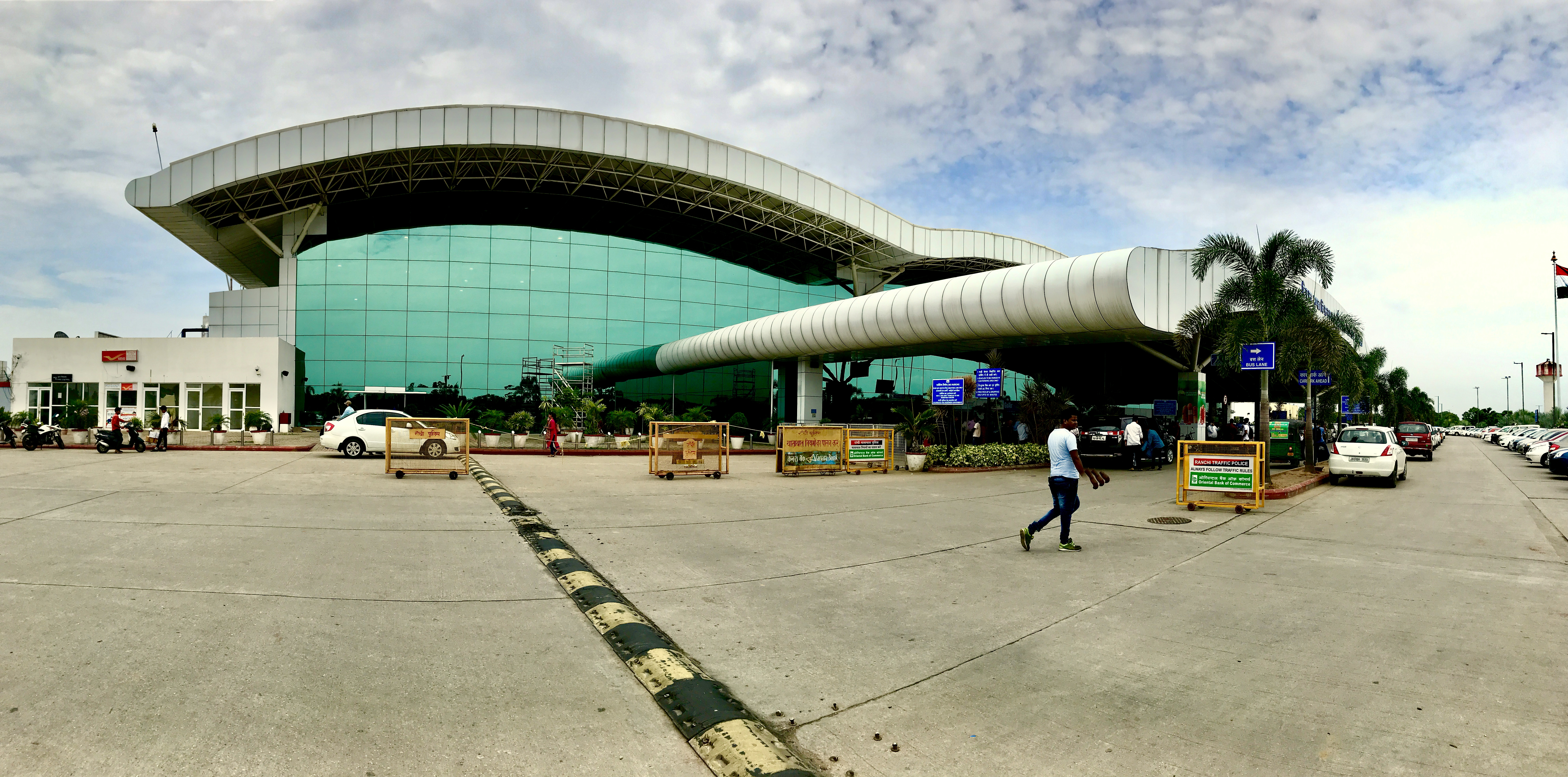
- IATA: IXR; ICAO: VERC

Summary
- Airport type: Public
- Operator: Airports Authority of India
- Serves: Ranchi Metropolitan Region
- Location: Hinoo, Ranchi, Jharkhand, India
- Elevation AMSL: 646 m (2,119 ft)
- Coordinates: 23°18′51″N 085°19′18″E
- Website: Birsa Munda Airport

Maps
- Location of airport in Jharkhand IXR (India)
- Interactive map of Birsa Munda Airport

Runways
Direction	Length		Surface
Direction	m	ft	Surface
13/31	2,748	9,016	Asphalt

Helipads
Number	Length		Surface
Number	m	ft	Surface
H1	19	63	Asphalt

Statistics (April 2025 – March 2026)
- Passengers: 27,01,796 (▲5.2%)
- Aircraft movements: 18,393 (▼ -4.8%)
- Cargo tonnage: 7,741 (▲16.2%)
- Source: AAI

Birsa Munda Airport (IATA: IXR, ICAO: VERC) is a domestic airport serving Ranchi, the capital city of Jharkhand, India. It is named after the famous Indian tribal freedom fighter, Birsa Munda, and is currently managed by the Airports Authority of India. The airport is located in Hinoo, approximately 5 km (3.1 mi) from the city center and sprawls over an area of 1,568 acres. It is used by more than 2.5 million passengers annually and is the 29th-busiest airport in India.

== History ==
The Airport was built in the year 1941, by the British to serve the Royal Airforce, United Kingdom's Aerial Warfare Force. After Independence, in the year 1949, 546.25 acres of the airport was converted into a Civil Aerodrome.

== Terminals ==
=== Integrated terminal ===
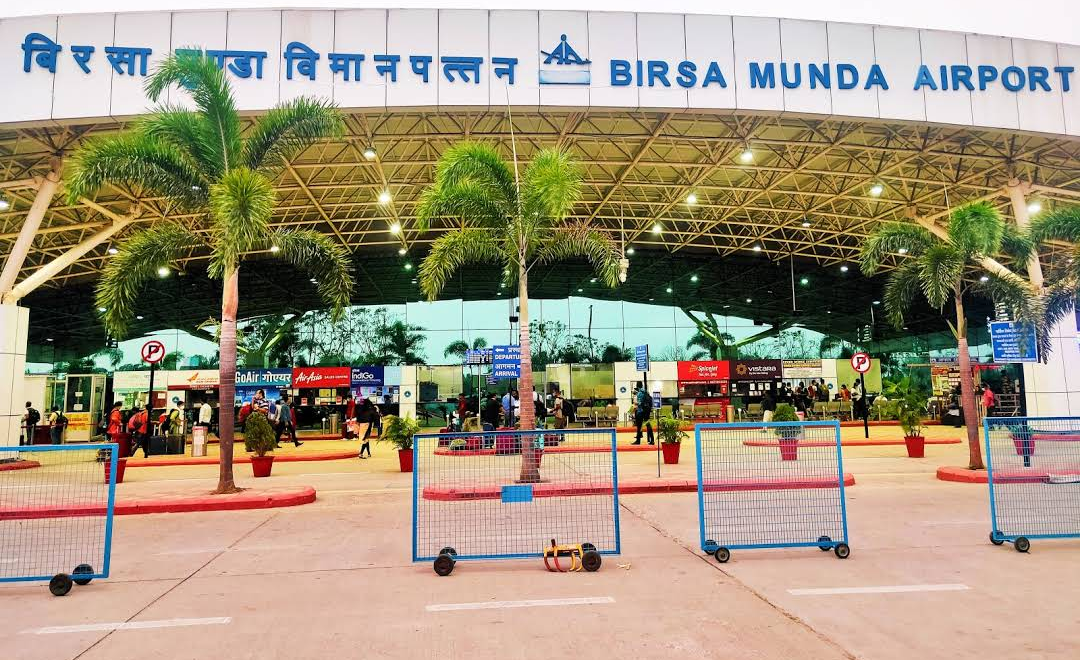
Front view of the airport's terminal

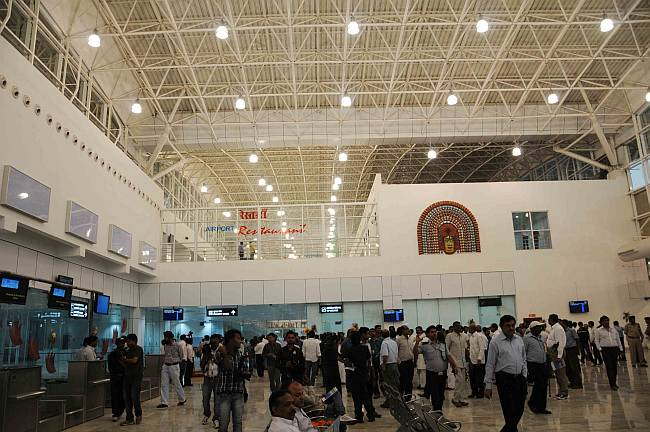
Interior of the terminal

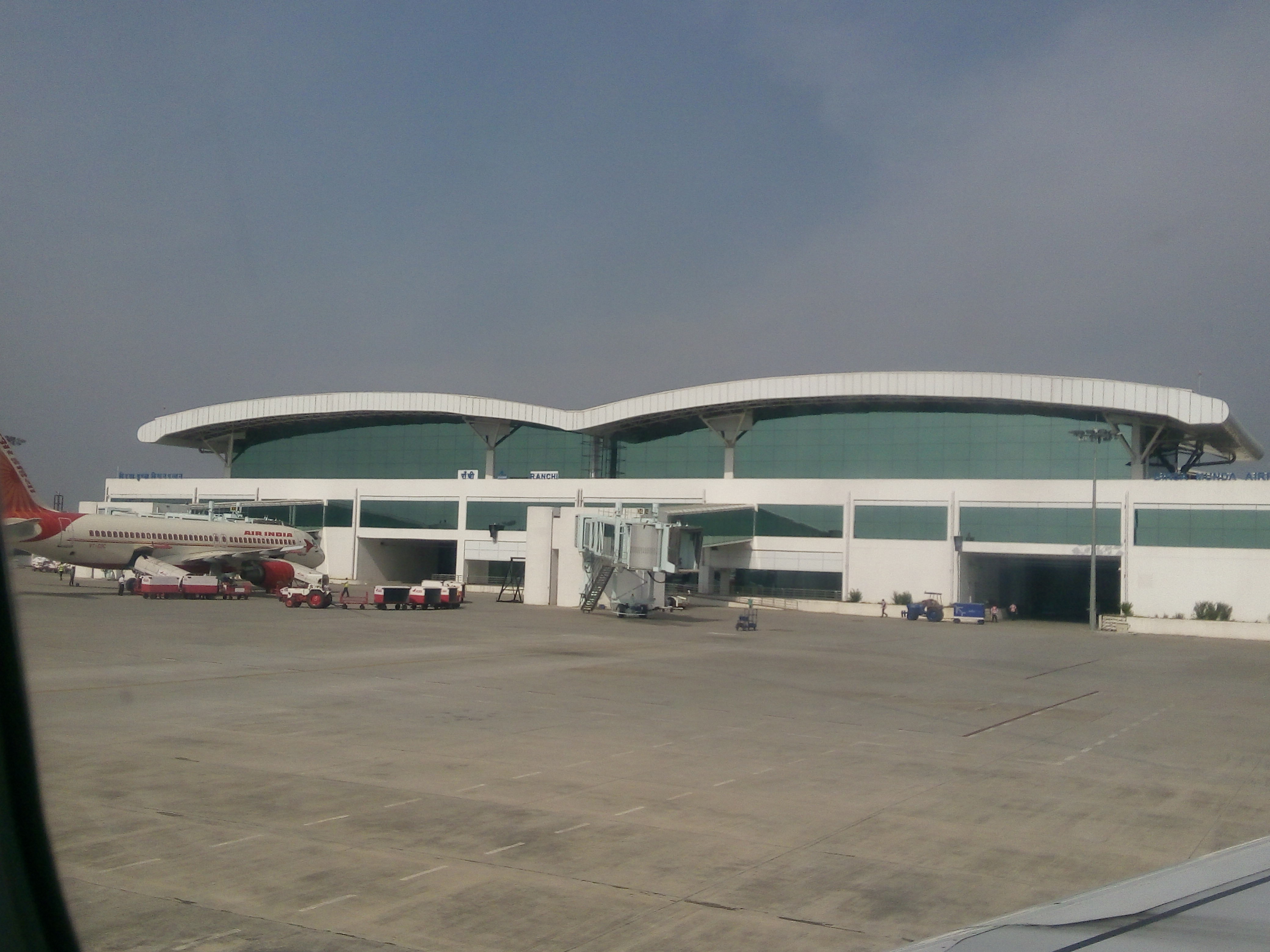
View of the terminal from the apron

The new integrated passenger terminal building at the airport was inaugurated by the then civil aviation minister Ajit Singh on 24 March 2013.

The terminal building spreads over 19,600 square metres (0.0196 km^{2}) and was constructed at a cost of ₹138 crore (equivalent to ₹256 crore or US$27 million in 2026). It has four aerobridges and six escalators imported from China, Germany and Singapore. The terminal has a capacity to handle 500 domestic and 200 international passengers at a time.

In March 2013, the tax on aviation turbine fuel sold at the airport was reduced from 20% to 4% to attract more airlines to the city. Overnight parking of aircraft at the airport was made free-of-charge to encourage airlines to schedule their aircraft to remain overnight, so that there may be more early-morning flights to the metro cities. The Airports Authority of India also constructed three more parking bays, thereby making it the first tier-II airport in India to have eight aircraft parking bays. Two new aerobridges were added to the terminal and the runway was extended as well.

=== Cargo terminal ===
A new cargo terminal was inaugurated in February 2017 by the then Chief Minister of Jharkhand, Raghubar Das. The terminal can handle 50 metric tonnes (mT) of cargo everyday and is equipped with explosive trace detection equipment, cargo X-ray machines, hardware security machines, and CCTV cameras.

=== Expansion and modernisation ===
Though footfall of the passengers have gone up over the years, the airport is yet acquire an international tag for want of additional infrastructure like extended runway, runway strip extension, extra parking bays, an isolation bay, spacious terminal building and more aerobridges to qualify as international airport. Therefore signing of a long-pending Memorandum of Understanding (MoU) between Airport Authority of India and Jharkhand Government for transfer of 303.62 acre land taken place on 27 June 2022.

As per the MoU, a total of 303.62 acres of land will be transferred to the AAI by the State Government, of which 301.12 acres will be transferred in the first phase. Of the 301.12 acres, which has been acquired by the Government, 273.78 acres of land will be made available on lease for 30 years at the rate of Rs 1.00 per annum. The remaining 27.34 acres of land will be provided free of cost on the basis of ownership to replace it with 27.31 acres of land of the army.

Deputy Secretary, Civil Aviation Division, Government of Jharkhand, Akhilesh Kumar Sinha & Airport Director, Birsa Munda Airport, KL Agrawal exchanged the signed deal for land transfer.

AAI officials said that a new terminal building, isolation bay, control tower, fire station, etc. will also be built on the additional land apart from expanding the runway to 3,655 metres from the existing 2,748 metres and widening the runway strip to 60 metres from the existing 45 metres. The necessary navigational aids, visual aids and ground lighting facilities will be upgraded for the operation of wide-body aircraft. Additional land near the airstrip would allow belly landing of aircraft in emergency situation.

Officials of the Civil Aviation Department said that the State Government would also expand its hangar on the Birsa Munda airport campus to facilitate parking of extra planes and helicopters.

Officials of the Airport Authority of India (AAI), Ranchi, said that the long-delayed plan of expansion of the airport got underway after the signing of agreement with the State Government on 27 June. “The agreement was due to be signed in 2008, but the issue lingered for long due to one pretext or the other,” said an officer.

A new 35.45 meter high control tower was operationalised.

On 26 March 2025, a high-level meeting was conducted under the chairmanship of the Principal Secretary, Government of Jharkhand, to discuss the development of Birsa Munda Airport & Dhalbhumgarh Airport. Mrs. Nivedita Dubey, Regional Executive Director, Eastern Region, AAI, attended the meeting along with other senior officials of AAI.

== Facilities ==
=== Runway ===
Runway at Birsa Munda Airport
Runway Number	Length	Width	Approach Lights/ILS
13/31	2,748 m (9,016 ft)	45 m (148 ft)	CAT I / CAT I

== Airlines and destinations ==
Airlines	Destinations
Air India Express	Bengaluru, Delhi, Hyderabad, Mumbai
IndiGo	Ahmedabad, Bengaluru, Bhubaneswar, Chennai, Delhi, Hyderabad, Kolkata, Lucknow, Mumbai, Navi Mumbai, Patna, Pune

== Accidents and incidents ==
- 19 October 2011: A Dhruv owned by the Border Security Force (BSF), operated for the Ministry of Home Affairs (MHA) and maintained and operated by the Pawan Hans crashed 40 km (25 mi) from the Khakra village while en-route from Ranchi aerodrome to Chaibasa. The pilots, Captain Thomas and Captain S.P. Singh, and technician Manoj Soin was killed in the accident. It was the fourth Pawan Hans helicopter to crash within a year. The helicopter took off from 03:09 UTC and crashed after six minutes, around 10 nmi (19 km; 12 mi) from Ranchi. The airframe was lost in the post crash fire.
- 23 February 2026: A Beechcraft King Air C90 air ambulance (registration VT-AJV), operated by Redbird Airways Pvt Ltd, crashed in a dense forest near Simaria in Jharkhand's Chatra district. The aircraft had departed Birsa Munda Airport at 7:11 PM IST, bound for Indira Gandhi International Airport in New Delhi for a medical evacuation. At 7:34 PM, after establishing contact with Kolkata ATC, the crew requested a route deviation due to severe weather and thunderstorms. Shortly thereafter, the aircraft lost radar and radio contact. All seven people on board were killed, including the pilot, co-pilot, a doctor, a paramedic, a 41-year-old burn patient, and two attendants. The DGCA and the AAIB have launched a formal investigation into the crash.

== See also ==
- List of busiest airports in India
- List of airports in Jharkhand
- Dhalbhumgarh Airport
- Sonari Airport
