= Dr. Bhimrao Ambedkar Airstrip =

Airstrip in Meerut, India

- IATA: none; ICAO: VI2B

Summary
- Airport type: Public
- Owner: Airports Authority of India
- Serves: Meerut
- Location: Meerut, Uttar Pradesh, India
- Elevation AMSL: 732 ft (223 m)
- Coordinates: 28°54′18″N 077°40′37″E

Map
- Location within Uttar Pradesh Location within India

Runways
Direction	Length		Surface
Direction	ft	m	Surface
11/29	5,124	1,562	Asphalt

Dr. Bhimrao Ambedkar Airstrip is an airstrip-aerodrome, situated between Partapur and Gagol villages south of Meerut city in Uttar Pradesh state of India. The airstrip has only non-scheduled chartered flights.

== Background ==
=== Etymology ===
It is named after B. R. Ambedkar.

=== History ===
In 2012, Airports Authority of India (AAI) presented a master plan to the state government in April seeking the transfer of the airstrip and additional 427 acre land free of cost and free from all encumbrances for the expansion of the Airport. The Uttar Pradesh cabinet approved to hand over the airstrip AAI in September 2013. In February 2014, the government of Uttar Pradesh signed a MoU with the AAI for the development of this airport, on the fringes of the national capital region to cater to the Western Uttar Pradesh and Uttarakhand especially in view of the burgeoning air traffic at Delhi airport.

== Details ==
=== Existing ===
The existing airstrip is spread across 47 acres.

=== Expansion plan ===
Airport will be expanded in 3 phases:

- Phase-1: Additional 96 acres land is needed for expansion of runway to accommodate 72-seater plane, e.g. ATR 72.
- Phase-2: 300 acre land will be needed.
- Phase-3: 200 acre land will be needed.

== Current status ==
- Phase-1
  - 2025 Aug: phase-1 expansion plan approved by AAI, 75 acres out of 96 acres land need has been acquired, remaining 21 owned by farmers are under litigation due to non-payment to the farmers which is being resolved.
- Phase-2:
  - 2025 Aug: approval by AAI is awaited, 65% of 300 acre land needed is owned by various government departments, the rest is being acquired from the farmers.
- Phase-3:
  - 2025 Aug: not yet approved by AAI.

== See also ==
- Airports in Delhi NCR with scheduled commercial flights
- Delhi NCR Transport Plan
