= Dumka Airport =

Airport in Dumka, Jharkhand, India

- IATA: none; ICAO: VEDK

Summary
- Airport type: Private/Military
- Owner: Government of Jharkhand
- Operator: Airports Authority of India
- Serves: Dumka
- Location: Dumka
- Coordinates: 24°13′54.3″N 087°16′04.2″E

Map
- Location within Jharkhand Location within India

Runways
Direction	Length		Surface
Direction	ft	m	Surface
09/27	3,963	1,208	Asphalt

Dumka Airport (IATA: none, ICAO: VEDK), also known as Sido Kanhu Airport, is a private airport and a military base that is located in Dumka, Jharkhand, India. The airport currently does not have any scheduled commercial services and is used only by gliders, private companies and government aircraft. Scheduled services were to begin to the state capital Ranchi under the government's UDAN scheme. The airport's expansion is underway for the commencement of scheduled passenger services. There are also plans to use the facility for training pilots. On 27 March 2025, An Communications, Navigation, and Surveillance (CNS) & Air Traffic Management (ATM) agreement has been signed between the Civil Aviation Department, Govt of Jharkhand, and Airport Authority of India paving the way for enhanced operational readiness.

== See also ==
- Birsa Munda Airport
- Deoghar Airport
