= Dhalbhumgarh Airport =

- IATA: none; ICAO: none

Summary
- Airport type: Public
- Owner: Dhalbhumgarh Airport Limited (DAL): Airports Authority of India (51%); Government of Jharkhand (49%)
- Operator: Airports Authority of India
- Serves: Jamshedpur
- Location: Dhalbhumgarh, East Singhbhum district, Jharkhand
- Elevation AMSL: 413 ft (126 m)
- Coordinates: 22°31′25″N 086°33′44″E

Map
- Location within Jharkhand Location within India

Runways
Direction	Length		Surface
Direction	ft	m	Surface
01/19	5,712	1,741	Concrete
13/31	5,810	1,771	Concrete

Dhalbhumgarh Airport (IATA: none, ICAO: none) is a proposed domestic airport, which will serve the city of Jamshedpur, Jharkhand, India. It will be built on a former World War II era airfield in Dhalbhumgarh in East Singhbhum district, about 60 km (37 mi) from Jamshedpur. The Government of Jharkhand and the Airports Authority of India (AAI) signed a Memorandum of Understanding (MoU) for the construction of the airport on 24 January 2019. Under the MoU, a joint venture company would be set up to construct the airport. The project was initially expected to be completed by December 2020.

Due to delays and the COVID-19 pandemic, the airport was expected to open by 2022, but construction had not started yet. However, in December 2022, land acquisition for a 3.5 km link road connecting to the airport was started and the construction of the approach Road for Airport was completed in July 2023. The construction of the airport is expected to start once it receives necessary forest clearance from the Ministry of Environment, Forest and Climate Change, Govt of India, which is still under progress. Once completed, it will become the main airport for Jamshedpur and adjoining regions, by replacing the existing Sonari Airport.

== History ==
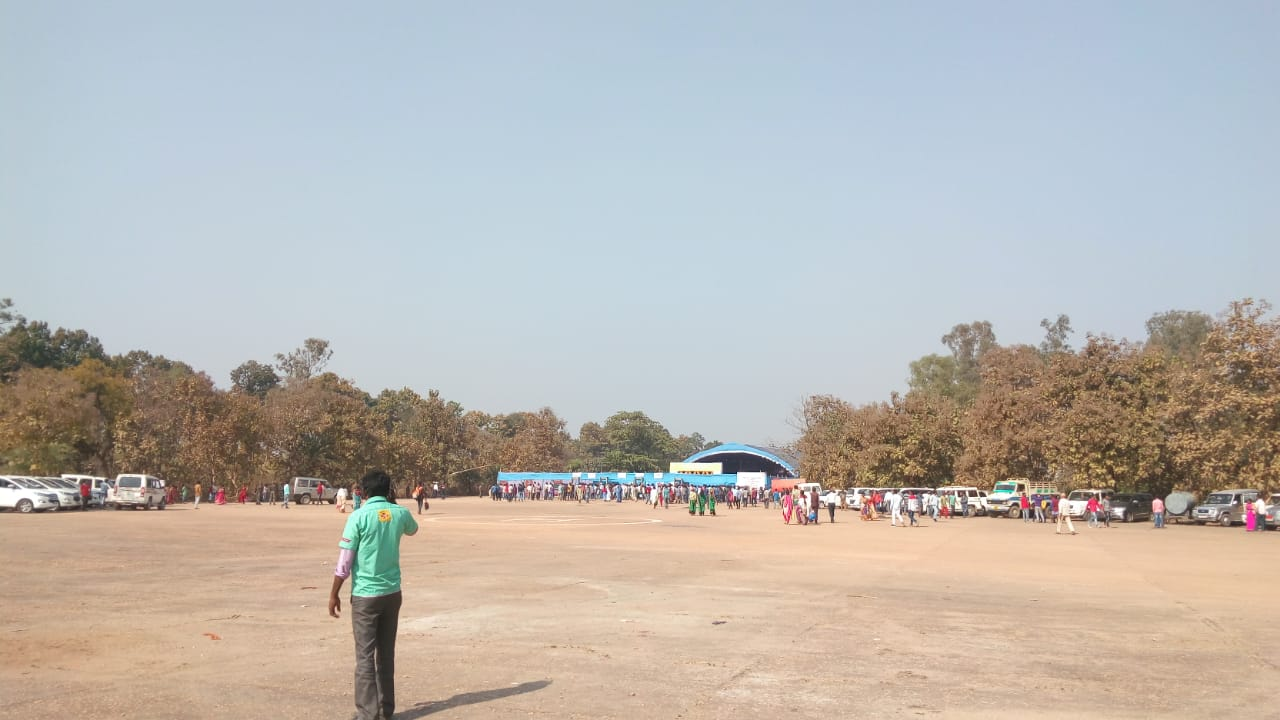
Airport site during the Groundbreaking Ceremony

The former airfield was built in 1942, during World War II, as an ancillary runway for other airfields in the vicinity that were being built around India's eastern frontier as part of the war effort. It was one of the airfields used by allied forces to repel the advancing Japanese troops and to maintain transport links with China. As the Japanese forces came to control shipping in the South China Sea, seaborne supply routes to China were cut, and the difficult, 500 km (310 mi) route over the Himalayas, was increasingly used. The airfield was abandoned after the war. Currently, there are two Runways vis 01/19 with dimensions 1741 m x 45 m & 13/31 with dimensions 1771 m x45 m. The surface of runway is not suitable for operations. No other facility are available at the airport.

The airport was to have 3 km long runway. The AAI had planned to invest ₹ 300 crores for the new airport and the state was to provide 300 acres of land for the project. The then Chief Minister of Jharkhand, Raghubar Das, performed the ground breaking ceremony of the airport project on 24 January 2019 and the Government signed the MoU with the AAI on the same day. Under the MoU, a joint venture company would be set up to construct the airport, in which AAI would have a 51 percent stake, while the State Government would own the remaining. According to the memorandum, AAI would invest ₹ 100 crores to construct the airport while the State would provide the land required for the project. It will be built in two phases. The first phase will have an area of 240 acres and the runway of 1,745 metres along with a terminal building, an Air Traffic Control (ATC) tower, Fire Station and a terminal building will be built. The runway will handle ATR-72 type aircraft. The terminal building, measuring 15,000 square feet, will have six check-in counters and will be able to handle 150 passengers during peak hours. The runway will be extended to 2,179 metres to handle Airbus A320 and Boeing 737 type aircraft as part of the first phase. In the second phase, an additional 545 acres would be acquired to increase the runway length to operate larger aircraft, along with the expansion of the terminal to handle more traffic. The runway will be expanded to 4,400 metres, making it capable for handling Airbus A380 and Boeing 747 type aircraft.

== Project timeline ==
- June 2017: The technical team of the Airports Authority of India (AAI) scouted the region for a suitable location for an airport for Jamshedpur and visited Chakulia and Dhalbhumgarh. After considering all factors, the team chose the Dhalbhumgarh site for the airport. The AAI decided to invest ₹ 100 crores to construct the airport while the State would provide the land required for the project. It will be built in two phases.
- September 2017: The Ministry of Defence had staked its claim over more than half of the airport project land that was owned by the government.
- September 2018: The Ministry of Defence gave clearance to the Ministry of Civil Aviation for the construction of the proposed airport.
- January 2019: The then Chief Minister of Jharkhand, Raghubar Das, and the Minister of State (Civil Aviation), Jayant Sinha and Jamshedpur MP, Bidyut Baran Mahato, performed the groundbreaking ceremony of the airport project on 24 January 2019, and the Government of Jharkhand signed the MoU with the AAI on the same day.
- December 2019: On 26 December, the Expert Appraisal Committee (EAC) under the Ministry of Environment, Forest and Climate Change suggested that creation of an airport at a site nearer to Jamshedpur will be better for the people of the city, by at first, knowing the site's pros and cons before starting construction. However, the EAC after detailed deliberation upon the proposal asked the project proponent (AAI) to submit a revised pre-feasibility study report, as well as in view of the foregoing observations, the EAC recommended to defer the proposal for the construction of an airport. The proposal shall be reconsidered after the revised pre-feasibility study report is submitted to the committee.
- August 2022: Site Inspection of the proposed airport was conducted from 22 March 2022 to 10 June 2022, and since the airport will be an infrastructure along the National Highway, it can boost the economies of Ghatsila, Musabani and Chakulia. Therefore, the proposal may be implemented in the wider interest of the population living around the site.
- December 2022: Land acquisition for a 3.5 km link road connecting to the airport started.
- January 2023: The airport project has hit a roadblock with the forest department, which did not accept to give a No Objection Certificate (NOC) necessary for its construction, because the former airfield lies in a deep forest area known as the Elephant Corridor, and if the airport is built, it may affect and harm the environment in the region.
- March 2023: The AAI has decided to the dissolution of the Dhalbhumgarh Airport Limited and sent letter to the Government of Jharkhand for the consent as per the procedure. Response is awaited from the State Government in this regard.
- April 2023: On 3 April during laying the foundation stone of the expansion project of the Tinplate Company, the Chief Minister Hemant Soren said that the state government is brainstorming about the airport in Jamshedpur. He said that he himself is worried about it. The current airstrip can be used. This will be suitable for passenger aircraft, cargo aircraft should be started from there, the process of negotiation is going on with the central government. He will talk to the central Govt on this Matter. Later on the next day i.e., on 4 April Ranchi Airport authorities through their official Twitter Handle said on the matter related to delay in getting Forest Clearance that "Matter is being pursued with State Govt of Jharkhand for either to get forest clearance at the earliest or dropping the project".
- May 2023: The Construction of (3.5 km) Airport Approach Road achieves 92% physical progress : Road Construction Department (RCD), Govt of Jharkhand.
- July 2023: The Construction of (3.5 km) Airport Approach Road was completed : Circle Officer, Dhalbhumgarh. Whereas, the Principal Chief Conservator of Forests (PCCF) Sanjay Srivastava says that Forest Clearance on the matter of Airport construction has not been given yet. Investigation is going on regarding the presence of Elephant Corridor, discussions are also going on on some points. The report will be submitted to the government as soon as the investigation is completed.
- February 2024: Gram Sabha will soon be held in Dhalbhumgarh. The administration is taking help from local Panchayat representatives to resolve the airport land dispute. Seeing the positive attitude of the villagers of Dhalbhumgarh, the administration will fix the day of Gram Sabha : Government Sources.
- March 2024: The Principal Chief Conservator of Forests & Executive Director of Waste Land Development Board of Jharkhand Forest, Shashikar Samanta on 20 March recommends diversion of 99.256 Hectares of Forest Land for the Stage - I Forest Clearance.
- June 2024: As per our records, Ministry has not received any Environment Clearance proposal and related issues for the construction of Airport : Ministry of Environment, Forest and Climate Change, Government of India.
- July 2024: On 11 July, A team of AAI from Birsa Munda Airport, Ranchi and Eastern Regional Headquarters, Kolkata, West Bengal visited the Dhalbhumgarh & Chakulia Airstrip for the land survey. They will submit a report to the Airport Authority of India's Headquarter, New Delhi. On very next Day, Captain SP Sinha, Director of Operations, Civil Aviation Division, Government of Jharkhand has written a letter to District Commissioner Ananya Mittal requesting the Forest Department to provide compensatory land for the Airport. on 24 July, The Forest, Environment and Climate Change Department, Government of Jharkhand, Jalaj Kumar recommends diversion of 99.256 Hectares of Forest Land for the Stage - I Forest Clearance.
- August 2024: The Forest Conservation Division of Ministry of Environment, Forest and Climate Change, Government of India issues the notice related to 6th Meeting of Forest Advisory Committee (FAC) for year 2024 which is to be held on 27 August 2024. Forest Clearance (Stage-I) proposal for construction of Airport on forest land is to be discussed in this meeting. The Ministry returns the Forest Clearance proposal to the State Government and sought some essential details and clarifications before the grant of Stage - I Forest Clearance. The MoEF&CC, Govt of India also clarifies in its DSS Analysis Report that the proposed site does not fall under any Elephant Corridor and the said corridor is situated at a distance of 9.69 km and 14.61 km.
- March 2025: A high-level meeting was conducted under the chairmanship of the Principal Secretary, Govt. of Jharkhand, to discuss the development of Birsa Munda Airport and Dhalbhumgarh Airport. Mrs. Nivedita Dubey, Regional Executive Director, Eastern Region, AAI, attended the meeting along with other senior officials of AAI : Ranchi Airport.
- April 2025: Efforts are being made at both central and state levels to remove hurdles in the airport's construction. This will bring positive results : Ananya Mittal, District Commissioner, East Singhbhum. Recently, Deputy Commissioner chaired a virtual review meeting to accelerate land acquisition and instructed the Divisional Forest Officer (DFO) to promptly submit all required documents and reports to expedite approvals from both the Central and State Governments for the project.
- May 2025: On 4 May, SDO Ghatsila conducted meeting with two pending Villages for their consent in Gram Sabha. The villagers rejected the Airport Project. The Sub Divisional Officer, Ghatsila said that they will propose the Airport at 230 Acres of Forest Land instead of 240 Acres as proposed earlier.
- March 2026 : The Chief Minister is personally monitoring the Dhalbhumgarh Airport Project and that progress will be seen soon : President of Singhbhum Chamber of Commerce & Industries. Whereas, Additional District Commissioner of East Singhbhum informs that the Circle Officer, Dhalbhumgarh has reported that due to strong opposition from the villagers, the Gram Sabha is not possible there. This has been reported earlier also.
- June 2026 : A review meeting regarding the development of the airport project was held on 09.06.2026 under the chairmanship of the Additional Chief Secretary, Cabinet Secretariat and Monitoring Department (Civil Aviation Division), Jharkhand, Ranchi. The Principal Chief Conservator of Forests, Nodal-cum-Executive Director, directed the DFO, Jamshedpur, to provide an updated report regarding the 19-point EDS, mostly related to the Forest Department, after a thorough review of the report on all points. The selected consultant has been directed to coordinate with all relevant offices, prepare a consolidated report, and upload it to the PARIVESH Portal for the Ministry of Environment, Forest and Climate Change, Government of India, New Delhi, as soon as possible.
- November 2026 : The Ministry of Environment, Forest, and Climate Change (MoEF&CC) of Central Government has granted conditional forest clearance for the diversion of 99.256 hectares of land required for the airport's construction following an site inspection was done on 04th - 05th of November. The site inspection report has been forwarded by the Integrated Regional Office (IRO) to the central headquarters in New Delhi for final Stage-I Forest Clearance Approval.
