= List of airports in Odisha =

This includes a list of airports in Odisha, India, including commercially used airfields, former airfields, flying schools and military bases. This list contains the following information:

- **City served** - The city generally associated with the airport. This is not always the actual location since some airports are located in smaller towns outside the city they serve.
- **ICAO** - The location indicator assigned by the International Civil Aviation Organization (ICAO)
- **IATA** - The airport code assigned by the International Air Transport Association (IATA)
- **Airport name** - The official airport name. Those shown in bold indicate the airport has scheduled service on commercial airlines.
- Note - Specific information related to the airport

Role of airport
Role	Description
International	Handles international flights
Customs	Airports with customs checking and clearance facilities handling international flights but not elevated to international airport status.
Domestic	Handles domestic flights
Civil enclave	Civil enclave at a military airfield
General aviation	No scheduled commercial flights
Military	Defence purposes
Flying school	Training purposes
Public	State owned
Private	Privately owned
Future	Project proposed or under construction
Closed	No longer in operation

Commercial service	Airport has commercial service
Commercial service	Airport has no commercial service

== List ==
List of airports in Odisha
Location	Airport	ICAO	IATA	Operator	Category	Role
Angul	Savitri Jindal Airport	VEAL	—	Jindal Steel and Power	Private	Private
Balangir	Tusura Airstrip	VETS	—	Government of Odisha	Public	Flying School
Barbil	Barbil Tonto Airstrip	VEBL	—	Jindal Steel and Power	Public	Private
Dhamra	Dhamra Airstrip	—	—	Dhamra Port Company	Public	Private
Bargarh	Satibhata Airstrip	VEPP	—	Government of Odisha	Public	Non-operational
Baripada	Rasgovindpur Airstrip	—	—	Indian Air Force	Military	Closed
Bhawanipatna	Utkela Airport	VEUK	UKE	Airports Authority of India	Domestic	Commercial
Bhubaneswar	Biju Patnaik International Airport	VEBS	BBI	Airports Authority of India	International	Commercial
Brahmapur	Rangeilunda Airport	VEBM	—	Airports Authority of India	Domestic	Non-operational
Cuttack	Charbatia Air Base	VE62	—	Aviation Research Centre	Military	Military
Dhenkanal	Birasal Airstrip	—	—	Government of Odisha	Public	Flying School
Jajpur	Sukinda Airstrip	—	—	Tata Steel	Private	Private
Jeypore	Jeypore Airport	VEJP	PYB	Airports Authority of India	Domestic	Commercial
Jharsuguda	Jharsuguda Airport	VEJH	JRG	Airports Authority of India	Domestic	Commercial
Kendujhar	Raisuan Airstrip	VEKJ	—	Government of Odisha	Public	Non-operational
Lanjigarh	Lanjigarh Airstrip	—	—	Vedanta Resources	Private	Private
Malkangiri	Malkangiri Airport	—	—	Airports Authority of India	Public	Non-operational
Nuapada	Nuapada Airstrip	VENP	—	Government of Odisha	Public	Non-operational
Phulbani	Gudari Airstrip	VEPN	—	Government of Odisha	Public	Non-operational
Rairangpur	Rairangpur Airstrip	—	—	Government of Odisha	Public	Non-operational
Rayagada	Gunupur Airstrip	—	—	Government of Odisha	Public	Non-operational
Rayagada	Therubali Airstrip	—	—	Indian Metals and Ferro Alloys	Private	Private
Rourkela	Rourkela Airport	VERK	RRK	Airports Authority of India	Domestic	Commercial
Sambalpur	Hirakud Airstrip	VEHK	—	Government of Odisha	Public	Non-operational
**Proposed**
Puri	Puri International Airport	—	—	Government of Odisha	International	Future
