= IndiaOne Air =

Regional airline of India

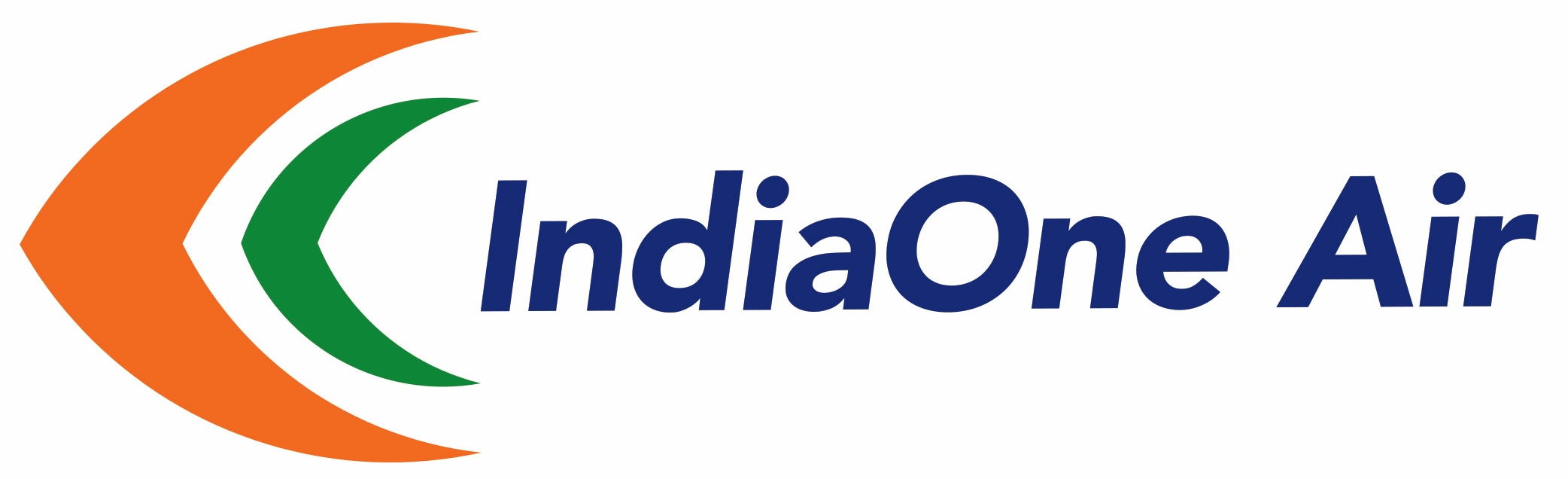

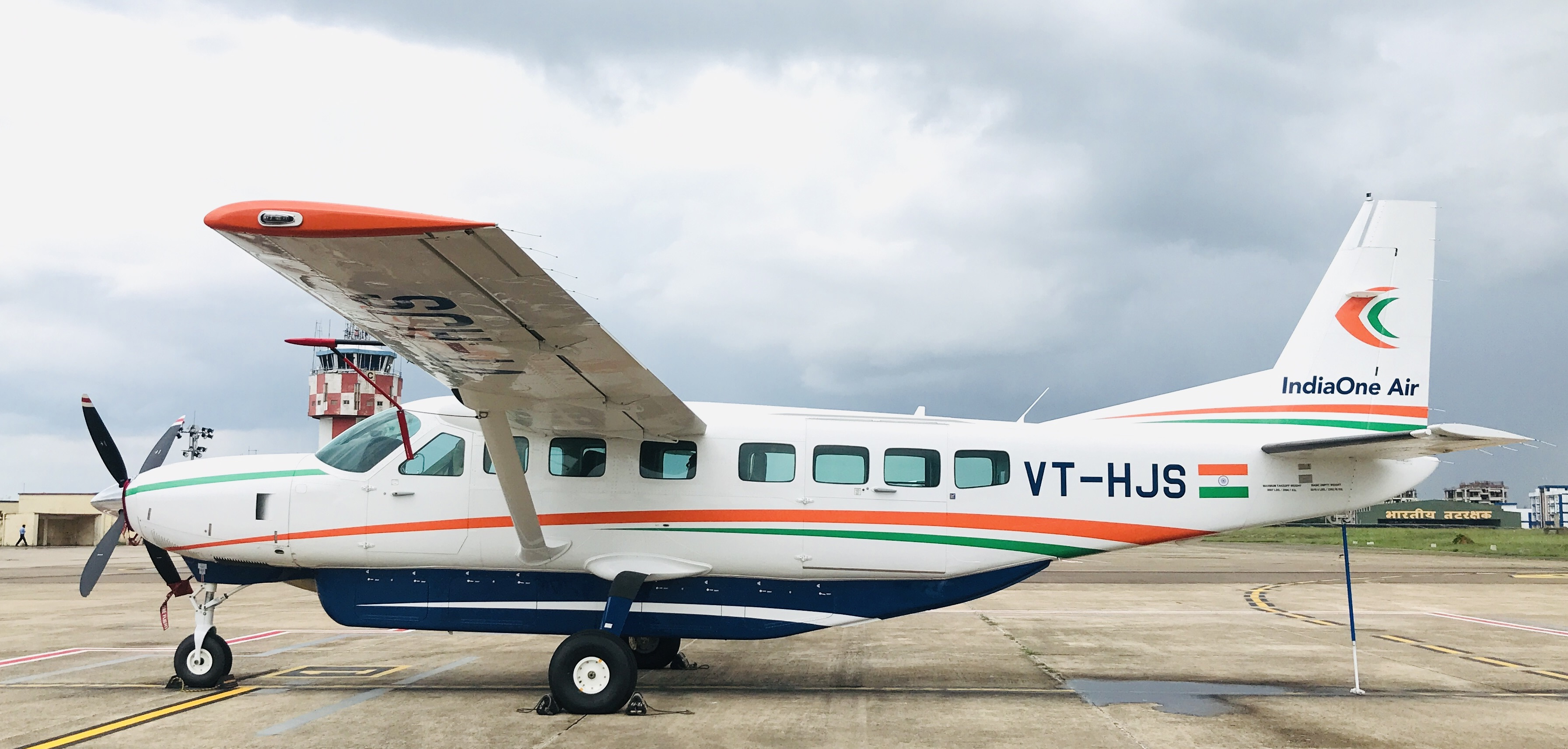
- Cessna 208 Caravan of IndiaOne Air
IATA	ICAO	Call sign
I7	IOA	INDIA FIRST
- Founded: 2020; 6 years ago
- Commenced operations: 3 August 2022; 4 years ago
- Hubs: Biju Patnaik Airport (Bhubaneshwar)
- Fleet size: 3
- Destinations: 5
- Parent company: GSEC Monarch and Deccan Aviation
- Headquarters: Ahmedabad, Gujarat, India
- Key people: Prem Kumar Garg (CEO)
- Website: https://www.indiaoneair.com/

IndiaOne Air is an Indian regional airline headquartered in Ahmedabad, Gujarat. The airline operates scheduled domestic flights using a fleet of Cessna 208 Caravan aircraft with its main hub at the Biju Patnaik Airport in Bhubaneswar, Odisha.

== History ==
IndiaOne Air was established in 2020. The airline completed its proving flight on 22 June 2022, after which it received its Air Operator Certificate (AOC) on 24 June 2022 from the Directorate General of Civil Aviation. It commenced commercial scheduled operations soon after, with its inaugural flight from Bhubaneswar to Jeypore in Odisha as a part of the Government of India’s UDAN Regional Connectivity Scheme.

== Corporate affairs ==
The airline is headquartered in Ahmedabad, Gujarat. Prem Kumar Garg serves as the Chief Executive Officer of the airline.

== Destinations ==
As of January 2026, IndiaOne Air flies to eight destinations in Eastern India from its hub at Biju Patnaik Airport in Bhubaneswar.

Country (State)	City	Airport	Notes
India (Andhra Pradesh)	Visakhapatnam	Alluri Sitarama Raju International Airport	
India (Chhattisgarh)	Raipur	Swami Vivekananda Airport	Terminated
India (Jharkhand)	Jamshedpur	Sonari Airport	Terminated
India (Odisha)	Bhawanipatna	Utkela Airport	
India (Odisha)	Bhubaneswar	Biju Patnaik Airport	Hub
India (Odisha)	Jeypore	Jeypore Airport	
India (Odisha)	Malkangiri	Malkangiri Airport	
India (Odisha)	Rourkela	Rourkela Airport	
India (West Bengal)	Cooch Behar	Cooch Behar Airport	Terminated
India (West Bengal)	Kolkata	Netaji Subhas Chandra Bose International Airport	Terminated

== Fleet ==
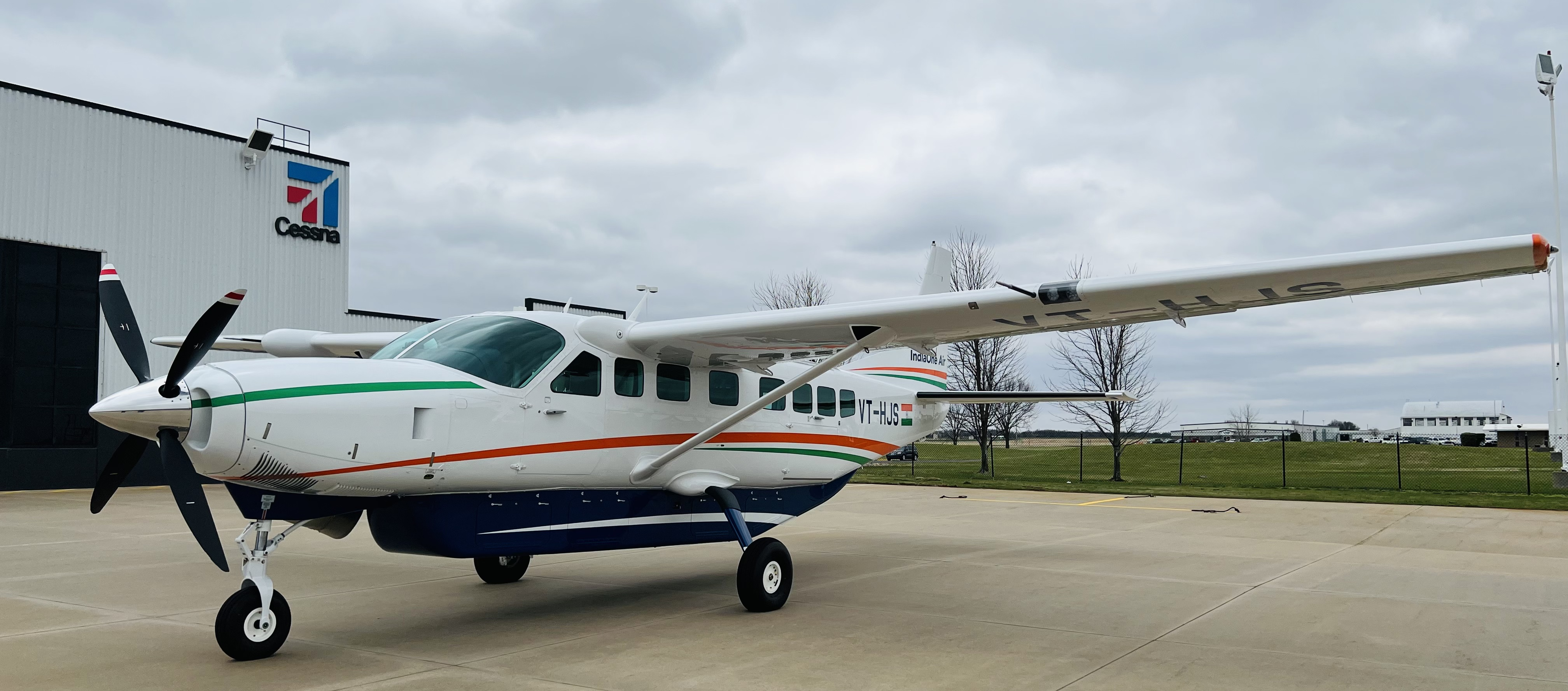
IndiaOne Air's Cessna 208 Caravan

As of January 2026, IndiaOne Air operates a fleet of three Cessna 208 Caravan single-engine utility turbo prop aircraft suitable for short regional sectors. The aircraft has a capacity to carry nine passengers, and ideal for connecting smaller airports with limited infrastructure. The aircraft are equipped with advanced avionics (Garmin G1000 NXi) and is fitted with a cockpit voice and data recorder, usually uncommon for such smaller aircraft. In November 2025, IndiaOne Air signed a letter of intent to acquire up to ten de Havilland Canada DHC-6 Twin Otter aircraft at the 2025 Dubai Airshow. The new aircraft, which are designed for short takeoff and landing operations, will enable the airline to serve remote and hard-to-reach airfields with shorter runway lengths.

== Incidents ==
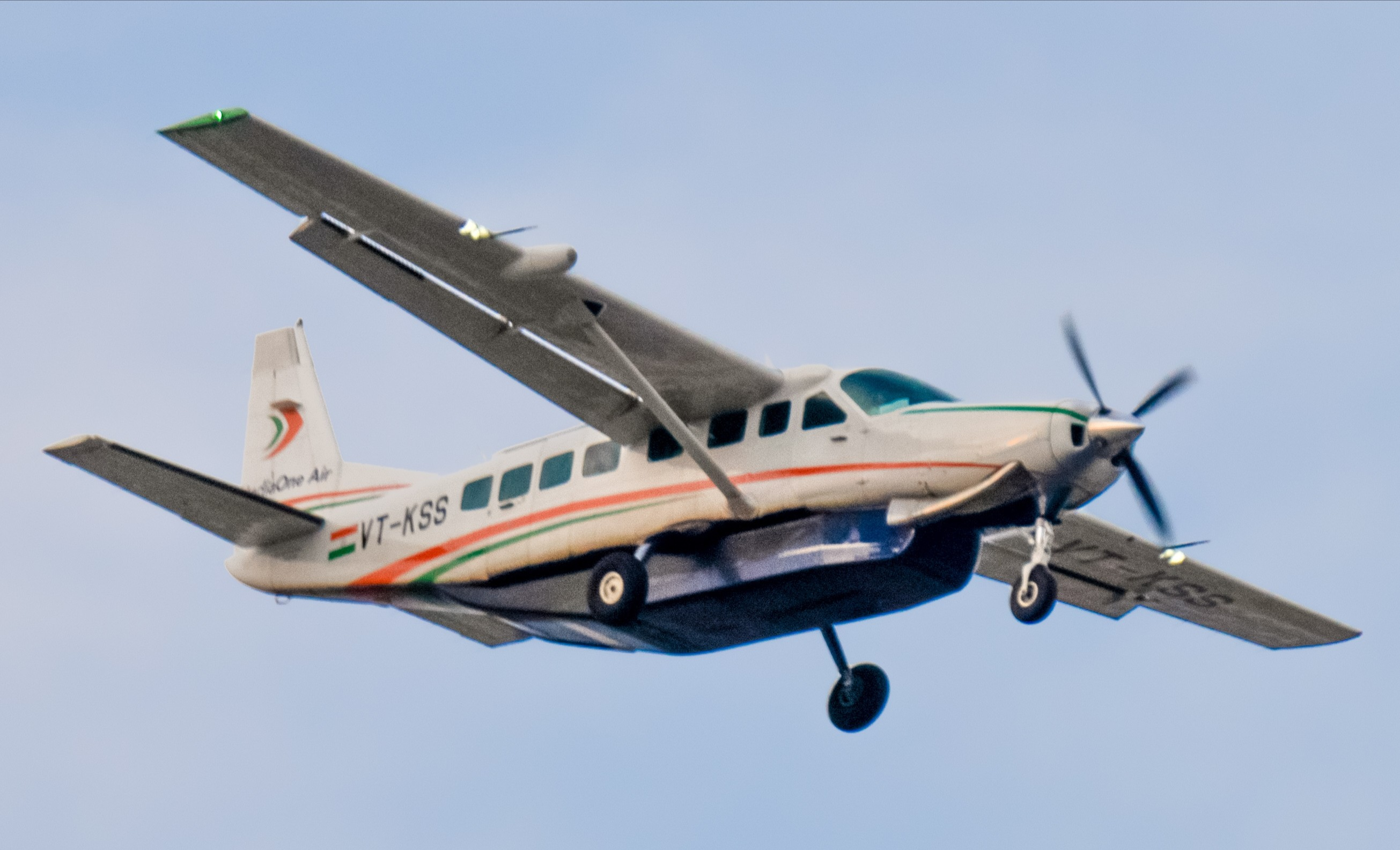
VT-KSS - the aircraft involved in the accident

On 10 January 2026, IndiaOne Air Flight 102, a Cessna 208 registered as VT-KSS flying from Bhubaneswar to Rourkela, crashed in an open-field near Rourkela. The plane, which was carrying six people including two pilots and four passengers, declared a mayday before crashing while attempting a crash landing. All six people on board were rescued and shifted to hospital, with one later dying of their injuries. The incident is currently under investigation by the Aircraft Accident Investigation Bureau.

== See also ==
- List of airlines of India
- UDAN Regional Connectivity Scheme
