= Rairangpur Airstrip =

Airport in Odisha, India

- IATA: none; ICAO: none

Summary
- Airport type: Public
- Owner: Government of Odisha
- Operator: Airport Authority of India
- Serves: Rairangpur
- Location: Rairangpur, Odisha, India
- Elevation AMSL: 853 ft / 260 m
- Coordinates: 22°18′18″N 86°08′07″E

Map
- Location in Odisha Rairangpur Airstrip (India)

Runways
Direction	Length		Surface
Direction	ft	m	Surface
18/36	4,495	1,370	Asphalt

Rairangpur Airstrip, also known as Dandbose Airstrip, is located 6 km away from Rairangpur city center in Mayurbhanj district, Odisha, India. Rairangpur Airstrip is spread over 61 acres and is under the control of the Works Department of Government of Odisha. The runway is 750 meters (around 3280 ft) long and is periodically maintained by the state government.

Currently, there are no scheduled operations to and from this airstrip. The nearest airport is Sonari Airport in Jamshedpur, Jharkhand, 71 km from Rairangpur Airport. The state capital Bhubaneswar's Biju Patnaik International Airport is nearly 275 km from Rairangpur Airstrip.

The President of India, Smt Droupadi Murmu laid the foundation stones for development of Dandbose Airport under UDAN Scheme at Rairangpur on 7th December 2024.

== See also ==
- List of airports in Odisha
