= Malkangiri Airport =

Airport in Odisha, India

- IATA: none; ICAO: none

Summary
- Airport type: Public
- Owner: Government of Odisha
- Operator: Airports Authority of India
- Serves: Malkangiri
- Location: Nilimari, Malkangiri, Odisha, India
- Opened: 9 January 2024; 2 years ago
- Elevation AMSL: 685 ft (209 m)
- Coordinates: 18°19′25″N 081°55′26″E

Map
- Location in Odisha Malkangiri Airport (India)

Runways
Direction	Length		Surface
Direction	ft	m	Surface
16/34	5,314	1,620	Asphalt

Malkangiri Airport (IATA: none, ICAO: none) is a domestic airport serving the city of Malkangiri in the state of Odisha, India. It is owned by the Government of Odisha, and is operated by the Airports Authority of India (AAI). It is located at Nilimari, 8 km (5.0 mi) south-east from the city centre. The airport has been developed as a regional airport under the government's UDAN Scheme.

== History ==
To facilitate development, connectivity, socio-economic growth and tourism in Odisha, especially in the Malkangiri district, which is considered to be one of the most backward regions of India and that lies in the Red corridor, in 2021, the Government of Odisha and the Ministry of Civil Aviation planned to construct an airport for Malkangiri, under the government's UDAN Scheme, to encourage building more airports across the country and encourage people to travel by air for faster connectivity. Then, land acquisition of 94.5 ha (234 acres) at a cost of ₹29 crore (US$3.0 million) began in the latter half of the same year. The land included 74 acres of the government, 126 acres of private property and 33 acres of forest area. Around 55 families who needed to be shifted were included under the state rural housing scheme. So, houses were constructed for them, where all of them were rehabilitated and given compensation on time. In March 2022, the land acquisition was completed, and the Government of Odisha stated the airport would be completed by 2024, after two years of construction. The tenders for construction were invited by the state cabinet in September 2022, which was won by a Jeypore-based firm, Tarartarini Construction Pvt. Ltd. On 13 October 2022, the foundation stone was laid for the project by the then District Magistrate, Maheshwar Nayak, along with district revenue officials. Construction began on the same day, and was expected to be completed by December 2023, with flights beginning from January 2024. In December 2023, most of the construction work was completed, with the finishing works and testings of systems as the only remaining tasks that were underway. On 7 January 2024, the first trial run was successfully conducted at the airport. The airport was completed and inaugurated by Chief Minister Naveen Patnaik on 9 January 2024. After opening, the airport will be initially connected to Bhubaneswar using a 9-seater Cessna 208B Grand Caravan EX type aircraft, and at a later date to Visakhapatnam.

== Structure ==
The airport has been built at a cost of ₹70 crore (US$7.3 million), and covers an area of around 94.5 ha (234 acres) of land. It has a terminal building, a parking space for vehicles in its premises, an access road linking to the city, an apron for parking of aircraft, a 1,620 m (5,310 ft)-long and 30 m-wide runway suitable for handling ATR-72 type aircraft, an Air Traffic Control (ATC) tower-cum-technical block and a fire station. The airport could be further expanded in the future from a Category 2B airport at present with the available land, to cater more passengers and handle larger aircraft, like the Airbus A320 and Boeing 737. A detailed project report (DPR) for the expansion was prepared and submitted to the government for approval in July 2026.

== Facilities ==
The airport, at its initial phase of development, does not have advanced facilities for passenger and aircraft operations like conventional airports. To compensate, it has the 'landing T' on both sides of the runway, which is a tool that provides information to an aircraft from the ground, indicating the direction in which it should land, and a windsock to give the pilot a quick reference of wind direction and speed. There are all basic facilities for serving passengers in the terminal, similar to regional airports. The airport will develop further in the coming years once it expands from its first phase.

== Airlines and destinations ==
Airlines	Destinations
IndiaOne Air	Bhubaneswar

== See also ==
- List of airports in Odisha
- UDAN Scheme
- Tourism in Odisha
- Red corridor
