= Sukinda Airstrip =

Airport in Odisha, India

- IATA: none; ICAO: none

Summary
- Airport type: Private
- Operator: Tata Steel
- Serves: Jajpur
- Location: Sukinda, Jajpur district, Odisha
- Elevation AMSL: 400 ft / 122 m
- Coordinates: 21°1′54.81″N 85°45′12.80″E

Map
- Location in Odisha Sukinda Airstrip (India)

Runways
Direction	Length		Surface
Direction	ft	m	Surface
06/24	3,000	914	Asphalt

Sukinda Airstrip, is a private airstrip located at Sukinda in the Jajpur district of Odisha. Nearest airport to this airstrip is Savitri Jindal Airport in Angul, Odisha. It is operated by Tata Steel for emergency medical purposes.
