= Gunupur Airstrip =

Airport in Odisha, India

- IATA: none; ICAO: none

Summary
- Airport type: Public
- Owner: Government of Odisha
- Serves: Gunupur
- Location: Rayagada, Odisha
- Elevation AMSL: 403 ft / 123 m
- Coordinates: 19°10′29″N 83°46′30″E

Map
- Location in Odisha Gunupur Airstrip (India)

Runways
Direction	Length		Surface
Direction	ft	m	Surface
13/31	2,460	750

Gunupur Airstrip is a public airstrip owned by Government of Odisha located at Gunupur in the Rayagada district of Odisha. Nearest airport to this airstrip is Jeypore Airport in Jeypore, Odisha.
