= Therubali Airstrip =

Airport in Odisha, India

- IATA: none; ICAO: none

Summary
- Airport type: Private
- Operator: Indian Metals and Ferro Alloys Ltd (IMFA)
- Serves: Rayagada
- Location: Therubali, Odisha (India)
- Elevation AMSL: 859 ft / 262 m
- Coordinates: 19°20′44″N 83°26′04″E

Map
- Location in Odisha Therubali Airstrip (India)

Runways
Direction	Length		Surface
Direction	ft	m	Surface
08/21	3,724	1,135

Therubali Airstrip is a private airport located 3.3 km from Therubali city center in Rayagada district, Odisha.The Airstrip is spread over 30 acres and is under the control of the Indian Metals and Ferro Alloys Ltd (IMFA). The runway is 1,135 meters (around 3,724 ft) long and is periodically maintained by the IMFA.

== See also ==
- List of airports in Odisha
