= Lanjigarh Airstrip =

Airport in Odisha, India

- IATA: none; ICAO: none

Summary
- Airport type: Private
- Owner: Vedanta Resources
- Serves: Lanjigarh
- Location: Lanjigarh, Kalahandi district, Odisha
- Elevation AMSL: 1,370 ft (420 m)
- Coordinates: 19°43′10″N 083°23′37″E

Map
- Location in Odisha Lanjigarh Airstrip (India)

Runways
Direction	Length		Surface
Direction	ft	m	Surface
06/24	5,200	1,600	Asphalt

Lanjigarh Airstrip is a private airstrip in Lanjigarh, Kalahandi district of Odisha, owned by the Vedanta Group. Nearest airport/airstrip to this airstrip is Utkela Airstrip in Kalahandi, Odisha.
