= Berhampur Airport =

Airport in Odisha, India

Rangeilunda Airport
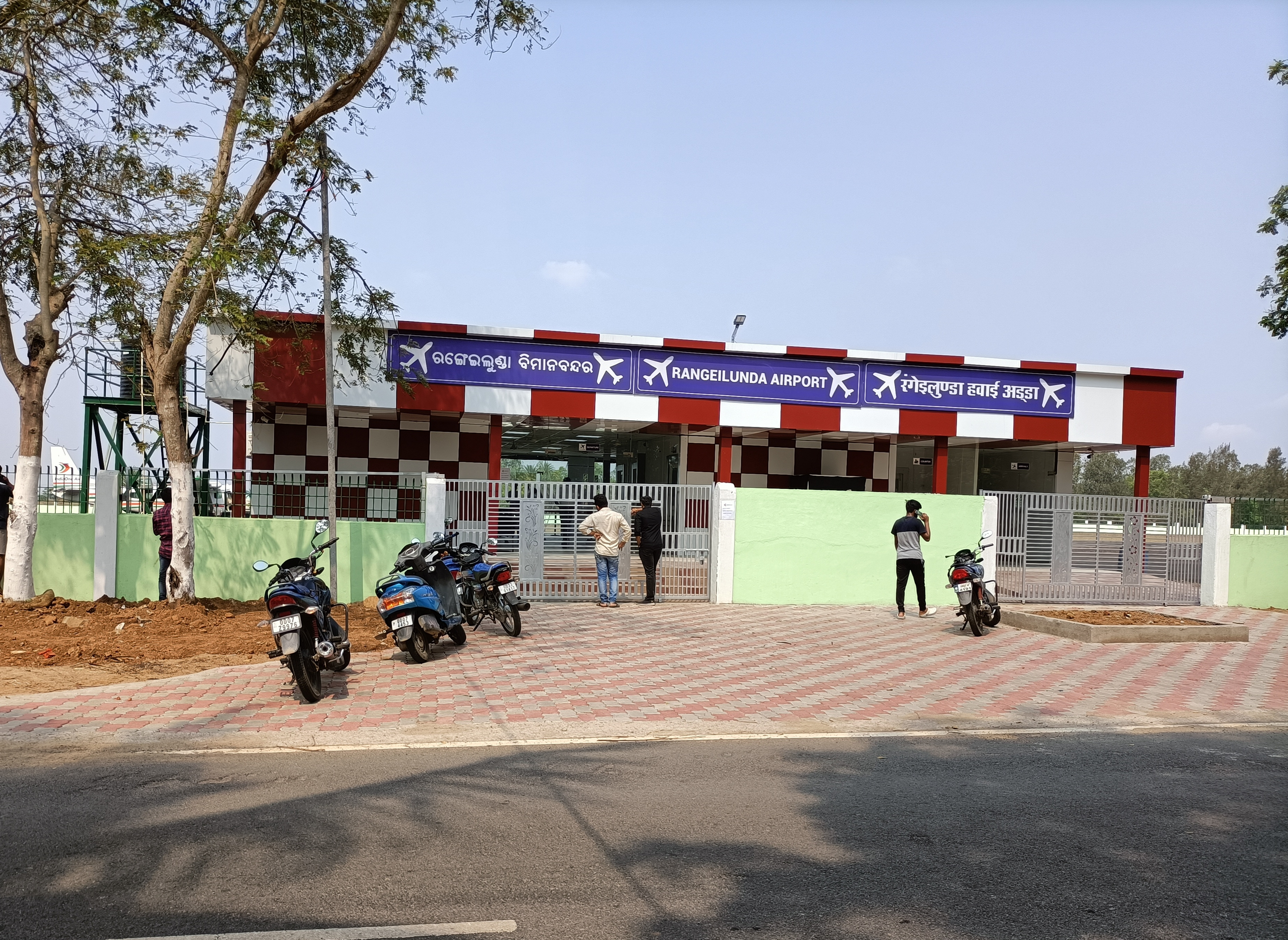
- IATA: none; ICAO: VEBM

Summary
- Airport type: Public
- Owner: Public Works Department of Odisha
- Operator: Airports Authority of India
- Serves: Berhampur
- Location: Rangeilunda, Berhampur, Odisha, India
- Elevation AMSL: 100 ft (30 m)
- Coordinates: 19°17′51″N 084°52′37″E

Map
- Location of airport in Odisha QBM (India)

Runways
Direction	Length		Surface
Direction	ft	m	Surface
18/36	6,890	900	Asphalt

Helipads
Number	Length		Surface
Number	ft	m	Surface
H1	91	28	Asphalt

Rangeilunda Airport (IATA: none, ICAO: VEBM), is a domestic airport serving the city of Berhampur (also known as Brahmapur) in Odisha, India. It is located adjacent to Berhampur University at Rangeilunda, 10 km (6.2 mi) east of the city center and 5 km (3.1 mi) from the famous Gopalpur-on-Sea beach. The airstrip was built in 1936 by the British administration for World War II.

Earlier, before the announcement as Airport on 5 May 2023, the Rangeilunda Airport in Brahmapur was spread over 340 acres and was under the control of the State Public Works Department. The runway was 2,100 meters (6,890ft) long and was periodically maintained by the Government of Odisha. However, now work is going on to make the Airport full-fledged with all facilities like Terminal Building, ATC, sufficient Runway to cater big flights etc. There is also one suitable helipad for facilitating helicopter services.

Earlier, the runway was used only by the defence establishment, State Government, private companies and VIPs to reach Berhampur and other places in South Odisha. Now, the State's second flying training institute is coming up at the airport. The airport was designated to be developed as a regional airport under the government's UDAN scheme in 2018. In view of this, it started commercial operations from 5 March 2023.

== Development ==
The civic authority in consultation with the Town and Country Planning Organisation has developed a Comprehensive Development Plan for the expansion of the city, which also includes a new greenfield airport at a location different from the present airstrip, as the Airports Authority of India (AAI) has expressed concerns over obstacles that would be faced by the authorities in case of expansion. After repeated requests & agitations by civil society organisation; Odisha Development Forum the airport has been designated by the union government to be developed as a regional airport the government's under UDAN scheme in 2018.

The expansion plan includes to develop the airport in three phases, in which the first phase including a passenger terminal for serving commercial traffic has been completed. The runway is capable of handling 9 to 10-seater aircraft like the Cessna 208 Caravan aircraft.

The second phase includes a new Air Traffic Control (ATC) tower and regular scheduled flight operations from Berhampur Airport. The final third phase will involve the expansion of the airport and operating flights with larger aircraft.

At present, the airport has been approved for handling non-scheduled commercial flights by the Government of Odisha, and the new low-cost regional airline, IndiaOne Air, began to operate from the airport to Bhubaneswar two times per week, from 5 March 2023.
