= Rourkela Airport =

Indian airport serving the city of Rourkela, Odisha

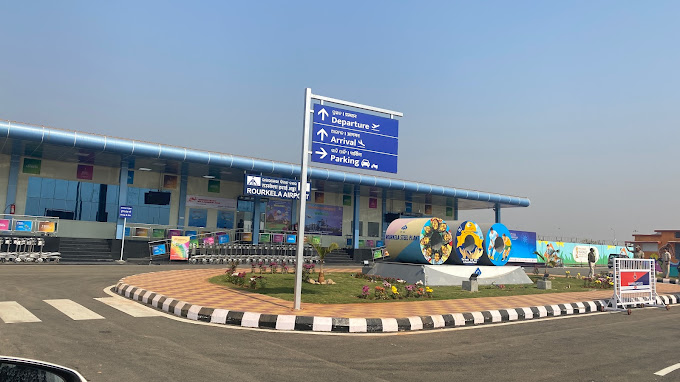
- IATA: RRK; ICAO: VERK

Summary
- Airport type: Public
- Owner: Airports Authority of India
- Serves: Rourkela
- Location: Chhend Colony, Rourkela, Odisha, India
- Opened: 7 January 2023; 3 years ago
- Elevation AMSL: 201 m (659 ft)
- Coordinates: 22°15′23″N 84°48′52″E

Map
- Location of the airport in Odisha RRK (India)

Runways
Direction	Length		Surface
Direction	ft	m	Surface
09/27	6,332	1,930	Asphalt

Statistics (April 2025 – March 2026)
- Passengers: 10,337 (▼ -76.8%)
- Aircraft movements: 438 (▼ -58%)
- Cargo tonnage: —
- Source: AAI

Rourkela Airport (IATA: RRK, ICAO: VERK) is a domestic airport serving Rourkela, Odisha, India. It is located near Chhend Colony, 6 km (3.7 mi) west of the city centre. The airport is capable of handling ATR-72 type aircraft, an apron for parking of two aircraft at a time and a general aviation terminal. The license for commercial usage of the airport was issued in January 2019. The airport upgradation project was taken up by the Airports Authority of India (AAI) at a cost of ₹ 64.24 crore. It involved expansion of the runway from 1,765 m to 1,930 m to handle larger aircraft, like the ATR-72 and De Havilland 8-400 aircraft, construction of a new apron, a parallel taxiway to the runway, a new passenger terminal building and a perimeter wall. The Directorate General of Civil Aviation (DGCA) granted licence to Rourkela Airport for public use on 19 December 2022. The airport was upgraded from 2B to 2C category type. Commercial operations to Rourkela began from 7 January 2023, with direct flights provided by Alliance Air to Bhubaneswar and to Kolkata from 1 September 2023.

== Terminal ==
Inaugurated in January 2023, the passenger terminal is built over an area of 5,785 sq.ft, with modular design for handling 50 arriving and 50 departing passengers at a time, with a scope for future expansion. The interiors of the terminal building depict local handicraft, culture, artwork and tourist destinations of Odisha.

== Airlines and destinations ==
Airlines	Destinations
IndiaOne Air	Bhubaneswar

== See also ==
- List of airports in Odisha
