= Birasal Airstrip =

Airport in Odisha, India

- IATA: none; ICAO: none

Summary
- Airport type: Public
- Owner: Government of Odisha
- Serves: Dhenkanal
- Location: Dhenkanal, Odisha, India
- Elevation AMSL: 403 ft / 123 m
- Coordinates: 20°59′0.65″N 85°40′44.48″E

Map
- Location in Odisha Birasal Airstrip (India)

Runways
Direction	Length		Surface
Direction	ft	m	Surface
09/27	4,511	1,375

Birasal Airstrip, also known as Dhenkanal Airstrip, is located 53 km from the Dhenkanal city center in central Odisha, India. Nearest airport to this airstrip is Biju Patnaik International Airport in the capital city Bhubaneswar i.e. 134 km.

== Gati ==
The Government Aviation Training Institute (GATI) has operated a flying school base from the airstrip since 2019.
