= Puri International Airport =

Future airport to serve Puri, Odisha, India

- IATA: none; ICAO: none

Summary
- Airport type: Public
- Owner: Commerce and Transport Department, Government of Odisha
- Operator: Airport Authority of India
- Serves: Puri
- Location: Sipasarubali and Sandhapur, Puri District, Odisha
- Elevation AMSL: 23 ft (7.0 m)
- Coordinates: 19°47′40″N 085°45′04″E

Map
- Location within Odisha Location within India

Runways
Direction	Length		Surface
Direction	ft	m	Surface
23/05	12,140	3,700	Asphalt (Proposed)

Puri International Airport or Shree Jagannath International Airport is a proposed international airport in the Indian state Odisha, which will primarily serve the Puri region. The airport will be built in public private partnership (PPP) mode near Sipasarubali and Sandhapur areas under Brahmagiri tehsil in Puri district. It will be developed in three phases at an estimated cost of Rs 5,631 crore. A six-lane, high-speed corridor between Biju Patnaik International Airport and proposed greenfield airport will also be built. This will shorten the travel time to 30 minutes. The location of the airport was chosen due to its close proximity to Puri and its famous Jagannath Temple and other tourist attractions. Spread over an area of 1,164 acres, Puri Airport will be operated as the first airport in the Puri city and the second international airport in Odisha. The Fairfax group, Adani Group and GMR Group expressed interest in developing the greenfield airport in April 2024.

== History ==
The need for an airport at Puri arose in 2021, when Chief Minister Naveen Patnaik urged Prime Minister Narendra Modi to set up an international airport. The Government of Odisha's plan to set up the airport was granted site clearance by the Ministry of Civil Aviation (MOCA) in 2023, one year after the Government of Odisha Submitted all requisites to the ministry, as per the Greenfield Airport Policy (GFA), 2008. On 20 November 2023, the Environment Appraisal Committee (Infra 2) of Ministry of Environment, Forest and Climate Change recommends granting Terms of Reference (ToR) for preparation of the Environment Impact Assessment (EIA) Report and Environment Management Plan (EMP) with Public Consultation for development of Greenfield Shree Jagannath International Airport by M/s Commerce and Transport (Transport) Department, Government of Odisha.

On 25 January 2024, Commerce and Transport Department, Government of Odisha applied for Coastal Regulation Zone (CRZ) Approval. The tender for a public-private partnership (PPP) was floated by the Odisha Industrial Infrastructure Development Corporation (IDCO) in February 2024. Odisha Coastal Zone Management Authority (OCZMA) after detailed deliberation and discussion decided to recommend the proposal to Ministry of Environment, Forest and Climate Change, Govt. of India for grant of composite Environment Clearance (EC) & Coastal Regulation Zone (CRZ) Clearance for the Airport on 16 March 2024. The Environment Assessment Committee (EAC), on 26 June 2025, recommended Environmental Clearance to the Project, subject to submission of Stage-I Forest Clearance & Coastal Regulation Zone (CRZ) Clearance by the Project Proponent. In July 2025, The Forest Advisory Committee deferred the project clearance, citing concerns about the proposed airport's likely impact on Olive ridley sea turtle and Irrawaddy dolphins, as well as the impact of felling 13,000 trees on the Puri coastline, which is vulnerable to frequent cyclones.

Forest Advisory Committee (FAC) in Ministry of Environment, Forest & Climate Change of Govt of India grants Forest Clearance to the Project on 27 February 2026.

=== Land purchase ===
In June 2021, the officials of Airports Authority of India inspected the land identified for the Puri International Airport. A draft of Social Impact Assessment (SIA) report on the proposed airport was prepared by the National Institute of Rural Development and Environmental Science under the Nabakrishna Chowdhury Center for Development Studies for acquisition of private land. In May 2023, Puri Sub-Collector Bhavataran Sahu organised the first public hearing at Sipasarubali Mauza to discuss the draft of Social Impact Assessment (SIA) report before the acquisition of private land.

The Puri district administration has started the process for acquisition around 1,164 acres of land including 68 acres of forest and 221.48 acres private land at Sipasarubali and Sandhapur Mauza in 2023. The private land for the project was identified as 153.37 acres at Sipasarubali and 68.11 acres at Sandhapur.
