= Gudari Airstrip =

Airport in Odisha, India

- IATA: none; ICAO: VEPN

Summary
- Airport type: Public
- Owner: Government of Odisha
- Serves: Phulbani
- Location: Phulbani, Kandhamal, Odisha
- Elevation AMSL: 1,736 ft / 530 m
- Coordinates: 20°27′52″N 84°15′55″E

Map
- Location in Odisha VEPN (India)

Runways
Direction	Length		Surface
Direction	ft	m	Surface
11/29	4,593	1,400	Asphalt

Gudari Airstrip, also known as Phulbani Airstrip, (ICAO: VEPN) is a public airstrip owned by Government of Odisha located at Phulbani in the Kandhamal district of Odisha. Nearest airport/airstrip to this airstrip is Nuagaon Airstrip in Balangir, Odisha.
