= Nuapada Airstrip =

Airport in Odisha, India

Nuapada Airport
- IATA: none; ICAO: VENP

Summary
- Airport type: Public
- Owner: Government of Odisha
- Serves: Nuapada
- Location: Nandapur, Nuapada, Odisha
- Elevation AMSL: 1,110 ft / 340 m
- Coordinates: 20°52′08″N 82°31′10″E

Map
- Location in Odisha VENP (India)

Runways
Direction	Length		Surface
Direction	ft	m	Surface
18/36	3,000	1,000	Asphalt

Nuapada Airstrip, also known as Gotma Airstrip, (ICAO: VENP) is a public airstrip located at Nandapur in the Nuapada district of Odisha. Nearest airport to this airstrip is Swami Vivekananda Airport in Raipur, Chhattisgarh.
