= Tusura Airstrip =

Airport in Odisha, India

- IATA: none; ICAO: VETS

Summary
- Airport type: Public/Private
- Owner: Government of Odisha
- Serves: Balangir
- Location: Tusura, Balangir district, Odisha
- Elevation AMSL: 656 ft / 200 m
- Coordinates: 20°30′41″N 83°26′50″E

Map
- Location in Odisha VETS (India)

Runways
Direction	Length		Surface
Direction	ft	m	Surface
06/24	4,235	1,290	Asphalt

Tusura Airstrip, also known as Balangir Airstrip (ICAO: VETS) is a public airstrip located at Tusura in the Balangir district of Odisha. Nearest airport/airstrip to this airstrip is Utkela Airstrip in Bhawanipatna, Odisha. There are plans to upgrade the facility and use it as a second base for flight school by GATI in the state.
