= Jeypore Airport =

Airport in Odisha in India

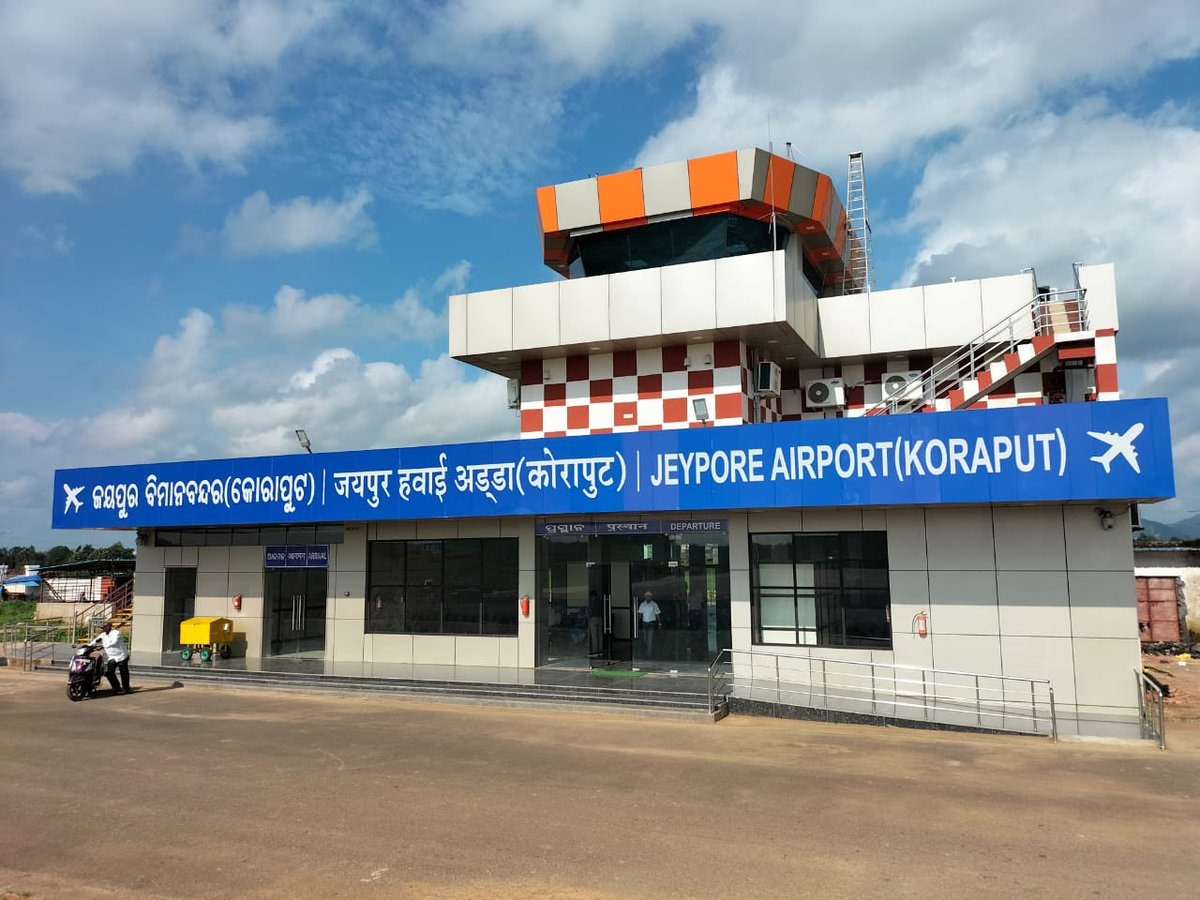
- IATA: PYB; ICAO: VEJP

Summary
- Airport type: Public
- Owner: Public Works Department
- Operator: Airports Authority of India
- Serves: Jeypore, Koraput
- Location: Jeypore, Koraput district, Odisha, India
- Built: 1962; 64 years ago
- Elevation AMSL: 1,952 ft (595 m)
- Coordinates: 18.8802°N 82.5523°E

Map
- Location within Odisha Location within India

Runways
Direction	Length		Surface
Direction	ft	m	Surface
16/34	3,937	1,200	Asphalt

Statistics (April 2025 – March 2026)
- Passengers: 13,819 (▲12.3%)
- Aircraft movements: 1,989 (▲20.1%)
- Cargo tonnage: —
- Source: AAI

Jeypore Airport (IATA: PYB, ICAO: VEJP), also known as Jayapur Airport, is a domestic airport serving the cities of Jeypore and Koraput in Odisha, India. It is located 3 km (1.9 mi) north-west of the city of Jeypore in Koraput district. The airstrip was constructed in 1962 along with the establishment of a Hindustan Aeronautics Limited (HAL) factory nearby at Sunabeda. In the 1980s, Vayudoot operated a daily Bhubaneswar-bound flight via Visakhapatnam. Now, the new low-cost regional airline, IndiaOne Air, operates from the airport to Bhubaneswar and Vishakapatnam.

== Development ==
The airport is spread over 60 acres (24 ha). In 2011, the state public works department (PWD) prepared a proposed investment of around ₹ 6 crore to renovate the airstrip. The masterplan included upgrading the terminal building with modern facilities, widening of the apron, a wider approach road from the national highway and construction of a compound wall. In April 2013, the Government of Odisha began the process of acquiring more land in order to expand the airstrip. The task of expansion was handed over to the Roads and Buildings Department. The runway was widened from 15 to 24 metres (49 to 79 ft) and a 2.5-kilometre (1.6 mi) boundary wall was built. ₹ 55 crore was sanctioned for this project.

In October 2019, the State Government approached the Airports Authority of India (AAI) to prepare a Detailed Project Report (DPR) to upgrade the airport by extending the runway up to 1,200 m.

On 20 October 2022, the Directorate General of Civil Aviation (DGCA) granted Jeypore Airport the license to carry out commercial flight operations under the regional connectivity scheme.

On 31 October 2022, the regional airline carrier, IndiaOne Air, began direct flight services from the airport to Bhubaneswar.

== Airlines and destinations ==
Airlines	Destinations
IndiaOne Air	Bhubaneswar, Visakhapatnam

== See also ==
- List of airports in Odisha
