= Savitri Jindal Airport =

Airport in Odisha, India

- IATA: none; ICAO: VEAL

Summary
- Airport type: Private
- Owner: Jindal Steel and Power
- Serves: Angul
- Location: Angul, Angul district, Odisha
- Elevation AMSL: 624 ft / 190 m
- Coordinates: 20°54′38″N 085°02′07″E

Map
- Location in Odisha VEAL (India)

Runways
Direction	Length		Surface
Direction	ft	m	Surface
11/29	5,840	1,780	Asphalt

Angul Airport, also called Savitri Jindal Airport (ICAO: VEAL) is a private airport owned by Jindal Steel and Power under DGCA license and located at Angul in the Angul district of Odisha, India. The airport is named after the Jindal group businesswoman and the richest woman in India, Savitri Jindal. The nearest airfield is Phulbani Airstrip in Phulbani, Odisha.
