= Sukinda =

- Town
- Location in Odisha, India Sukinda (India)
- Coordinates: 20°58′0″N 85°55′0″E
- Country: India
- State: Odisha
- District: Jajpur
- Elevation: 72 m (236 ft)

Languages
  - Official: Odia
  - Major local language: Ho
- Time zone: UTC+5:30 (IST)
- Website: odisha.gov.in

Sukinda is a town in Jajpur district, Odisha, India. Odisha accounts for about 98% of the total proved chromite (chromium ore) reserves of the country, of which about 97% occur in the Sukinda Valley. In September 2007, the Blacksmith Institute listed Sukinda as one of the 10 most polluted places in the world. Multiple local political figures and scientists disputed the listing, claiming that the Blacksmith Institute used outdated research.

== Location ==
National Highway 200 passes through Sukinda. Sukinda is flanked by the Mahagiri range and the Daitari range, Sukinda Valley spreads over an area of 50 km^{2} from Kansa to Maruabil in Jajpur District. In the middle of this valley flows a natural stream, Damsala, and it joins river Brahmani at a point further from the valley.

== Natural Resources ==
Sukinda has an abundance of chromite, around 97% of India's total deposits.

The valley is abundant in the deposits of chromite and has the largest open cast chromite ore mines in the world. Around 12 mines operate in the area without proper environmental controls, and pollution caused by the mines is a major health hazard. 60% of the drinking water contains hexavalent chromium at levels more than double international standards and as per an Indian health group estimations 84.75% of deaths in the mining areas — where regulations are non-existent — are due to chromite-related diseases. There has been virtually no attempt to clean up the contamination. Sukinda is also on the list of the most polluted cities in the world.

== Tourist Places ==
Near to Sukinda, there are tourist places which are connected by road ways:

- Bramhani River bridge
- Lord Jagannath Temple in Hatibari village
- Chandaneswar Mahadev Temple in Kaitha village
- Sunrise and sunset view points from Kaitha village
- Maa Mangala Temple in Kaitha village

Additionally, there are:

- Mountains for trekking purposes: Mahagiri, Tamaka, Basuli, and Sunajhar
- Ashokajhara waterfall inside dense forest and a temple
- Ragada Dam, sitting on foothills of Nagada Hills, providing picturesque views
