= Malkangiri =

- Town
- Location in Odisha Malkangiri (India)
- Coordinates: 18°21′45.634″N 81°53′36.374″E
- Country: India
- State: Odisha
- District: Malkangiri
- Established: c. 17th century
- Founder: Malakimardhan Krishna Dev
- Named for: Malikamardhan

Government
  - Type: Municipality
  - Body: Malkangiri Municipality
  - Collector & District Magistrate: Aasish Ishwar Patil, IAS
  - Superintendent of Police: Nitesh Wadhwani, IPS
  - Member of Legislative Assembly: Aditya Madhi (BJP)

Area
  - Total: 9.62 km^{2} (3.71 sq mi)
- Elevation: 178 m (584 ft)

Population (2011)
  - Total: 31,007
  - Density: 3,220/km^{2} (8,350/sq mi)

Languages
  - Official: Odia, English
- Time zone: UTC+5:30 (IST)
- PIN: 7640XX
- Vehicle registration: OD-30
- Website: www.malkangiri.nic.in

Malkangiri, historically known as Malikamardhangiri, is a town and municipality in Malkangiri district in the Indian state of Odisha. It is the headquarter of the Malkangiri district. Malkangiri has been the new home of the East Bengali refugees from erstwhile East Pakistan (present day Bangladesh), who have been rehabilitated since 1965 under the Dandakaranya Project. Some Sri Lankan Tamil refugees were also rehabilitated in the town, following the armed struggle of the Liberation Tigers of Tamil Eelam (LTTE) in the early 1990s, although most of them have now returned to their country. Currently, it is one of the most naxalite-affected areas of the state, and is a part of the Red Corridor.

== History ==
Malkangiri, or Malikamardhangiri, as it was historically known, was founded by king Malakimardhan Krishna Dev for his queen. He was the 11th ruler of Jeypore kingdom from 1676 to 1681 CE. He was a valorous military genius who defeated the joint forces of the French and the army of Golconda, and captured fifteen French canons. He killed the general of the Golconda army, Malik Mohammad, and therefore was named Malik-mardhan, meaning 'destroyer of Malik'. He also constructed a strong fort named Malikamardhangadha, and it is surmised that the whole area in which the fort was located came to be known in the course of time as Malikamardhangiri, and later the British renamed it as Malkangiri. When the Orissa Province was formed under British Raj in April 1936, the town was a taluka of the Nowrangpur sub-division of Koraput district of Orissa (now Odisha). In 1962, it was upgraded to a sub-division of Koraput district. The present Malkangiri got its identity as an independent district due to reorganization of districts of Odisha on 1 October 1992, with effect from 2 October 1992. Since 1967, the town along with its district has been one of the worst affected regions due to the Naxalite–Maoist insurgency, although in recent years, the effect has been considerably reduced.

== Geography ==
Malkangiri is located at 18.35°N 81.90°E. It covers an area of about 9.62 km^{2} (3.71 sq mi), and has an average elevation of 170 m (560 ft) above the mean sea level. It lies in the area between the hills of Eastern Ghats on eastern and western sides. During monsoons, the town becomes impassably swampy and heavy floods isolate it from the rest of the state.

== Climate ==
The climate in Malkangiri is generally cold during winters and hot in summers, with temperatures varying from 13 °C (55 °F) to as high as 42 °C (108 °F). The average annual rainfall is about 1700 mm. Relative humidity is generally high, especially in the monsoon and post–monsoon months, due to the interior location of the town amidst the Eastern Ghats.

== Economy ==
Almost the entire population of Malkangiri is engaged in agriculture and primary sector, because it is relatively isolated from the rest of Odisha, as compared to other towns and cities, and developmental stages related to secondary and tertiary sectors are yet to be done. The primary sector accounts for 46.35% of the total workforce. Another important industry on which the population is dependent is tourism, because in and around the town, there are many tourist attractions. Thus, it has a large potential yet to be tapped.

== Demographics ==
As of Census 2011, Malkangiri had a population of 31,007. Males constitute 52% of the population and females 48%. The town has an average literacy rate of 57%, lower than the national average of 59.5%: male literacy is 65%, and female literacy is 48%. In the town, 15% of the population is under 6 years of age.

== Politics ==
After 2019 elections, the current MLA from Malkangiri Assembly (ST) Constituency is Sri Narasingh Madkami of Bharatiya Janata Party (BJP). The previous MLA from Malkangiri Assembly (ST) Constituency was Adiyta Madkami of Bharatiya Janata Party (BJP), who won the seat in 2014. Previous MLAs from this seat were Arabinda Dhali of BJP in 2000 and in 1995, Naka Kanaya for Janata Dal (JD) in 1990 and for Janata Party (JNP) in 1977, Nadiabasi Biswas of Indian National Congress (INC) in 1985 and Naka Laxmaya of INC (I) in 1980. Malkangiri is part of Nabarangpur constituency.

== Tourism ==
There are many tourist attractions in and around Malkangiri, as follows: (Note: In order to give accurate information, the distance data and some other information related to it have been obtained from Google Maps.)

- Satiguda Dam and Eco-tourism Park: It is located 8 km (5.0 mi) east of Malkangiri. The dam provides irrigation facility to the nearby cultivable land throughout the year. The area has been developed as a tourist spot amidst the Eastern Ghats and their thick forests. Boating is also available in the reservoir. There is a cave near to the dam, where there is a linga dedicated to Lord Shiva. The park overlooking the dam has been built recently to promote eco-tourism, where there are also two cottages and a nature camp of the Irrigation Department of the Government of Odisha that provide accommodation to tourists and VIPs. The dam is the most famous picnic spot of Malkangiri.

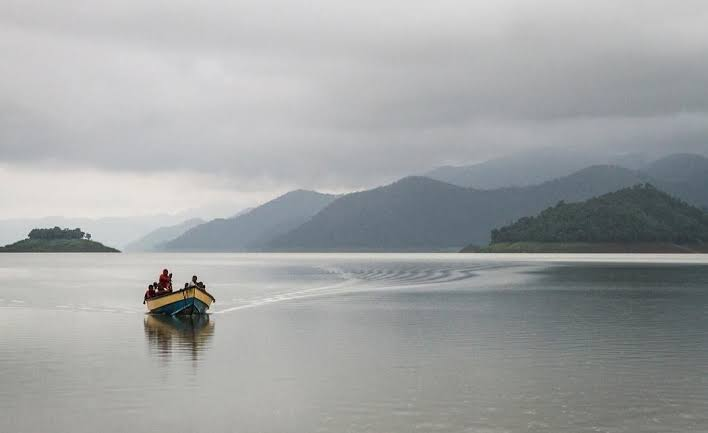
Balimela Dam

- Balimela Dam and Eco-tourism Park: Located 56 km (35 mi) south-east from Malkangiri at Chitrakonda, it is the second-most visited tourist spot in Malkangiri after Satiguda Dam and Eco-tourism Park. The dam is built to generate hydroelectricity, established jointly by the Governments of Odisha and Andhra Pradesh, so to harness the electricity generation and irrigation potentials the Sileru River have. The river is a tributary of the Sabari River, which meets the Godavari River at Andhra Pradesh. Another dam is being constructed at Sileru town, 25 km (16 mi) south-west from the existing dam. The park overlooking the dam, similar to Satiguda, has been built recently to promote eco-tourism, where there are cottages and a nature camp to provide accommodation facilities to tourists, maintained by the Tourism Department of Government of Odisha. The dam and its surrounding landscape becomes more picturesque and attractive during monsoons. For faster connectivity, bus services under Odisha Tourism Development Corporation (OTDC) operate from the dam to Malkangiri regularly.
- Ammakunda: It is located at Khairput, close to the Khairput Forest Range, another reserved forest area, 63 km (39 mi) north-east from Malkangiri. This is a natural, cool place, consisting of a waterfall and a subsequent pool, forming a narrow gorge. The fish species found in the pool are friendly to humans, and are believed to be the form of Lord Vishnu in Matsya avatar. Hence, fishing in the pool is not practiced according to the beliefs of the local people, as well as the visitors. Tourists can enjoy their stay at this place by feeding the fishes. Currently, the place does not have any accommodation facilities, so it should be visited only for a day, that is, from morning till evening. The place can be reached from Malkangiri and Jeypore through National Highway 326 (NH-326). Regular bus services to the place operating under OTDC are available only from Jeypore at present.

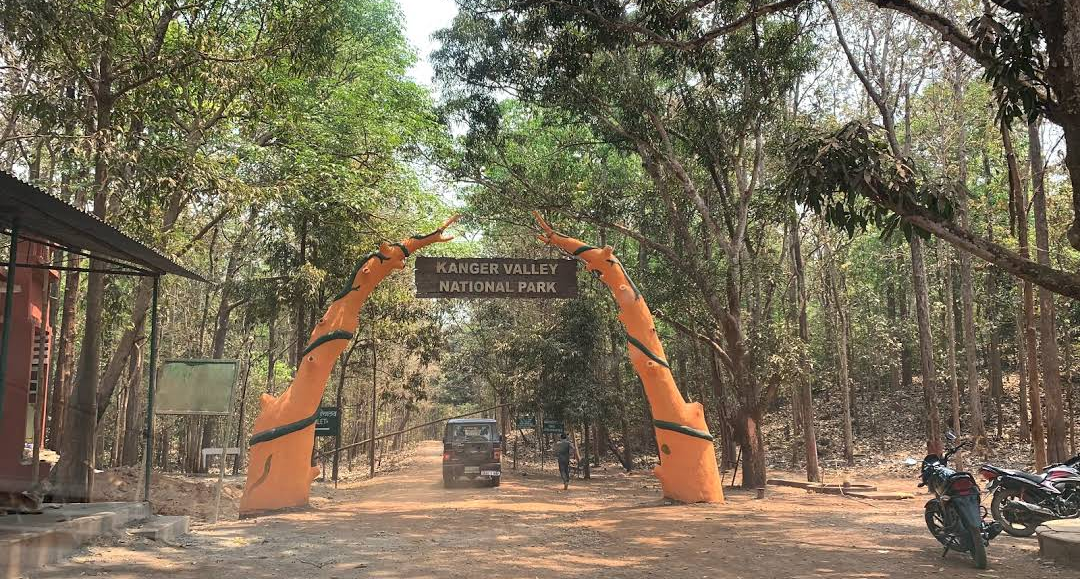
Entrance of Kanger Valley National Park

- Kanger Valley National Park: Also known as Kanger Ghati National Park, it is located 66 km (41 mi) north of Malkangiri and 22 km (14 mi) south of Jagdalpur. It is a national park in the Bastar district of Chhattisgarh. It was established in July 1982, and covers an area of approximately 200 km^{2} (77 sq mi). It is one of the most densest national parks of India, and has extensive natural features, flora and fauna, like the Teerathgarh Falls flowing westwards to the Kolab River, which is the boundary of Odisha and Chhattisgarh states, among other several streams, geomorphologic underground limestone caves like the Kotumsar, Dandak and Kailash caves, and rich biodiversity, which also consists the state bird of Chhattisgarh, the Common hill myna or Bastar hill myna. The park serves its name from the Kanger River, which flows centrally through it. The park is known for its scenery and landscape, especially in monsoons, and is also one of the most preferred tourist spots for nature lovers. There are accommodation facilities around the park towards Jagdalpur side, including several hotels, lodges and resorts. For faster connectivity, bus services under OTDC and private companies regularly operate from Malkangiri to Jagdalpur through the park.
- Jaduguda Eco-tourism Park: Located at Jaduguda, 26 km (16 mi) north of Malkangiri, it is a small park built to promote eco-tourism and make the village of Jaduguda known to tourists and general people, by tapping its potential and developing it as a tourist spot. The park is yet to be developed further to make its prominence grow. To reach, there are buses operating from Malkangiri to Padmagiri, another village close to the park, as Jaduguda does not have any has station at present.
- Malkangiri Forest Range: This is a reserved forest area located 16 km (9.9 mi) east of Malkangiri and only 5 km (3.1 mi) east of Satiguda Dam and Eco-tourism Park, as it is a part of the forest area itself. Endowed with a considerable variety of flora and fauna species, it covers a wide area in the Eastern Ghats, and is another tourist attraction, especially for nature lovers.
- Children's Park: It is located only about 2 km (1.2 mi) from the centre of Malkangiri, lying within the town's premises. It covers an area of 1.55 ha (3.8 acres), and has been built specially for children to play and enjoy, other than as a recreational space for people and a good place for hangouts, physical workouts and holding programmes like parties. It is also a green area with various flora species.
- Bhairavi Temple: It is located about 5 km (3.1 mi) north-east of Malkangiri. It is dedicated to Goddess Bhairavi, one of the ten Mahavidyas of the mother goddess, also believed to be the hill deity since ancient times. The deity has been believed to be worshipped by the King of Malkangiri, whose castle's ruins are still found on the Raja Rani Hill, just in front of the Bhairavi Temple. A Shiva linga is also found in the Goi Hill, also located close to the temple. During Maha Shivaratri, hundreds of pilgrims from various regions in and out of Odisha gather at this hill temple of Lord Shiva. Recently, local people have made efforts in making a safe passage to the hill for the pilgrims. The height of the Shiva linga is more that 6 feet. It has been observed that this Shiva linga is gradually increasing. The Tarini Temple is situated at a distance of only 2 km (1.2 mi) from both the Bhairavi and Shiva temples.
- Mallikeswar Temple: This is another temple after Bhairavi Temple, dedicated to Mallikeswar, a form of Lord Shiva. It is located about 4 km (2.5 mi) north of Malkangiri. The temple is also known for its picturesque scenery, as it is situated atop a hill. The road and the path leading to the temple were redeveloped in 2023, thus allowing better and improved access to the temple for pilgrims and tourists. The temple exists since historical times, maintained by local authorities.

== Transport ==
=== Road ===
The National Highway 326 (NH-326) passes through Malkangiri, which connects it with the rest of Odisha and the neighbouring states of Andhra Pradesh, Chhattisgarh and Telangana.

=== Rail ===
The nearest railway line and station from Malkangiri is Jeypore railway station at Jeypore, located around 110 km (68 mi) north-east from the town. The Bhadrachalam–Malkangiri railway line has been proposed by the Government of India to link the town by rail, and improve connectivity to the remote region of Malkangiri district and other parts of central India.

=== Bus ===
The Malkangiri Bus Station is located at the centre of the town. There are regular buses that commute to and from the town everyday, like inter-state buses under Odisha State Road Transport Corporation (OSRTC), government, private and Odisha Tourism Development Corporation (OTDC) tourist buses, plying to various locations in Odisha and neighbouring states, also to tourist spots around Malkangiri, like Angul, Balangir, Balimela, Bargarh, Bhadrachalam, Bhawanipatna, Bhilai, Bhubaneswar, Brahmapur, Chitrakonda, Cuttack, Dantewada, Durg, Hyderabad, Jagdalpur, Jeypore, Jharsuguda, Keonjhar, Khordha, Nabarangpur, Nayagarh, Puri, Raipur, Raigarh, Rayagada, Rourkela, Sambalpur, Sukma, Sundargarh, Titlagarh, Vijayawada and Visakhapatnam.

=== Air ===
The nearest airport is Malkangiri Airport, located just around 10 km (6.2 mi) south-east from Malkangiri. After two years of construction, it was inaugurated and opened by Chief Minister Naveen Patnaik on 9 January 2024.

== See also ==
- List of districts of Odisha
- Jeypore Estate
- Dandakaranya Project
- Balimela Dam
- Kanger Valley National Park
- Odisha State Road Transport Corporation
- Odisha Tourism Development Corporation
- Eastern Ghats
- Tourism in Odisha
- Red corridor
