= Hirakud Airstrip =

Airport in Odisha, India

Sambalpur Airport
- IATA: none; ICAO: VEHK

Summary
- Airport type: Public
- Owner: Government of Odisha
- Serves: Sambalpur
- Location: Sambalpur, Odisha, India
- Elevation AMSL: 658 ft (201 m)
- Coordinates: 21°34′49″N 84°00′20″E

Map
- Location in Odisha VEHK (India)

Runways
Direction	Length		Surface
Direction	ft	m	Surface
15/33	4,185	1,970

Hirakud Airstrip, also known as Sambalpur Airstrip, (ICAO: VEHK) is a public airstrip owned by Government of Odisha located 12 kilometres north of Sambalpur in western Odisha, India.
