= Raisuan Airstrip =

Airport in Odisha, India

- IATA: none; ICAO: VEKJ

Summary
- Airport type: Public
- Owner: Government of Odisha
- Serves: Kendujhar
- Location: Gopinathpur, Kendujhar district, Odisha
- Elevation AMSL: 1,493 ft / 455 m
- Coordinates: 21°41′49″N 85°34′55″E

Map
- Location in Odisha VEKJ (India)

Runways
| Direction | Length | | Surface |
| Direction | ft | m | Surface |
|---|---|---|---|
| 18/36 | 3,000 | 1,000 | Asphalt |

Raisuan Airstrip, also known as Kendujhar Airstrip (ICAO: VEKJ) is a public airstrip located at Gopinathpur in the Kendujhar district of Odisha. Nearest airport to this airstrip is Barbil Tonto Aerodrome in Barbil, Odisha.
