= Barbil Tonto Airstrip =

Airport in Odisha, India

- IATA: none; ICAO: VEBL

Summary
- Airport type: Public/Private
- Owner: Government of Odisha
- Operator: Jindal Steel and Power
- Serves: Barbil
- Location: Barbil, Kendujhar district, Odisha
- Elevation AMSL: 1,615 ft / 492 m
- Coordinates: 22°03′41″N 85°22′24″E

Map
- Location in Odisha VEBL (India)

Runways
Direction	Length		Surface
Direction	ft	m	Surface
18/36	3,600	1,100	Asphalt

Barbil Tonto Airstrip (ICAO: VEBL) is a public/private airstrip owned by the Government of Odisha and leased to the Jindal Steel and Power located at Barbil in the Kendujhar district of Odisha. The nearest airport/airstrip to this airstrip is Kendujhar Airstrip in Kendujhar, Odisha.
