= Lanjigarh =

Coordinates: 19°43′N 83°23′E

Lanjigarh is a town in Lanjigarh Tehsil in Kalahandi district in Odisha State. Lanjigarh is 58 km away from Bhawanipatna and 430 km from Bhubaneswar. Lanjigarh is an industrial area with the Vedanta's Alumina refinery situated nearby with the Lanjigarh Airstrip.
