= Utkela Airport =

Airport in Odisha, India

- IATA: UKE; ICAO: VEUK

Summary
- Airport type: Public
- Owner: Government of Odisha
- Operator: Airports Authority of India
- Serves: Bhawanipatna
- Location: Utkela, Kalahandi district, Odisha, India
- Opened: 31 August 2023; 3 years ago
- Elevation AMSL: 685 ft (209 m)
- Coordinates: 20°05′52″N 083°11′00″E

Map
- Location in Odisha UKE (India)

Runways
Direction	Length		Surface
Direction	ft	m	Surface
03/21	3,020	920	Asphalt

Statistics (April 2025 - March 2026)
- Passengers: 4,605 (▲60.1%)
- Aircraft movements: 960 (▲79.1%)
- Cargo tonnage: —
- Source: AAI

Utkela Airport (IATA: UKE, ICAO: VEUK) is a domestic airport owned by the Government of Odisha located at Utkela in Kalahandi district, Odisha, India. It is situated 15 km (9.3 mi) north of Bhawanipatna. The airport has been designated to be developed as a regional airport under the government's UDAN Scheme.

== Development ==
To improve development, connectivity and tourism in Odisha, the airport has been selected to develop and make it as a regional airport and eventually as a domestic airport by the Ministry of Civil Aviation as part of the UDAN Scheme. Since decades, the airport used to handle only private and government flights, when in August 2023, the Directorate General of Civil Aviation granted license to the airport necessary for starting commercial flights. The airport has been selected to begin commercial flights to Bhubaneswar and Raipur within the coming months. On 31 August 2023, the regional airline IndiaOne Air began flights to Bhubaneswar.

== Airlines and destinations ==
Airlines	Destinations
IndiaOne Air	Bhubaneswar

== See also ==
- List of airports in Odisha
- Biju Patnaik Airport
