= Jeypore =

- City
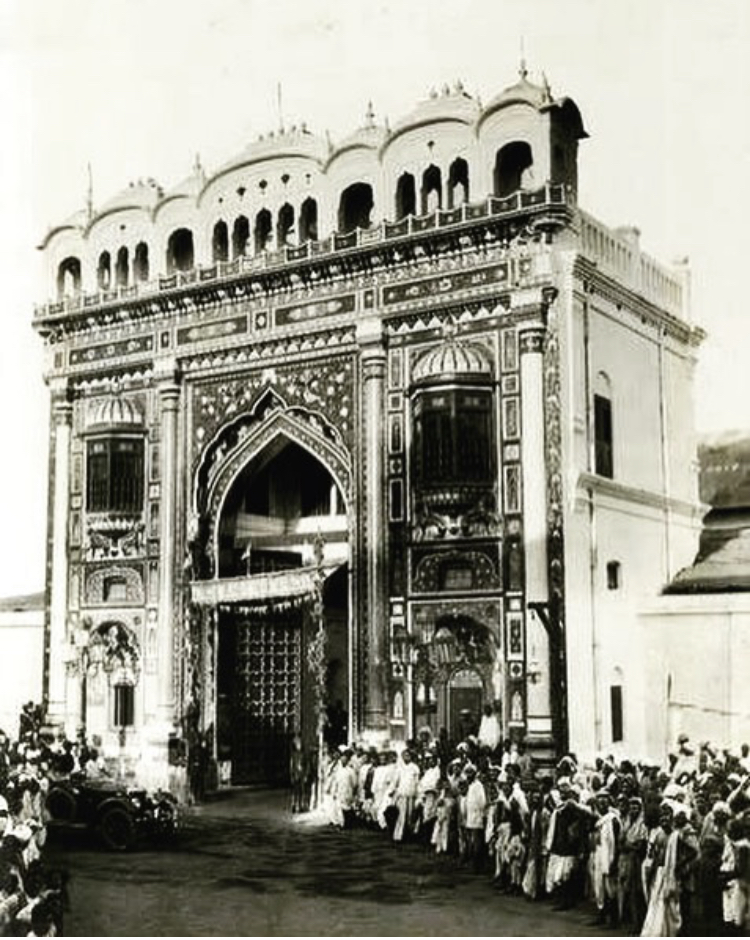
- Former royal palace, Jeypore

- Location in Odisha Jeypore (India)
- Coordinates: 18°51′55″N 82°34′23″E
- Country: India
- State: Odisha
- District: Koraput
- Established: 1648
- Founder: Maharajah Veer Vikram Dev

Government
  - Type: Municipality
  - Body: Jeypore Municipality
  - Member of Legislative Assembly: Tara Prasad Bahinipati (INC)
- Elevation: 659 m (2,162 ft)

Population (2011)
  - Total: 84,830
- Demonym: Jeypuriya

Languages
  - Official: Odia
- Time zone: UTC+5:30 (IST)
- PIN: 764001
- Telephone code: 06854
- Vehicle registration: OD-10

Jayapur (formerly known as Jeypore) is a city in Koraput district in the Indian state of Odisha. It was established by Vir Vikram Dev in the mid 17th century. Dev's kingdom was defeated by the East India Company in 1777 who declared it a Zamindari or Feudatory of the British Crown and much later a Princely state until its dissolution in the Dominion of India in 1947.

== History ==
In 2013, Vishweshvar Chandrachud Dev was crowned as the pretender Maharaja of Jeypore becoming the twenty-seventh king on the 570th anniversary of the dynasty.

== Education ==
There are several Odia medium schools in the town such as Government Boys High School, Girls High School, Municipal High School No. I, II and III (girls), Upper Kolab Project High School, Saraswati Sishu vidya mandir, etc. The English medium schools are Modern English School which was established in 1989, Odisha Adarsha Vidyalaya, Jayantigiri, Jeypore which was established by Govt. of Odisha; Jeypore Public school, Deepti Convent School, DAV Model Senior Secondary School, Redwoods English School and Noval Siddharth English Medium School.

Vikram Dev University, which is one of the oldest and prominent educational institutions in Odisha. The institution was started at the present P. G. Block, back then it was known as 'Jeypore College' from 1 July 1947. As a tribute to the philanthropist king, Rajarshi Vikram Deb Verma, the college was renamed to "Vikram Deb College" in 1961. Honors subjects teaching were imparted from during 1968–73 and Post Graduate courses were started from 1979. The institution was transformed into a university in 2023. The other colleges being Govt. Women's College and Law College. Lately many private colleges have started in the town making the environment highly competitive. Among them, prominent are Narayani Junior College and vidwan institute of basic sciences.

Jeypore also has colleges offering professional courses such as Gopal Krushna College of Engineering & Technology, which was established in the year 1989. Jeypore college of Pharmacy is another renowned pharmacy institute. Along with it various Engineering Diploma colleges are present namely Institute of engineering & Management (I.E.M), Hi-Tech Institute of Information & Technology and Jeypore School of Engineering and Technologies.

Under the British, the Anglican Church Mission Society focused on developing hospitals and schools. At the end of the 19th century, missionary activity was overseen by B. Baring-Gould including the development of the Robert Money School.

== Business and economy ==
Though traditionally an agrarian economy, Jeypore is the business hub for southern Odisha as well as the bordering towns of Andhra Pradesh. There is high potential growth of this town due to high minerals, opportunities, resources around the district adding to all the facilities like rail, air in this town. There are many renowned industries in and around Jeypore. Business units include Sewa Paper Mills, now a part of BILT, and numerous rice and cashew processing units.

== Air transport ==
Jeypore Airport is run and maintained by the Government of Odisha and the Airports Authority of India. Until October 2022, it was a private airport that was under Hindustan Aeronautics Limited (HAL), when it began operating commercial flights operated by the new low-cost regional airline, IndiaOne Air, to Bhubaneswar and Visakhapatnam.

== Politics ==
After independence, in the first general election held in 1952, Late Laichan Nayak was elected as the first MLA of Jeypore and reelected for a subsequent term in 1957. Raghunath Patnaik has been elected for 6 times to the state legislative assembly. Rabi Narayan Nanda has been elected for 3 successive terms starting from the assembly elections in 2000. Tara Prasad Bahinipati is the present MLA.

Jeypore is part of Koraput (Lok Sabha constituency).

== Notable people ==
- Biswanath Rath, Film Director, Screenwriter, Editor and Producer
