= Biju Patnaik Airport =

Airport in Bhubaneswar, Odisha, India

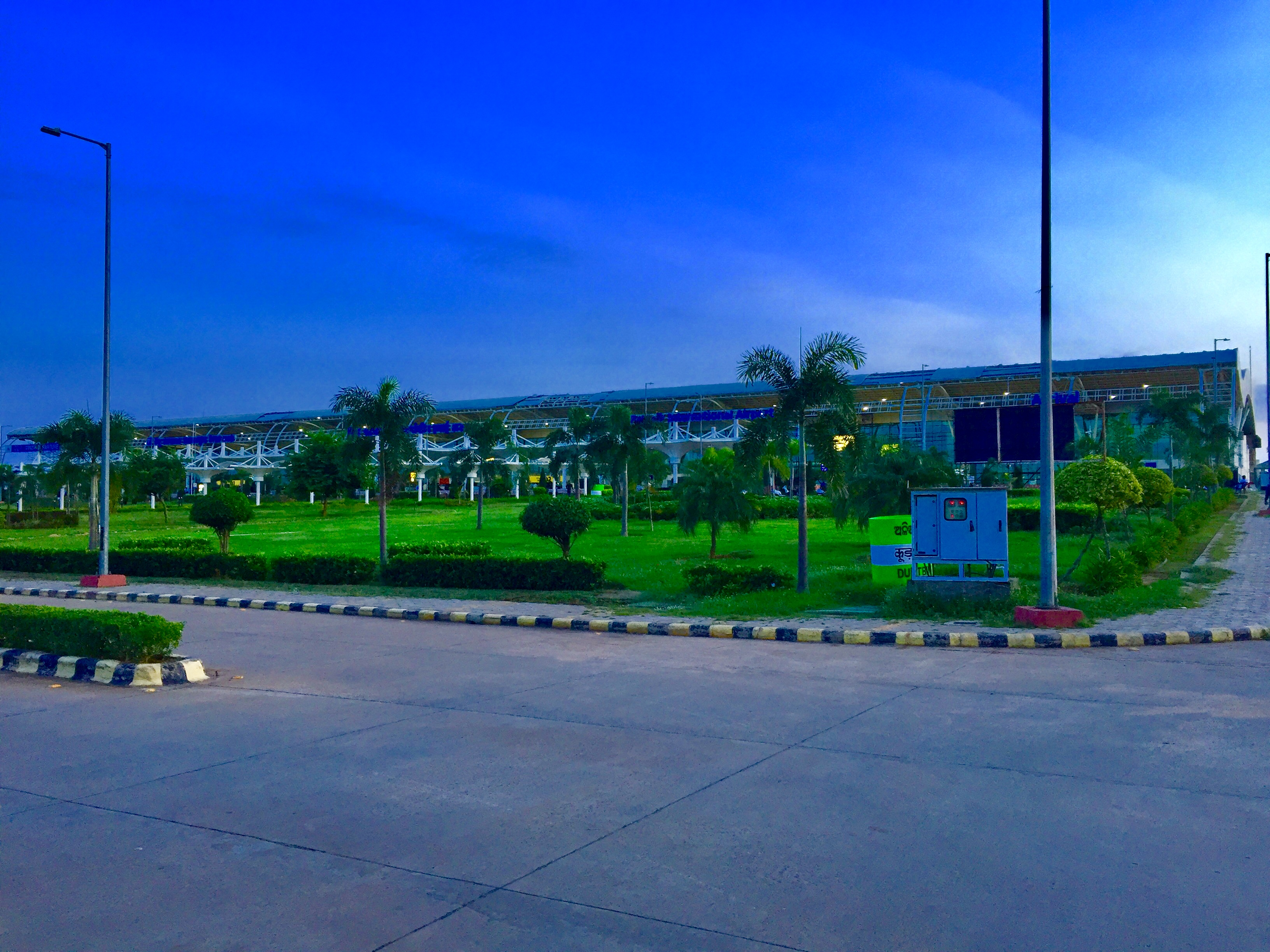

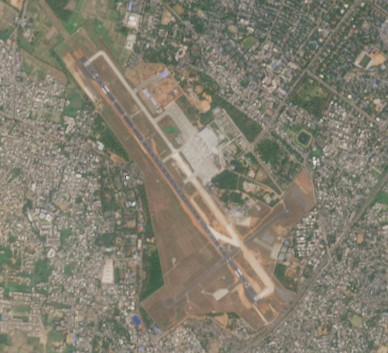
- Satellite image of the airport
- IATA: BBI; ICAO: VEBS; WMO: 42971

Summary
- Airport type: Public
- Owner/Operator: Airports Authority of India
- Serves: Bhubaneswar
- Location: Bhubaneswar, Odisha, India
- Opened: 17 April 1962; 64 years ago
- Hub for: IndiaOne Air, IndiGo
- Operating base for: IndiaOne Air
- Elevation AMSL: 42 m (138 ft)
- Coordinates: 20°14′40″N 085°49′04″E
- Public transit access: Ama Bus
- Website: Bhubaneswar Airport

Maps
- Location of airport in Odisha BBI (India)
- Interactive map of Biju Patnaik Airport

Runways
Direction	Length		Surface
Direction	m	ft	Surface
14/32	2,743	9,000	Asphalt

Statistics (April 2025 – March 2026)
- Passengers: 51,30,834 (▲6.0%)
- Aircraft movements: 39,509 (▲6.2%)
- Cargo tonnage: 9,623.1 (▲5.9%)
- Source: AAI

Biju Patnaik Airport (IATA: BBI, ICAO: VEBS) is an international airport serving Bhubaneswar, the capital city of Odisha, India. It is situated around 4 kilometres (2.5 mi) south-west of Bhubaneswar Railway Station and 6 kilometres (3.7 mi) from the city centre.

Named after Biju Patnaik, the former Chief Minister of Odisha, it is the 15th busiest airport in India and the 11th busiest among the airports maintained by the Airports Authority of India. It is the 19th busiest airport in India in terms of cargo traffic. In the fiscal year 2024–25, it handled over 4.8 million passengers and around 9.1 thousand metric tonnes of cargo.

== History ==
The airport was dedicated to the people of Odisha on 17 April 1962, becoming the first ever commercial airport in the state. The airport boasts two active scheduled passenger terminals, Terminals 1 and 2, for domestic and international passengers respectively.

In March 2013, the former Minister of Civil Aviation, Ajit Singh, inaugurated Terminal 1, which caters to domestic passengers, whereas Terminal 2 was then refurbished to handle international operations. On 30 October 2013, the Government of India accorded international status to the airport after Air India started flights to Kuala Lumpur and Bangkok and AirAsia started flights to Kuala Lumpur. However, these routes were terminated later due to COVID-19. In September 2013, the airport management took a significant step towards sustainability by launching a green energy initiative with the installation of a 100KW rooftop solar power plant.

In June 2022, the addition of eight new apron bays increased the total number of bays to 24, making it the largest apron facility in Eastern India. This upgrade supports remote parking and night operations, and paved the way for Terminal 3 development.

In May 2023, the airport opened a 4MW ground‑mounted solar power plant, making Biju Patnaik International Airport the first fully solar-powered airport in India, operating entirely on renewable energy. International operations resumed from Bhubaneswar in May 2023 after IndiGo started direct flights to Bangkok, Dubai and Singapore.

In February 2024, a new link building was inaugurated to connect Terminal 1 and Terminal 2, allowing international passengers seamless access to passenger boarding bridges in the Terminal 1.

== Terminals ==
Biju Patnaik International Airport is a key civil aviation hub in Eastern India. It houses two active passenger terminals, Terminal 1 and Terminal 2, along with a dedicated International Cargo Terminal to support freight operations.

=== Terminal 1 ===
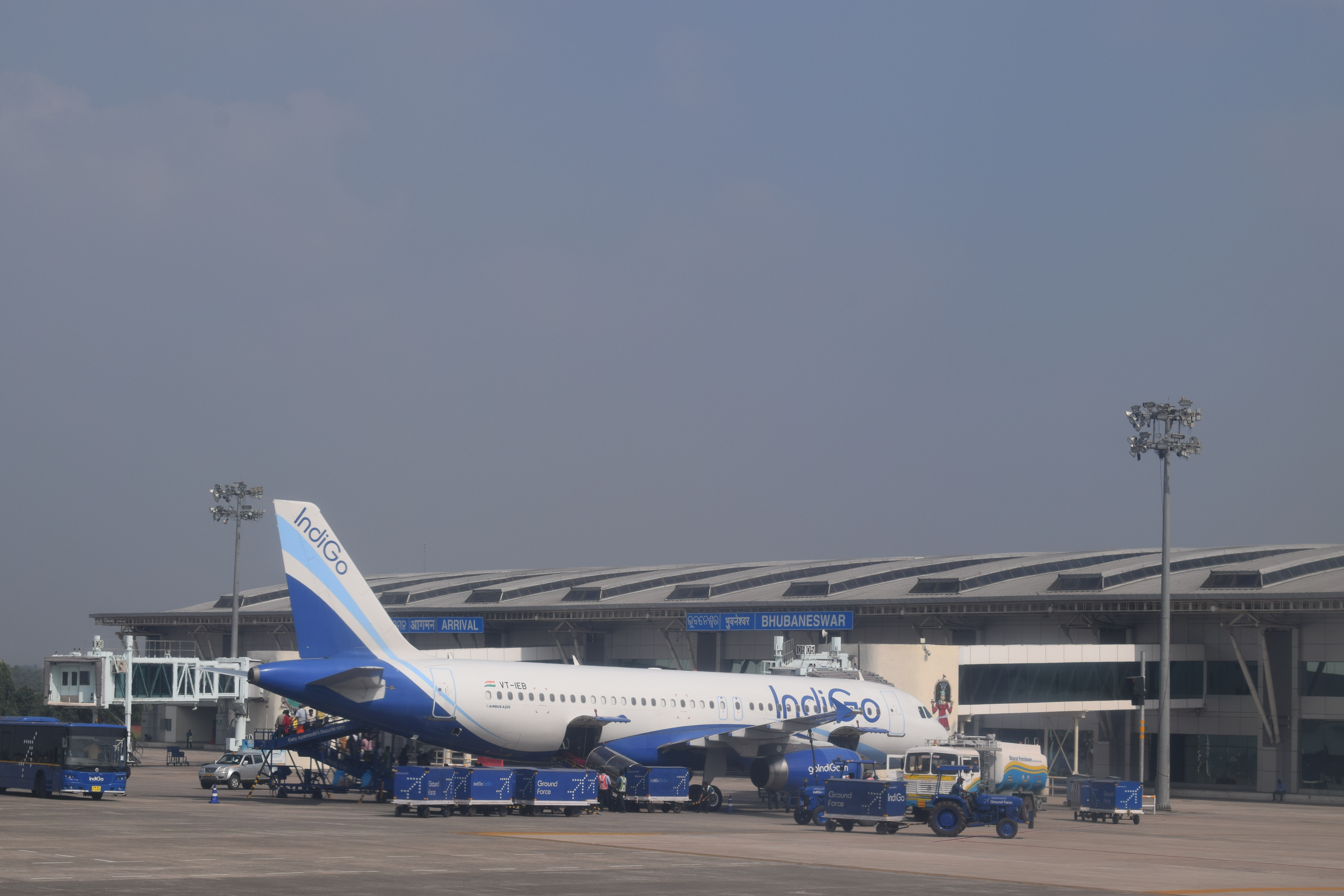
Terminal 1 building as seen from the airside

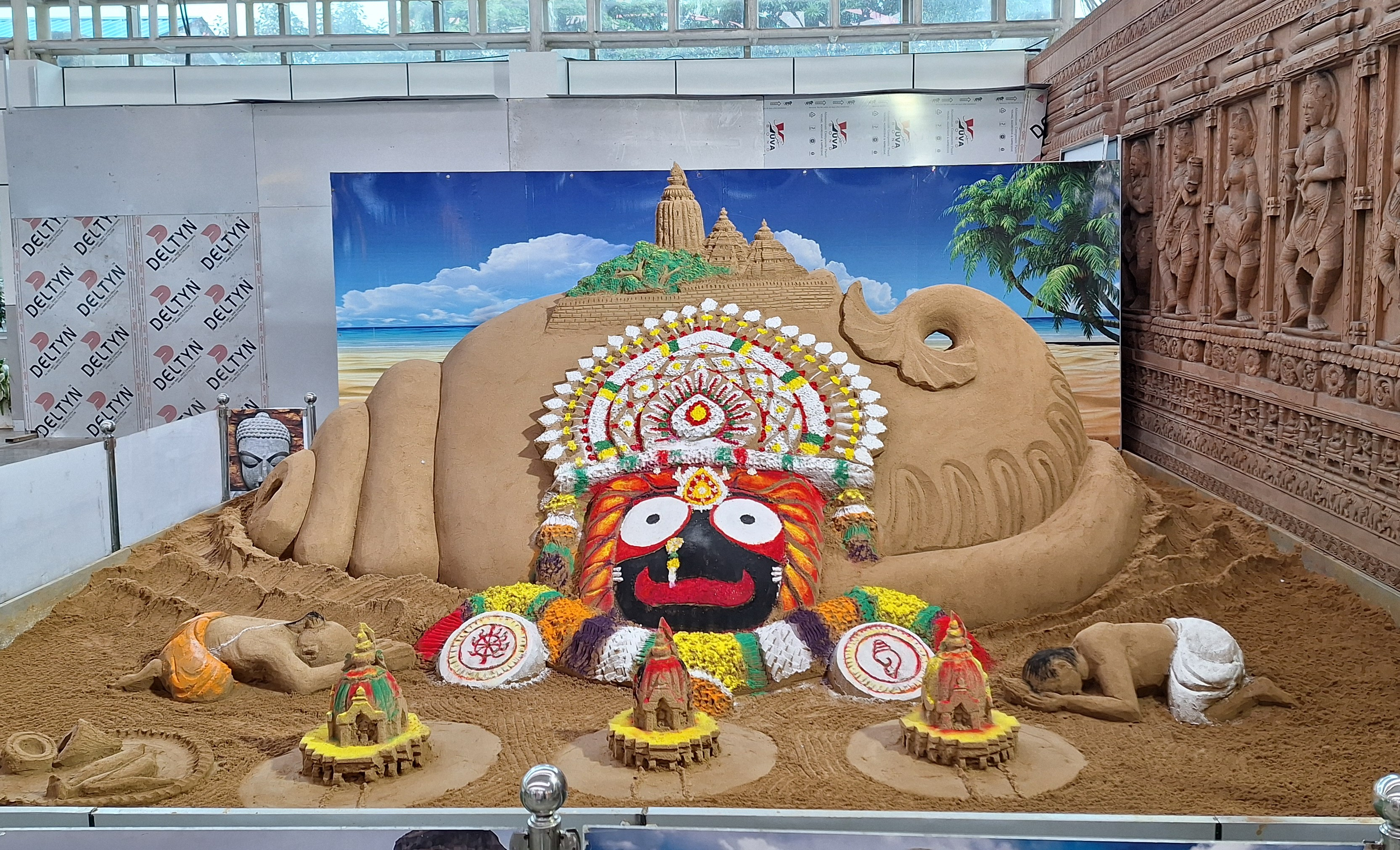
Sand Art of Lord Jagannath by Sudarsan Pattnaik

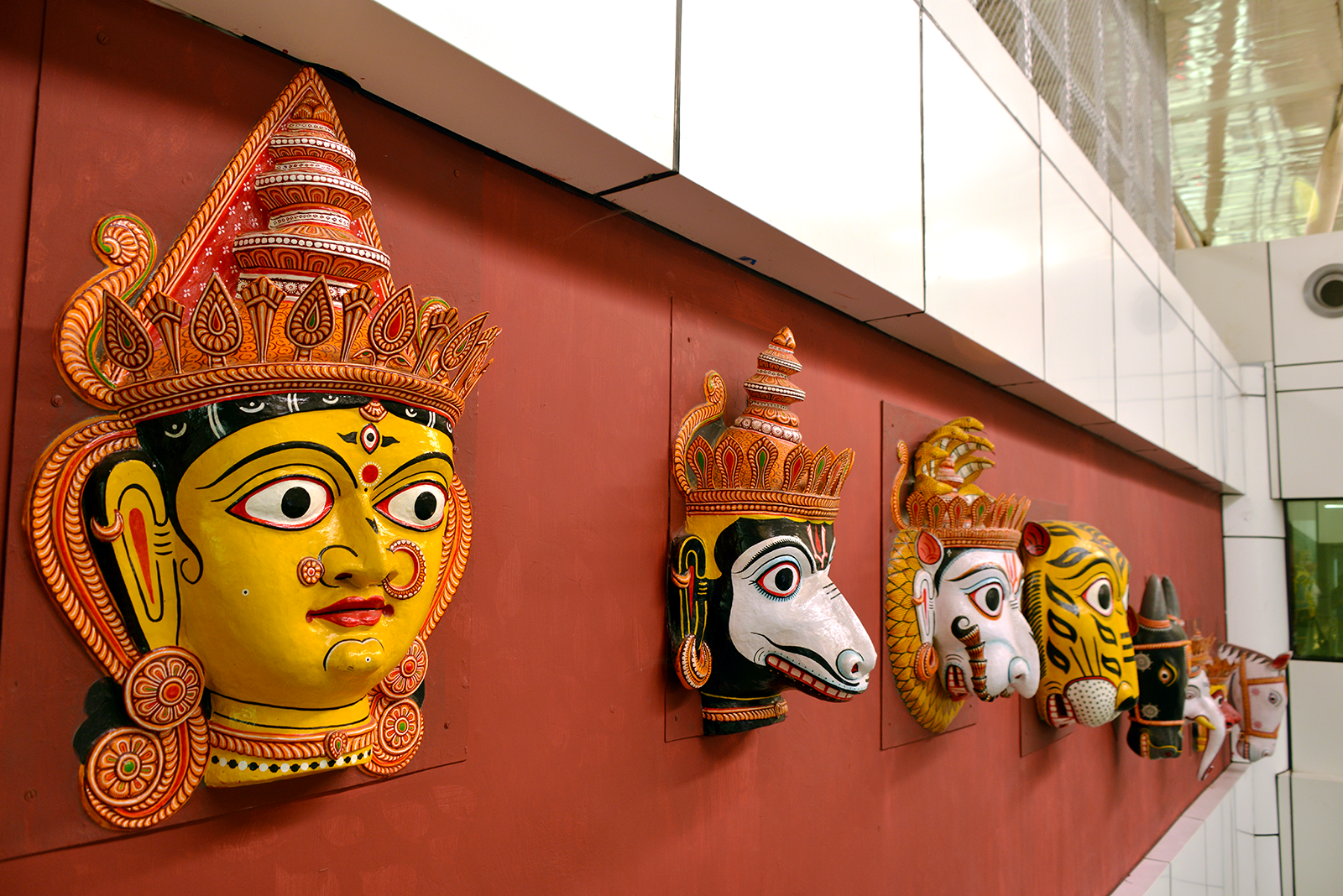
Masks of Raghurajpur on display in Terminal 1

Terminal 1, inaugurated in March 2013, is a modern and efficient domestic gateway, originally built in 2013 with capacity for ~4 million annual passengers to cater the full spectrum of domestic passenger traffic for the state.

Terminal 1, a two-storied building with a total area of 18,240 square metres (196,300 sq ft) constructed at an estimated cost of ₹ 1.45 billion by Lanco Infratech, consists of four aerobridges, four elevators, several escalators, 18 check-in counters, three arrival luggage conveyors, a spa, and multiple lounges.

The terminal building is designed with green building standards, featuring rainwater harvesting, sewage treatment, and Odisha-inspired artwork and décor along internal walls, giving travellers cultural insight into the region. The new terminal also has food kiosks, gift shops, bookstores, art galleries and handloom/handicraft kiosks.

=== Terminal 2 ===
Terminal 2 serves as the dedicated international terminal, playing a key role in the airport's growing international connectivity and passenger capacity. Originally constructed in the mid-1960s to cater to domestic operations, Terminal 2 was refurbished and repurposed after Bhubaneswar was granted international status in October 2013. Since then, it has handled international passenger traffic and become a crucial link between Odisha and major global destinations.

The terminal being built over an area of 6,264 square metres (67,430 sq ft), consists of 6 check-in counters, 10 immigration counters, four customs counters, numerous amenities and multiple seating areas.

A link building measuring 3,360 square metres (36,200 sq ft) connects Terminal 1 (domestic) with Terminal 2 (international). This skybridge was inaugurated in February 2024, significantly improving the movement of passengers and offering a seamless transfer experience between domestic and international flights. Constructed at an approximate cost of 872 million, the terminal also reflects Odisha's architectural identity with subtle design cues and improved passenger handling mechanisms.

=== Terminal 3 ===
Terminal 3 is a planned expansion to accommodate the rapid growth in passenger traffic and improve the airport's operational capacity. As of 2025, the Government of India has approved the development of the third terminal, which is intended to address congestion at the existing facilities and prepare the airport for future demand. The proposal comes amid rising passenger numbers at the airport, with authorities recognising the need for expanded infrastructure.

Terminal 3 will house both arrivals and departures within the same building, improving passenger convenience and operational logistics. The footprint of T3 is designed to be approximately 65,000 square metres (700,000 sq ft), making it a substantial addition to the airport's built environment. With this scale, the new terminal is projected to handle around 8.6 million passengers per year. The development is also planned to include about six additional aerobridges to support aircraft operations and improve boarding efficiency.

In addition to the functional aspects, planners intend for Terminal 3 to reflect Odisha's cultural identity in its architectural and interior design. Officials, including the Union Civil Aviation Minister, have noted that the terminal will highlight the state's heritage, art, history, and legacy, so that visitors arriving in Bhubaneswar can immediately experience a sense of local identity through the terminal's aesthetics and ambience. The estimated cost for constructing the new terminal is around ₹10 billion, and while design approvals and planning are underway, final execution is subject to formal sanctioning The project has been discussed in multiple stakeholder meetings, and land for the terminal has been identified adjacent to the existing Terminal 1.

=== International Cargo Terminal ===
Integrated Cargo Terminal at the Biju Patnaik International Airport serves as a key facility for managing both domestic and international freight movement in Odisha. Managed by AAICLAS (AAI Cargo Logistics and Allied Services Ltd), the terminal has a handling capacity of 26,490 metric tonnes, strengthening Bhubaneswar's position as an emerging air logistics centre in Eastern India.

International cargo operations at Biju Patnaik International Airport originally began in 2017 but were discontinued following the onset of the COVID-19 pandemic. The suspension of direct flights between Bhubaneswar and key international destinations like Kuala Lumpur and Bangkok in 2019 further impacted these services.

Since the relaunch of direct international cargo operations in January 2024, Biju Patnaik International Airport has developed the required infrastructure and regulatory clearances to support import and export activities directly with global destinations. At present, cargo flights connect Bhubaneswar with Dubai, Singapore, and Bangkok, with additional routes in progress. A major milestone was achieved on 15 May 2024, when the airport handled its first international shipment of perishable goods from Bhubaneswar to Dubai.

== Runways ==
The airport features a single primary runway, 14/32, used for all major flight operations. It is supported by two taxiways, one intersecting and one parallel. The intersecting taxiway primarily handles light aircraft movements, while the full-length parallel taxiway and the rapid exit taxiway facilitates efficient operations for narrow-body aircraft.

Runway	Length	Width	Approach Lights/ILS
14/32	2,744 m (9,003 ft)	45 m (148 ft)	CAT-II / BALS

== Coast Guard Air Enclave ==
Indian Coast Guard's Air Enclave along with its 743 Dornier Squadron was commissioned by former Vice-Admiral Anurag G Thapliyal, Director General of the Indian Coast Guard at the Biju Patnaik International Airport on 15 December 2014. The units operate under the operational and administrative control of the Commander of the Coast Guard Region (North East) through the Commander, Coast Guard District No 7 (Odisha). Several strategic air operations are streamlined and synergised for the protection of the sea areas off the Coastal Odisha.

== Airlines and destinations ==
Airlines	Destinations	Refs.
Air India	Delhi, Mumbai–Shivaji	
Air India Express	Bengaluru, Delhi, Mumbai–Shivaji, Port Blair, Pune	
Akasa Air	Bengaluru	
IndiaOne Air	Bhawanipatna, Jamshedpur, Jeypore, Malkangiri, Rourkela	
IndiGo	Ahmedabad, Bangkok–Suvarnabhumi, Bengaluru, Chennai, Delhi, Guwahati, Hyderabad, Kolkata, Mumbai–Shivaji, Patna, Prayagraj, Pune Raipur, Ranchi, Varanasi	
Star Air	Hyderabad, Jharsuguda	

== Statistics ==
In 2023–24, the airport experienced a sustained rise in domestic and international passenger movement. Monthly traffic consistently exceeded four lakh passengers, contributing to a steady upward trajectory in overall annual numbers. In November, the airport crossed the milestone of five million (50 lakh) annual passengers, reflecting a recovery from earlier slowdowns and demonstrating renewed demand for air travel in the region.

== Connectivity ==
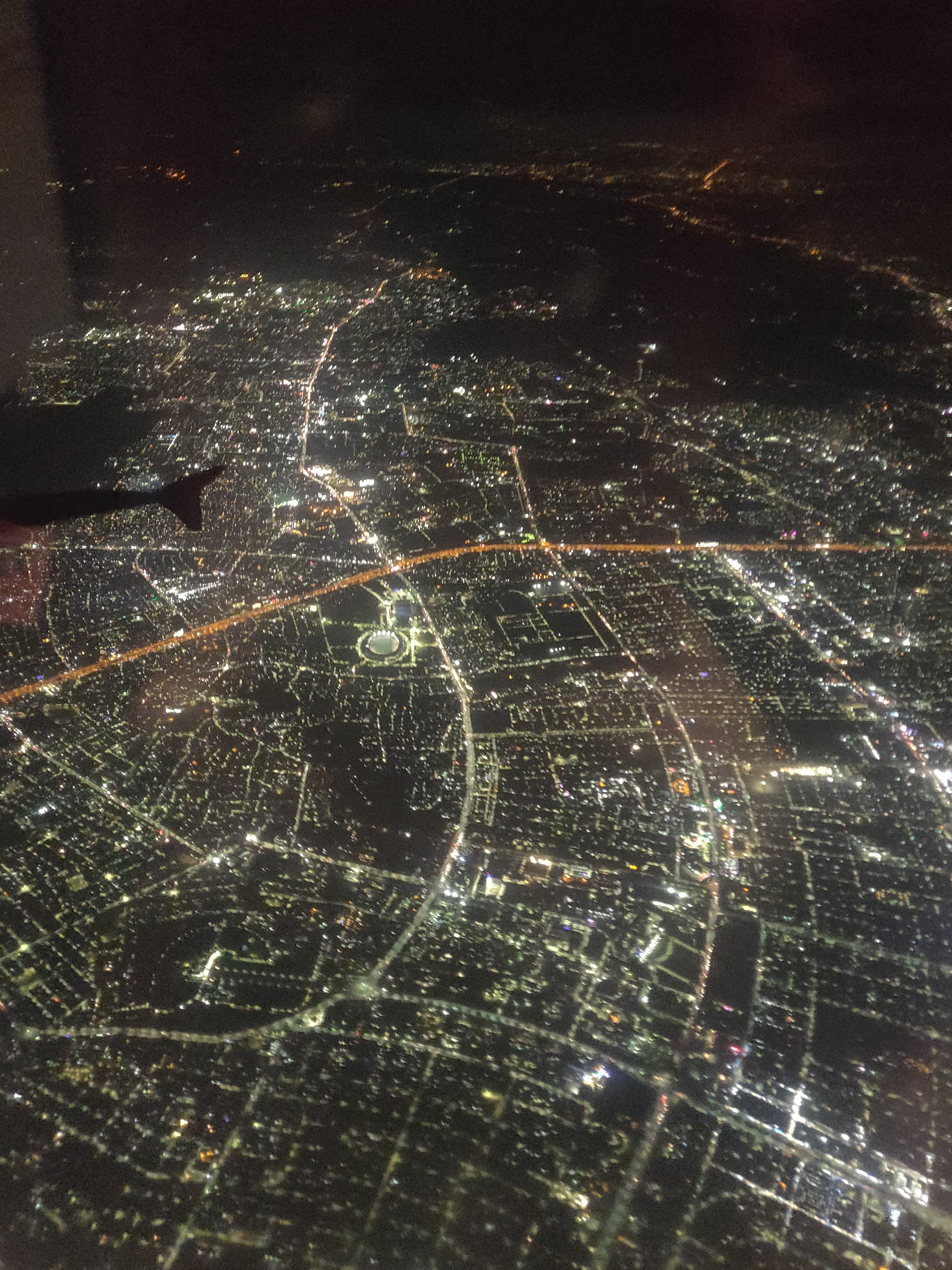
Bhubaneswar city from above

The airport handles both domestic and international operations through its integrated terminal and is managed by the Airports Authority of India. Due to its central location within the city, connectivity to and from the airport is considered one of the strongest among state capitals in Eastern India.

=== Railways ===
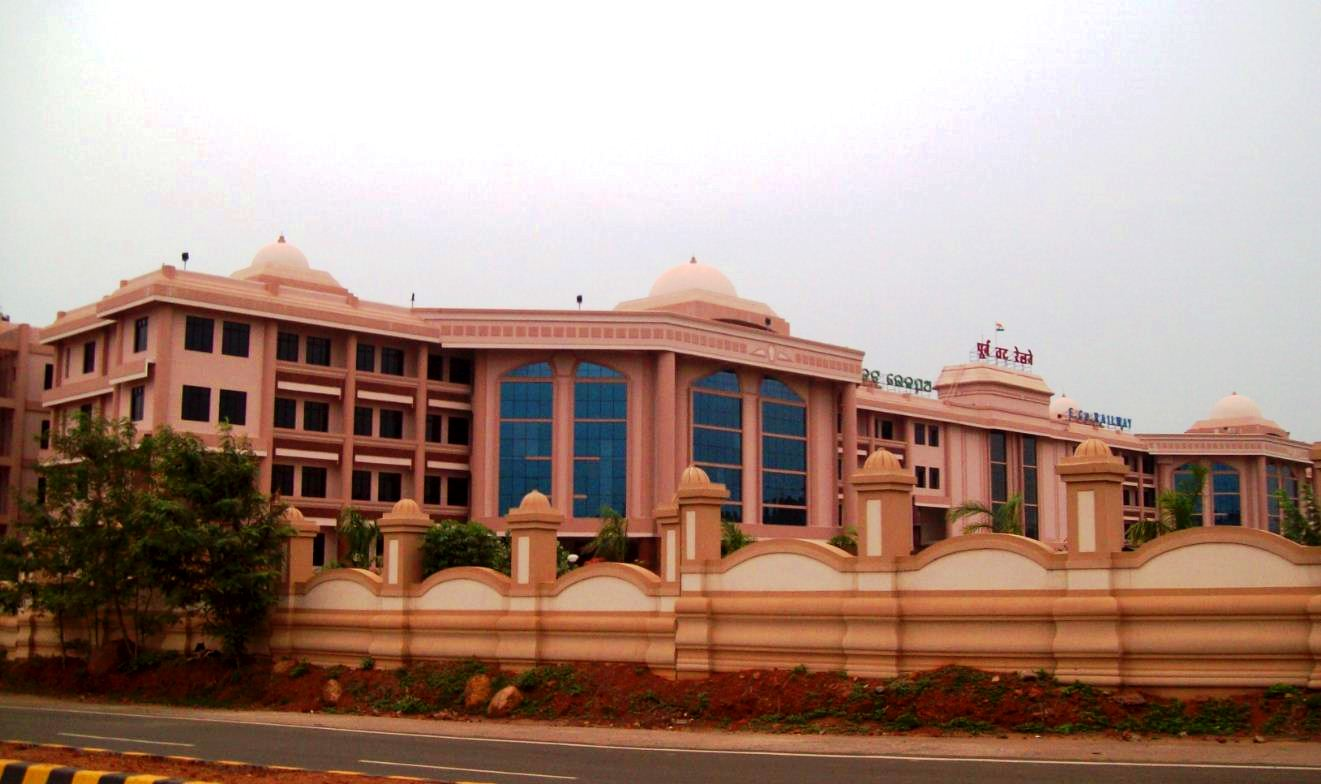
ECoR headquarters at Chandrasekharpur, Bhubaneswar

Rail connectivity to BBI is primarily supported by Bhubaneswar Railway Station, which lies about 3–5 km away and can be reached within 10–15 minutes by road under normal traffic conditions. Bhubaneswar serves as the headquarters of the East Coast Railway zone of the Indian Railways and provides frequent express, superfast, and premium train services connecting the city with majority of the Indian cities. Passengers arriving by train typically use taxis, app-based cabs, Ama Bus services, or auto-rickshaws to reach the airport.

=== Roadways ===
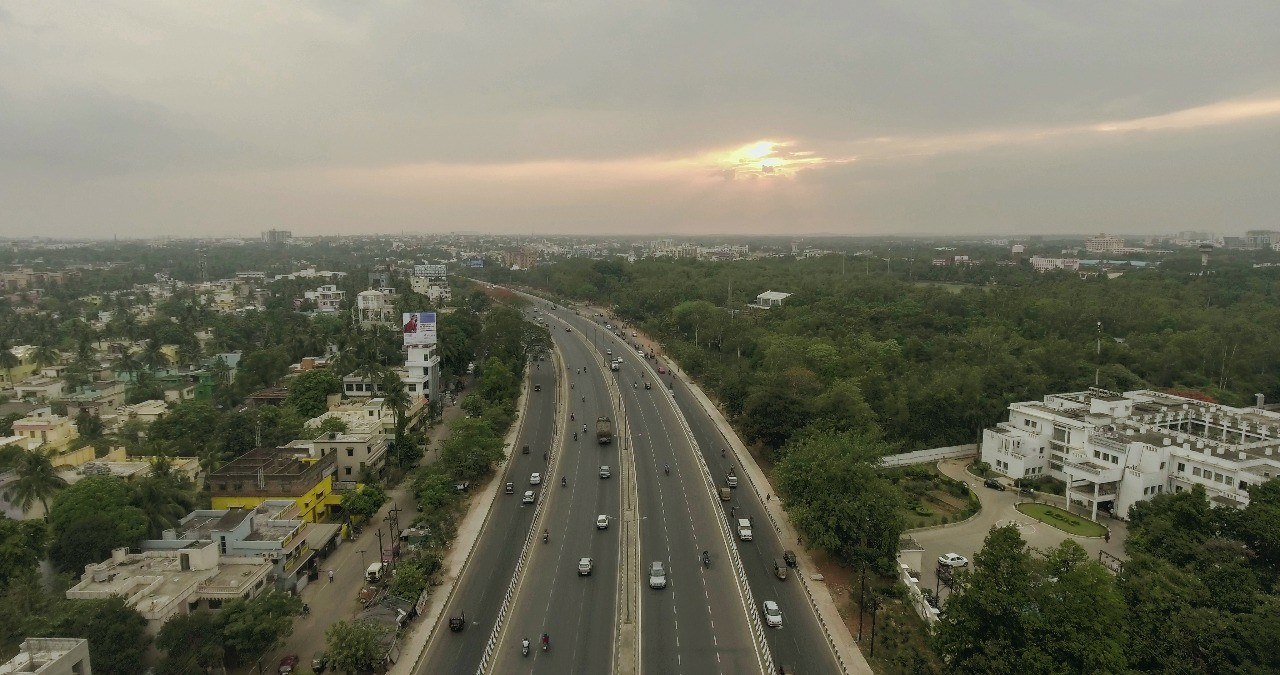
National Highway 16 passing through Bhubaneswar

Road connectivity is the most widely used mode of access to and from BBI due to the airport's proximity to the city core. The airport is directly connected to major arterial roads and benefits from access to National Highway 16, which runs along India's eastern corridor connecting Kolkata and Chennai.

App-based cab services such as Uber and Ola operate extensively from the airport, along with prepaid taxi services available at designated counters inside the terminal. Private vehicles, hotel shuttles, and self-drive cars are also commonly used.

Ongoing and proposed infrastructure projects such as the Capital Region Ring Road development is expected to further ease congestion and improve road access to the airport in the coming years.

=== Buses ===
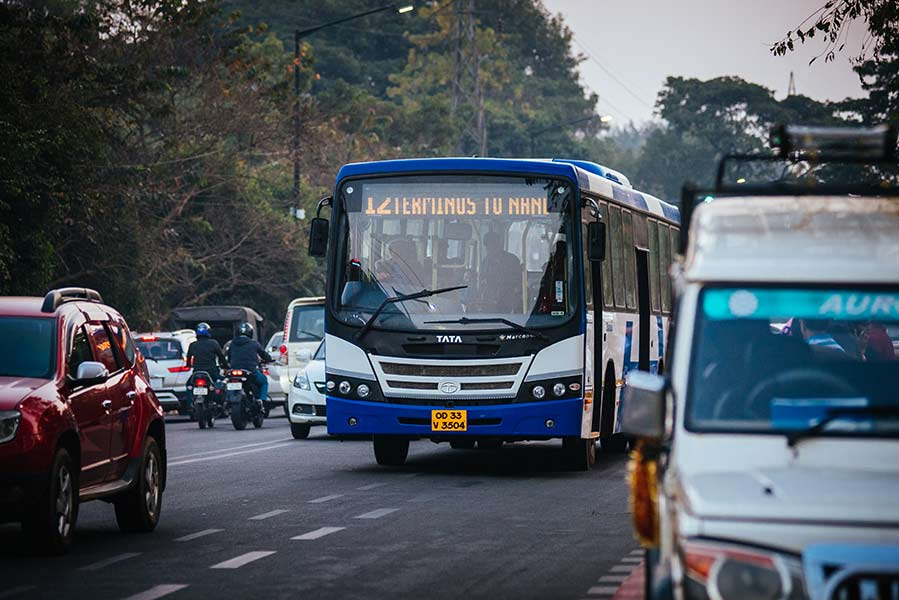
Ama Bus city bus service in Bhubaneswar

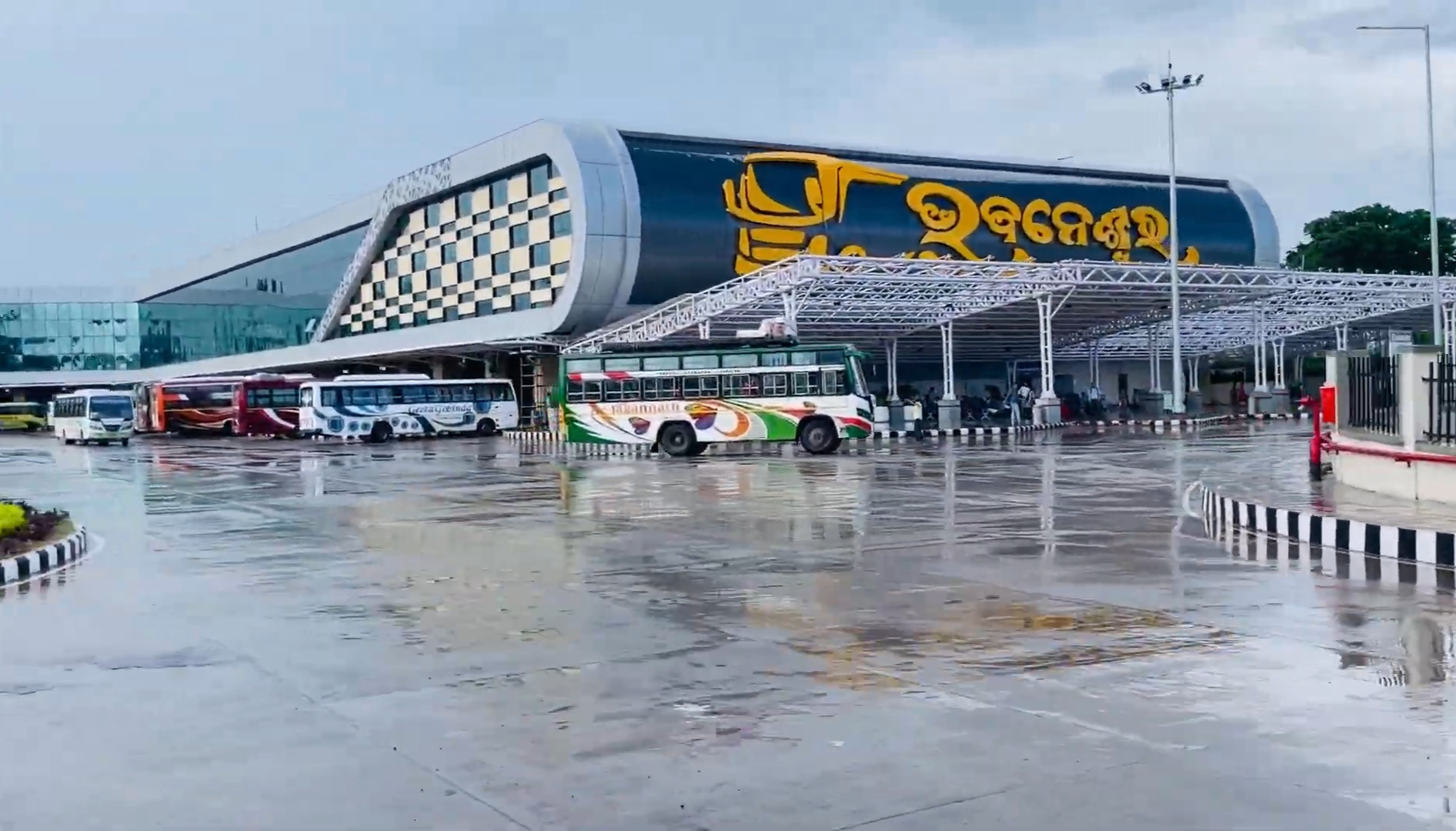
ISBT at Baramunda, Bhubaneswar

Bus transport provides an affordable and reliable public transport option for airport connectivity. The Ama Bus service, operated by the Capital Region Urban Transport (CRUT), runs scheduled city buses connecting the airport with key locations including Bhubaneswar Railway Station, major residential areas, and commercial hubs.

In addition, Airport Express (AE) and Double Decker (DD) services connect the airport with nearby cities like Cuttack and Puri, offering a low-cost alternative to taxis for intercity travellers. For long-distance bus travel, passengers typically use Inter-State Bus Terminals such as Babasaheb Bhimrao Ambedkar Bus Terminal and then transfer to local buses or taxis to reach the airport.

==== City Bus Routes ====
Route	Origin	Destination	Via
AE1	BPIA	Cuttack Netaji Bus Terminal (CNBT)	National Highway 16
AE2	BPIA	Puri Bus Stand	Kalpana Square
DD1	BPIA	Jagannath Temple, Puri	Kalpana Square
10	BPIA	Maulana Azad National Urdu University, Cuttack	Jaydev Vihar
17	BPIA	Barabati Stadium, Cuttack	National Highway 16
66	BPIA	DN Wisdom Tree Global School	Kalinga Institute of Social Sciences
82	BPIA	SCB Medical (Settlement Office)	National Highway 16

== Awards ==
The airport first gained national-level recognition in 2012–13, when it was adjudged as the best airport in India based on the Customer Satisfaction Index (CSI). The airport achieved its most significant international milestone when it won the Airport Service Quality (ASQ) Award for 2018, the results of which were announced and conferred in 2019 by Airports Council International (ACI). Under this recognition, BPIA was declared the Best Airport in the Asia-Pacific region in the 2–5 million passengers per annum category.

In 2019, the airport received the Odisha State Energy Conservation Award under the Meritorious Performance - Commercial Buildings category. The award acknowledged the airport's efforts in energy-efficient lighting, optimised air-conditioning systems, and responsible energy management practices, reinforcing its commitment to sustainable airport operations within the state of Odisha. Continuing its emphasis on environmental responsibility, BPIA earned a Level-2 Carbon Reduction certification in 2020 under internationally accepted airport carbon accreditation frameworks.

During the COVID-19 period, the airport's passenger-centric approach was again acknowledged when it received the ACI Voice of Customer Recognition in 2021. This recognition is awarded to airports that consistently collect passenger feedback and use it to improve services, even during disruptive periods.

== Accidents and incidents ==
- On 22 December 2007, an aircraft of Surya Kiran, Indian Air Force's aerobatics demonstration team, crash-landed while undergoing training exercise. After refuelling and takeoff, one of its four HAL HJT-16 Kiran jets caught fire and crash landed on the runway of Biju Patnaik Airport. The pilot was rescued with minor injuries and the exercise was immediately called off after the mishap.

== See also ==
- Airports in India
- Aviation in India
- List of airports in Odisha
- List of busiest airports in India
