= Dhubri =

- City
- Dhubri City
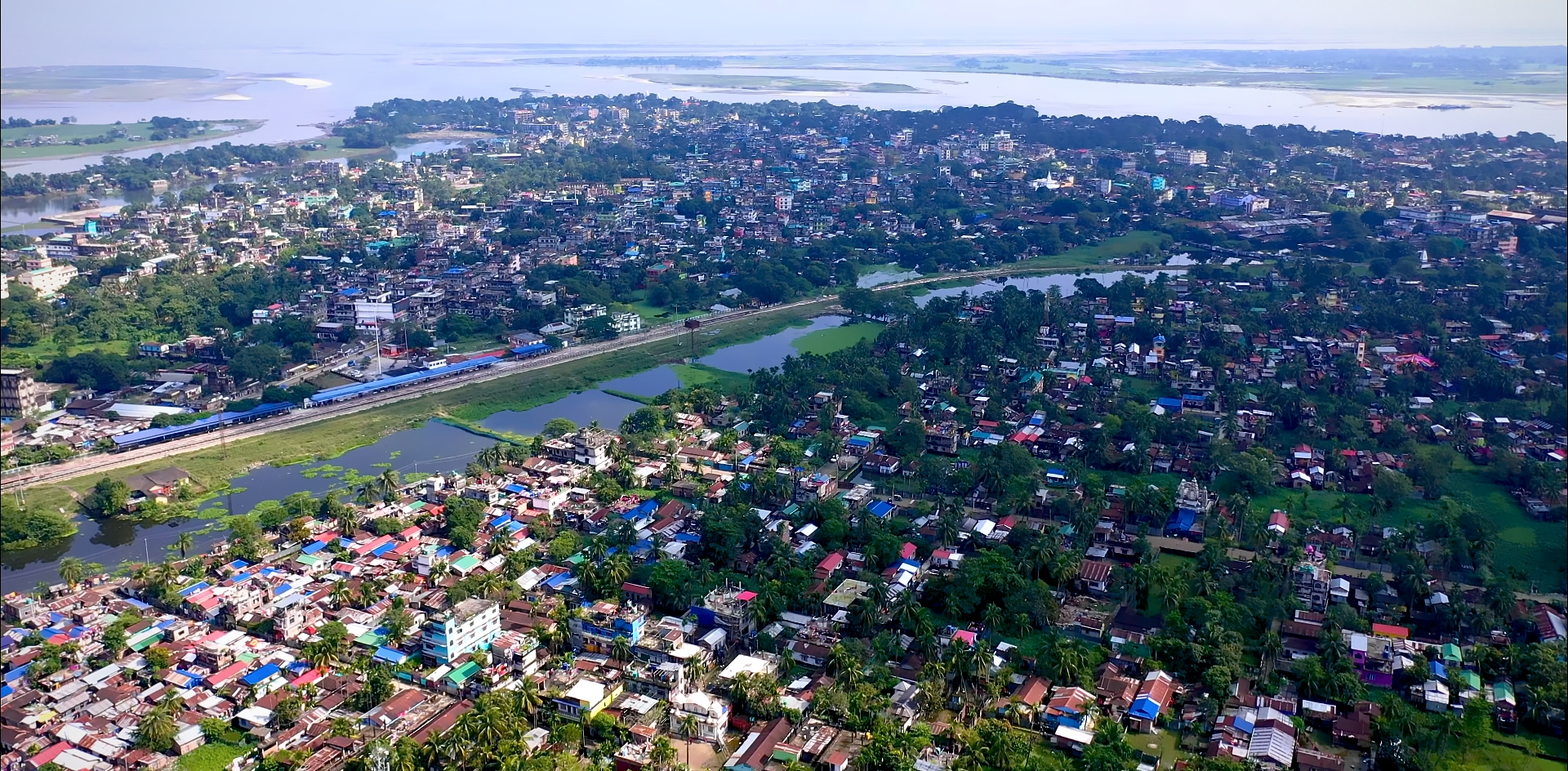
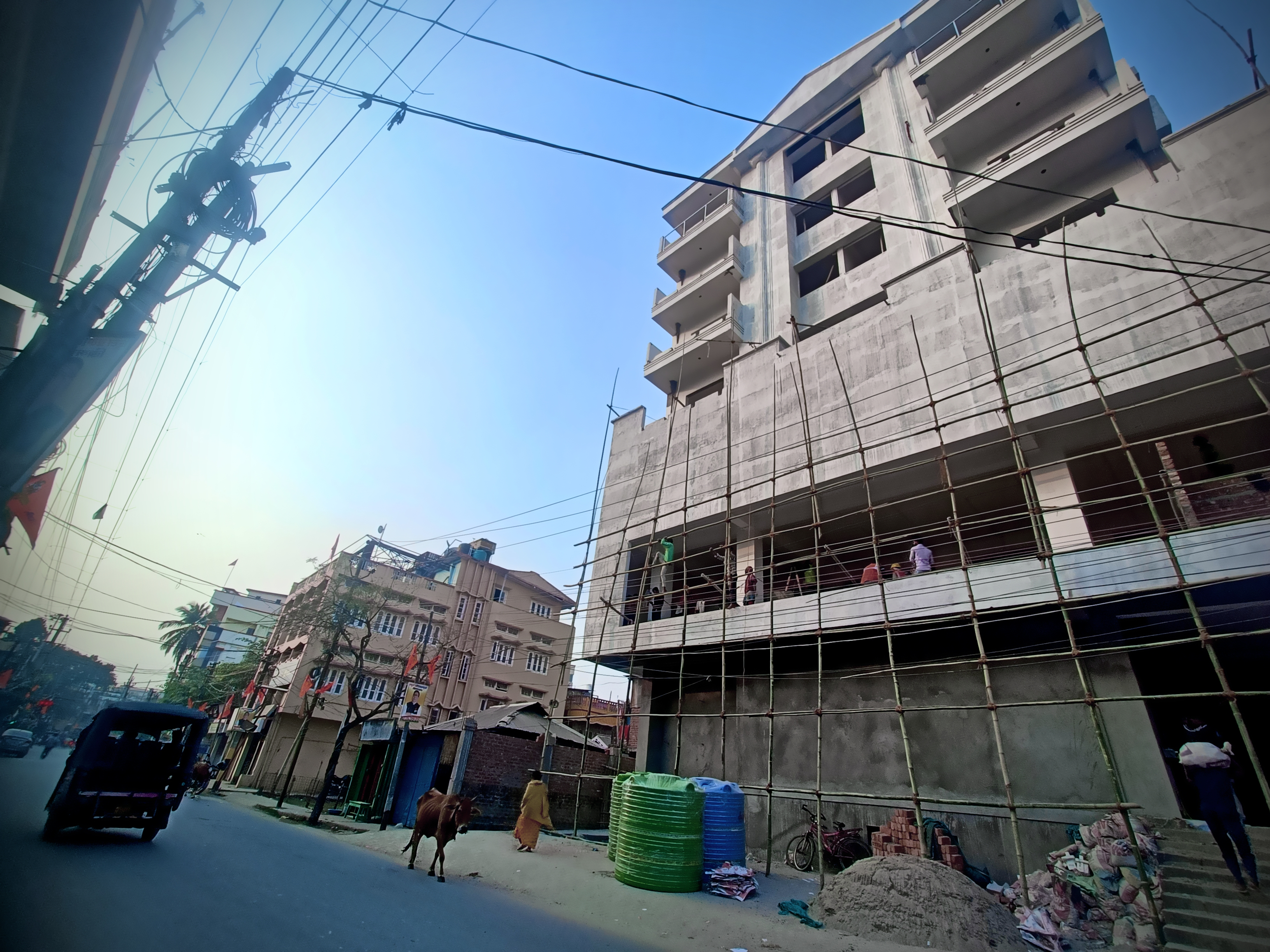
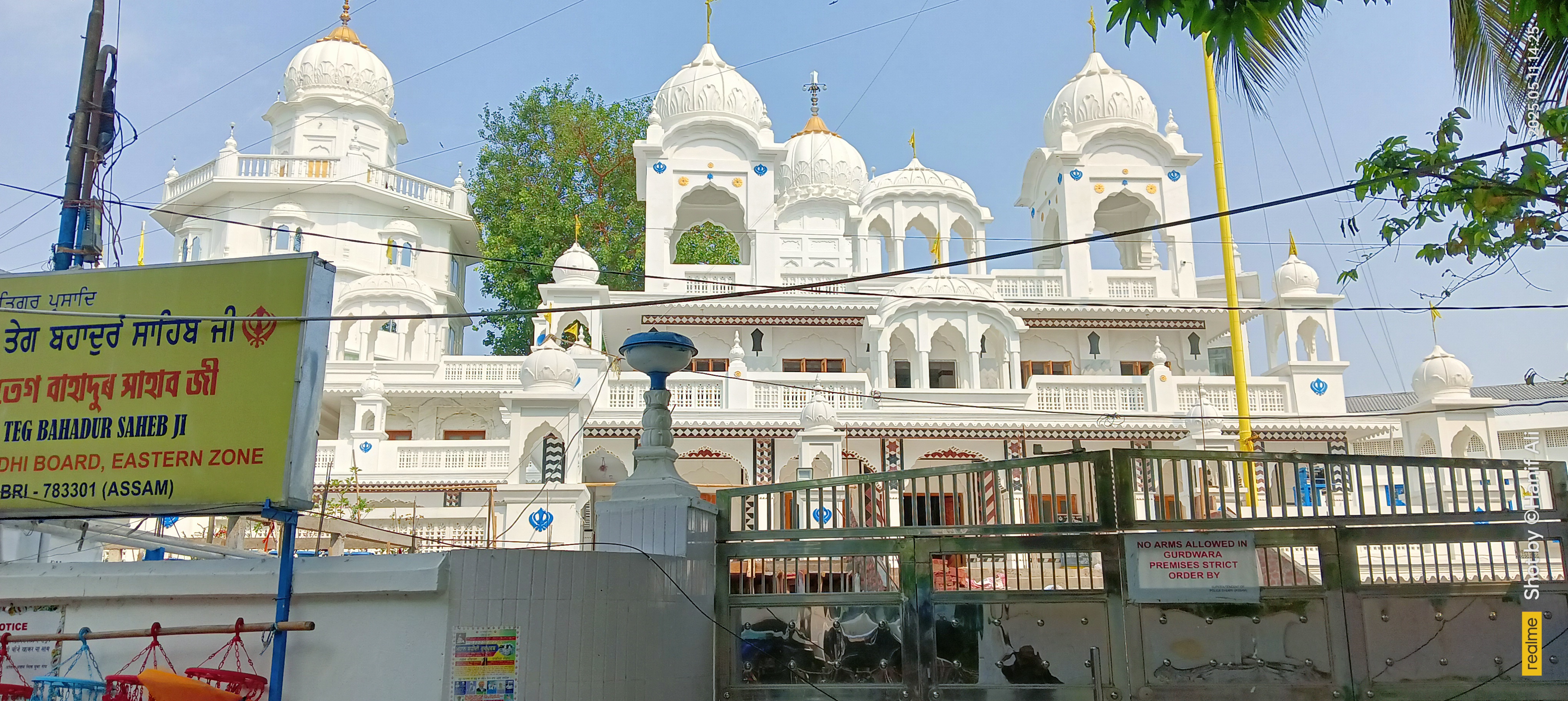
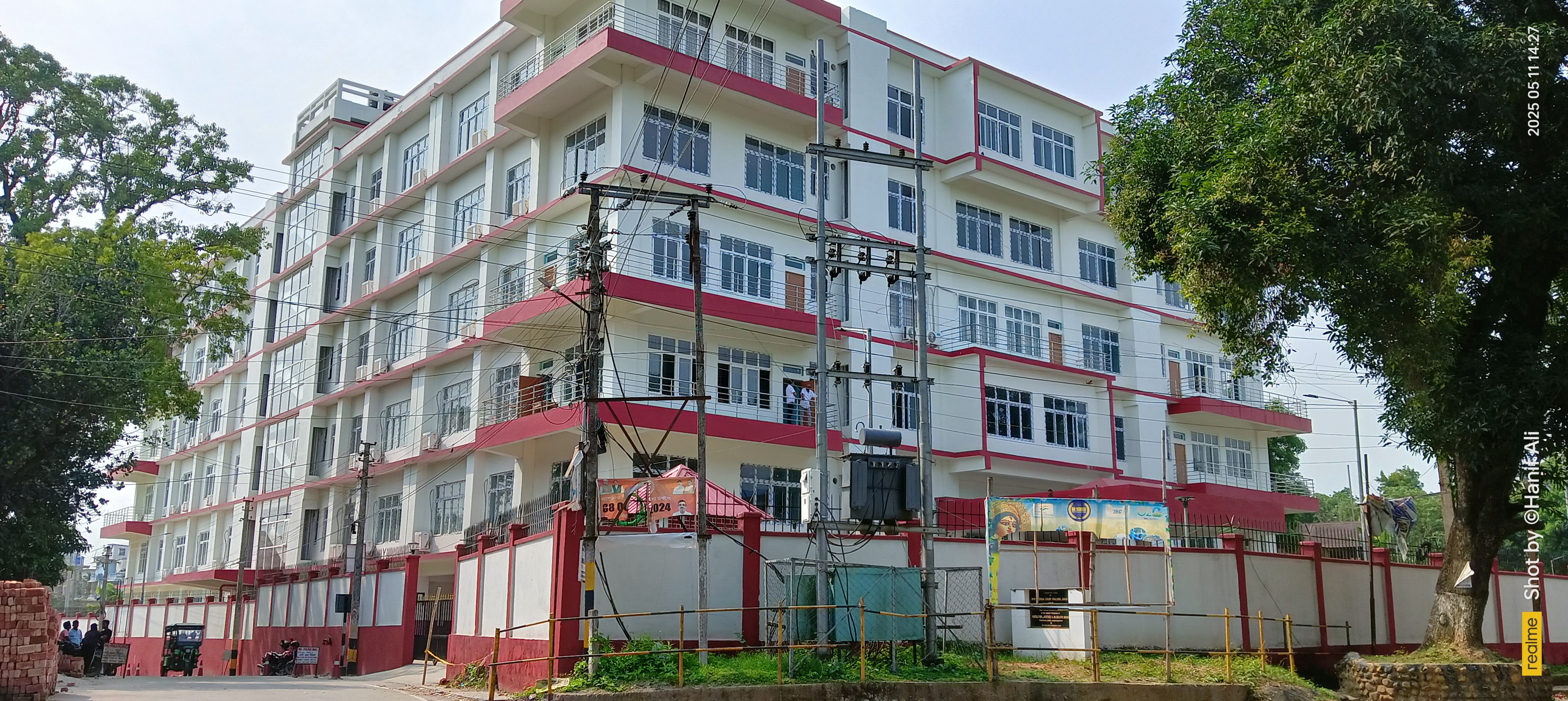
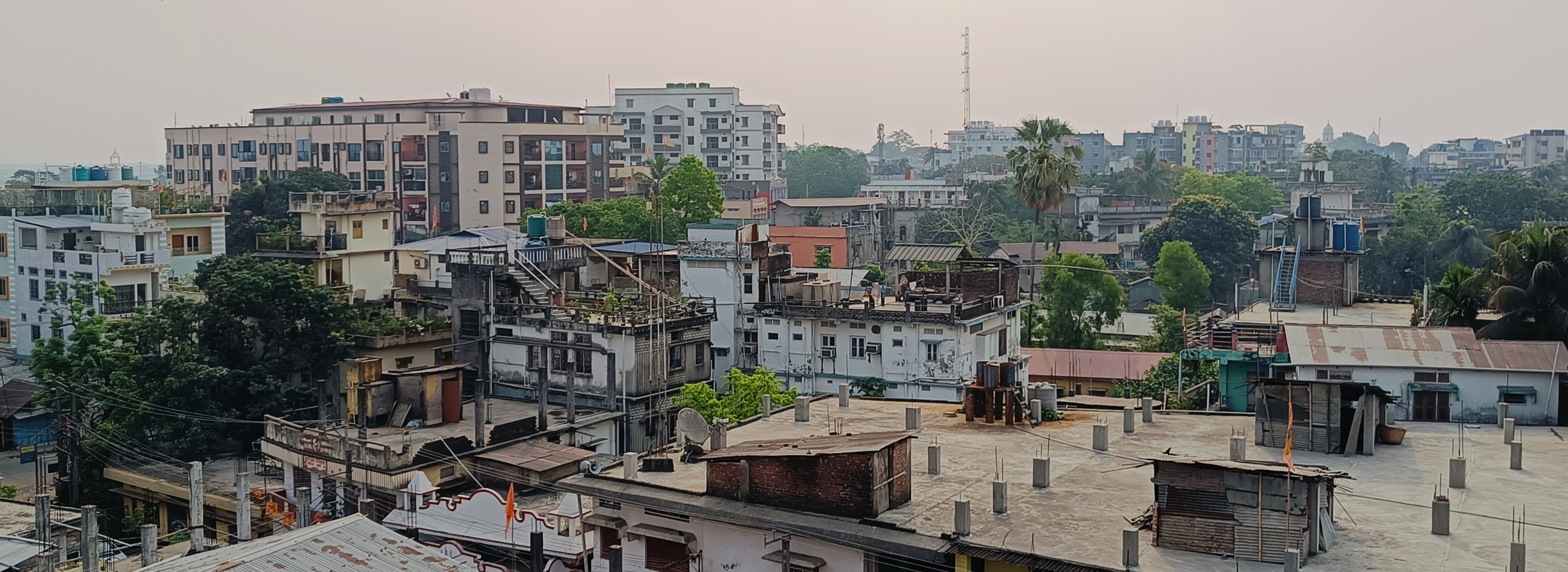
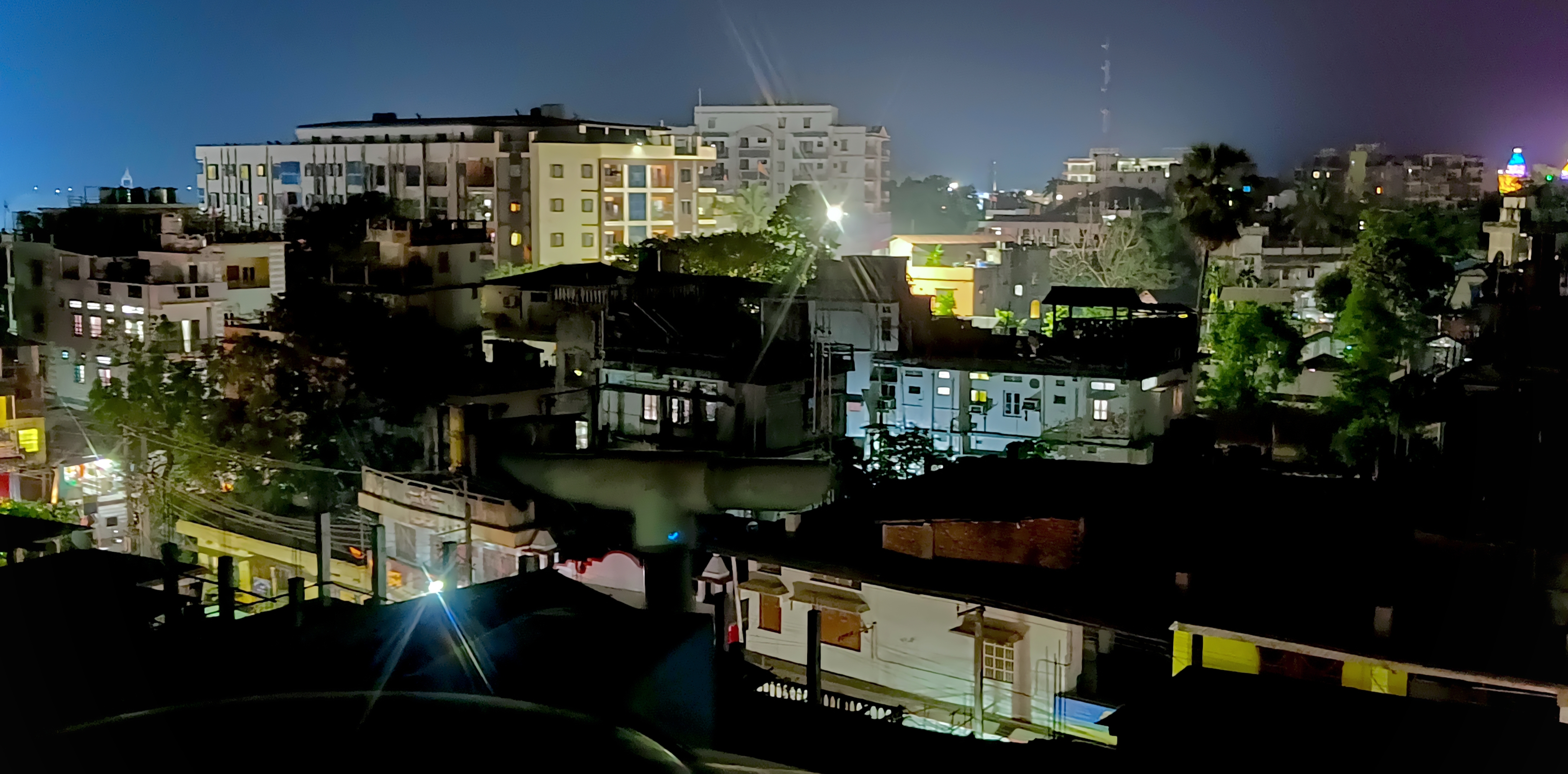
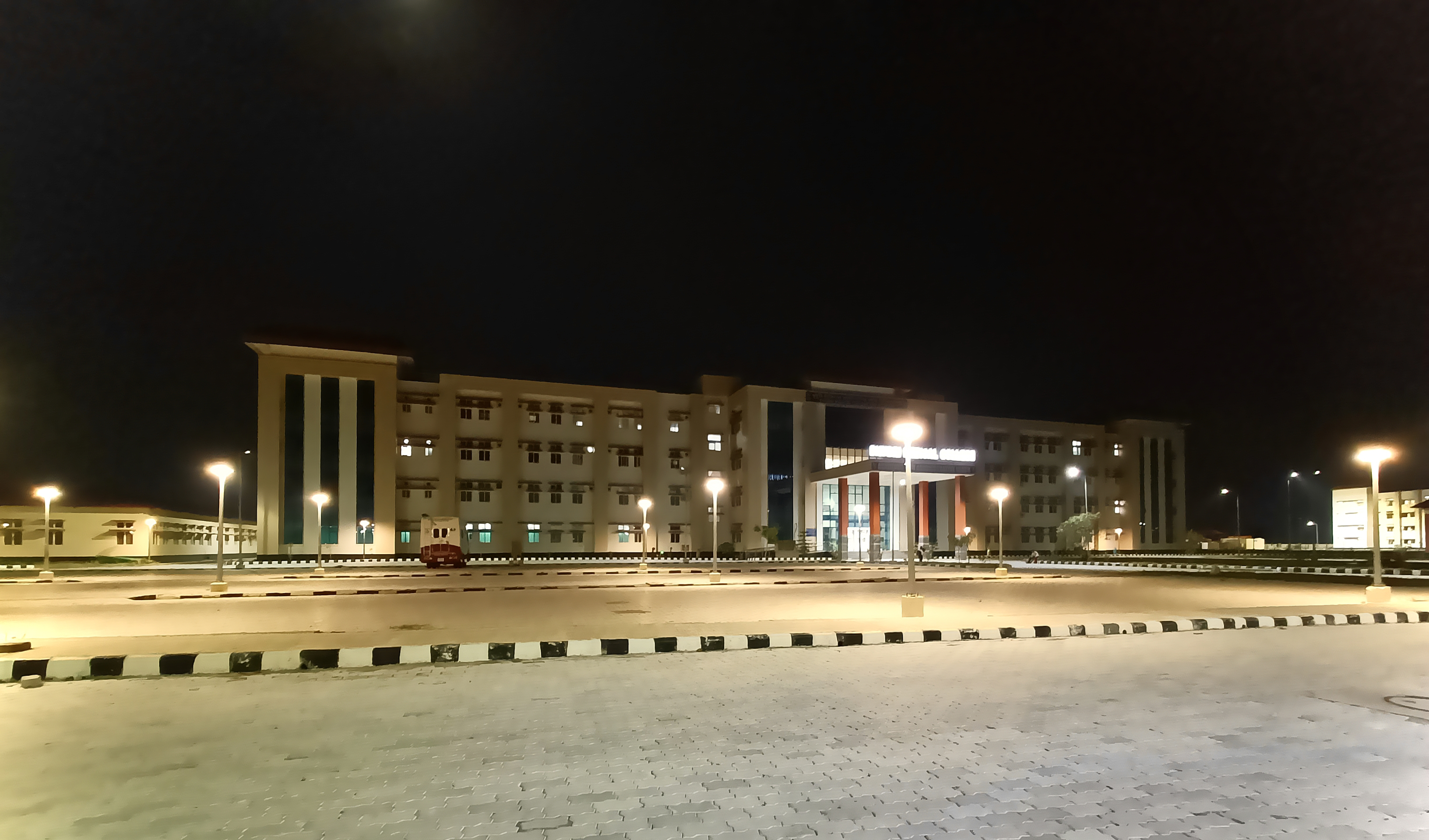
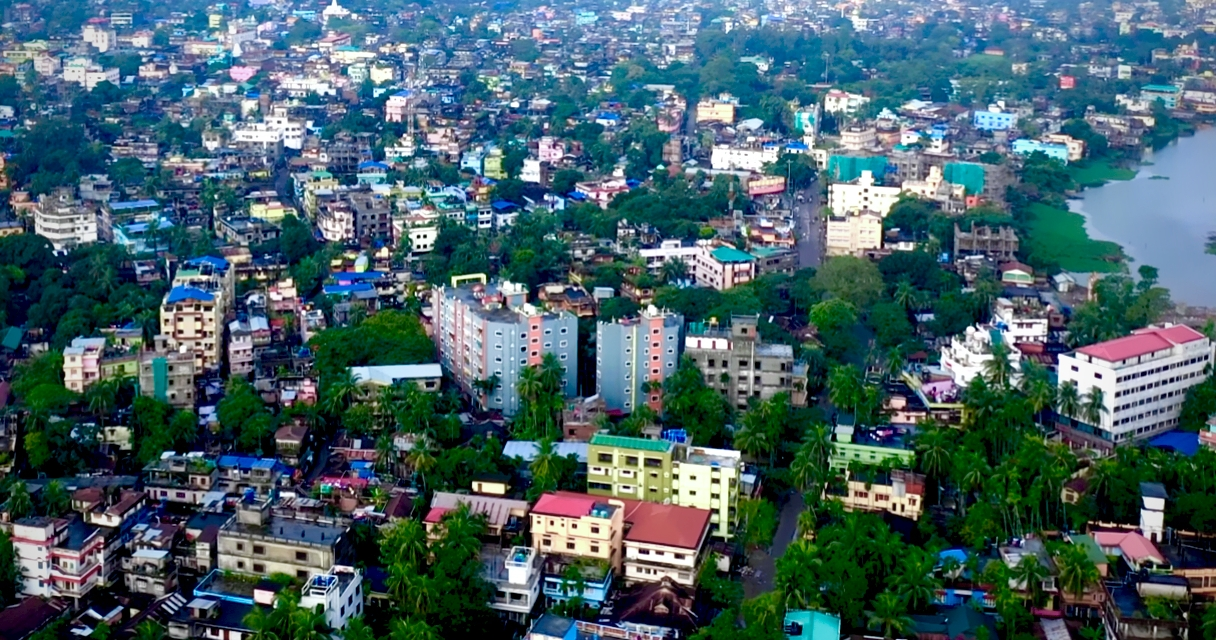
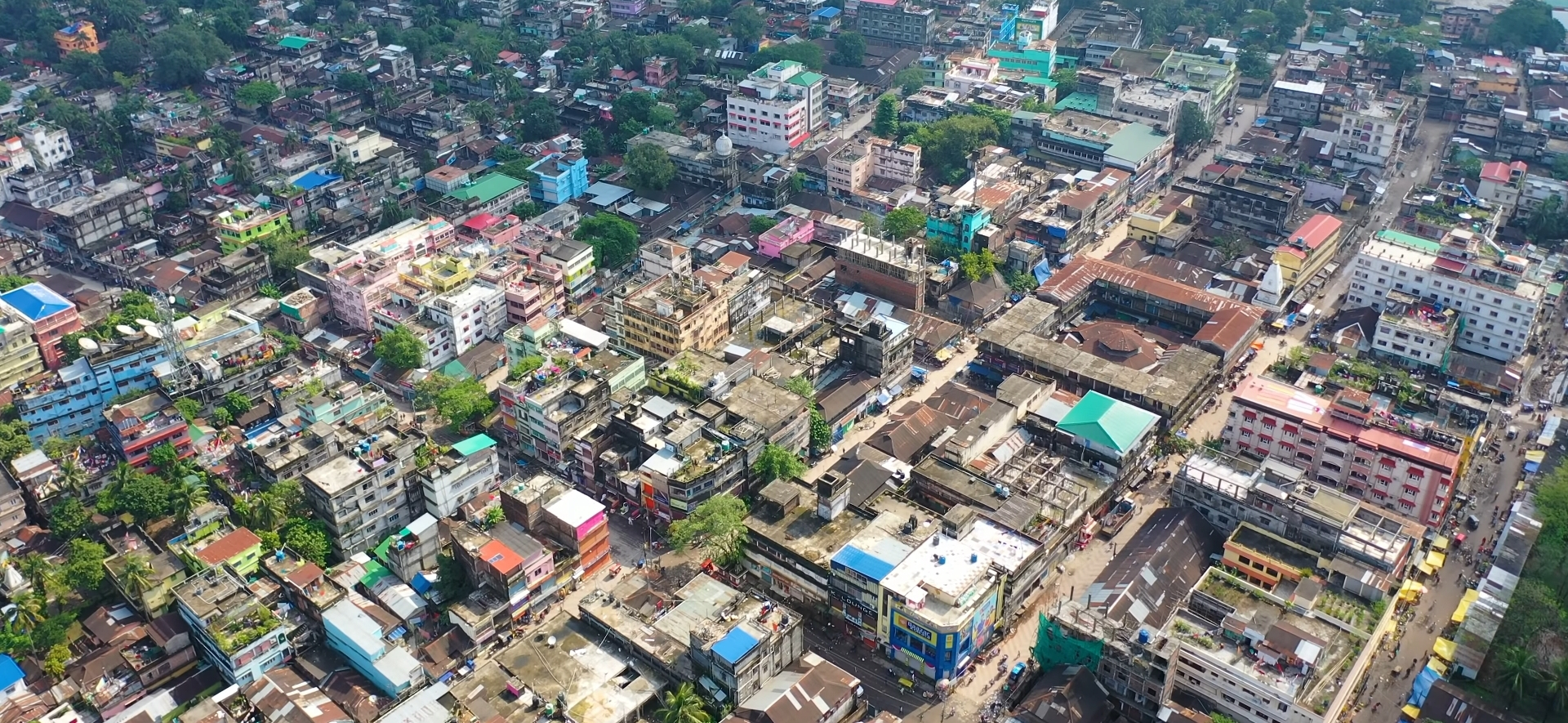
- Dhubri City Aerial View Tegh Bahadur Gurudwara District Court Harishaba Area Harishaba Area At Night DMCH Academic Building Dhubri Administrative Area Dhubri Chowk Bazar Area
- Nicknames: Land of Rivers & Jute Hub Of Assam
- Location in Assam
- Coordinates: 26.02°N 90°E
- Country: India
- State: Assam
- District: Dhubri
- Region: Lower Assam
- Established: 1883

Government
  - Type: Municipality
  - Body: Dhubri Municipal Board
  - Chairman: Debomoy Sanyal (BJP)
  - Vice-Chairman: Ivy Lata Roy (BJP)
  - Deputy Commissioner: Sri Dibakar Nath, IAS
  - Superintendent Of Police: Ms. Aparna N, IPS

Area
  - Total: 32 km^{2} (12 sq mi)
  - Water: 4.9 km^{2} (1.9 sq mi)
  - Rank: 8th in Assam

Population (2025)
  - Total: 155,000
  - Rank: 10th in Assam
  - Density: 6,300/km^{2} (16,000/sq mi)
- Demonym: Dhubrian
- Time zone: UTC+5:30 (IST)
- PIN: 783301
- ISO 3166 code: IN-AS
- Vehicle registration: AS-17
- Sex Ratio: 953 ♀️/ 1000 ♂️
- Climate: Cwa
- Official Language: Assamese
- Most spoken language: Bengali
- Literacy Rate: ▲89.34% High
- Lok Sabha Constituency: Dhubri
- Vidhan Sabha Constituency: Dhubri
- Website: https://dhubri.assam.gov.in/

Dhubri is a city and the administrative centre of Dhubri district in the Indian state of Assam. It is an old town on the bank of the Brahmaputra River, with historical significance. In 1883, the town was first constituted as a municipal board under the British regime. It is situated about 277.4 kilometres (172 mi) west from Dispur, the state capital of Assam.

The town is also an important commercial centre and had a busy river port, particularly for jute. Dhubri is called the "Land of Rivers" as it is covered on three sides by the Brahmaputra and Gangadhar rivers.

== History ==
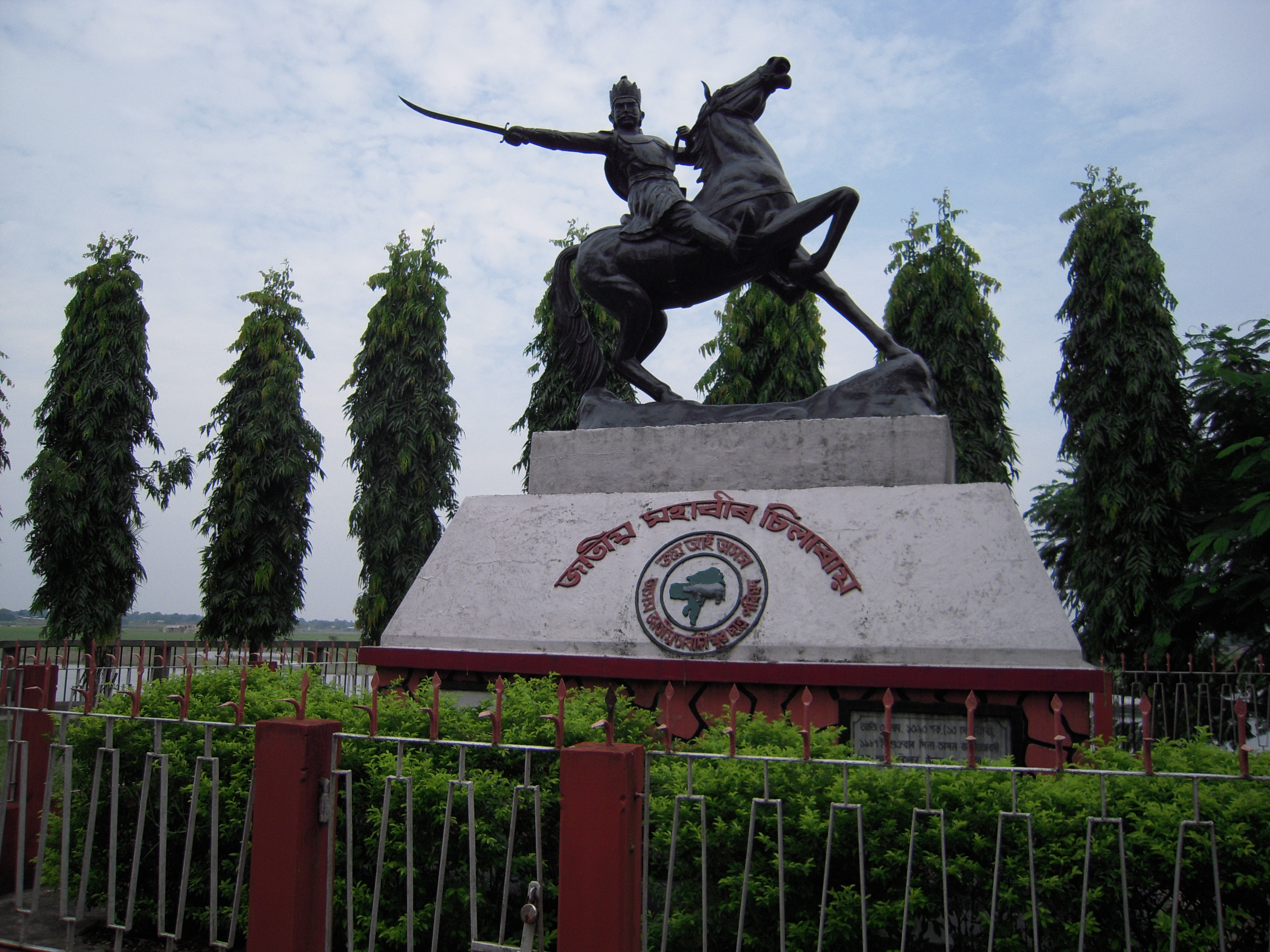
Chilarai Statue at Dhubri

Until 1874, Dhubri was mostly ruled by Koch Kings. In 1874, the British government created a new province named Assam Valley Province and incorporated Goalpara district area comprising three civil subdivisions Dhubri, Goalpara and Kokrajhar with the new Assam Province. In 1879, the district headquarters was shifted from Goalpara to Dhubri city. The district of Dhubri is again subdivided in three districts namely Dhubri, Goalpara and Kokrajhar. The City of Dhubri falls under the jurisdiction of the district of Dhubri whose headquarters is at city Dhubri.

The present Dhubri District is one of the three Civil Sub-divisions of erst-while Goalpara district, established in 1876 during British regime. In 1879 the District headquarters was shifted from Goalpara to Dhubri.

In 1983 Goalpara district was divided into four separate districts and Dhubri is one of those. Covering an area of 2,838 km^{2}. including forests, riverines, hills etc. the district has become the most densely populated district in India with a density of 584 persons per km^{2}.(As per 2001 census).

The Dhubri city was first constituted as a Municipality in 1883. The Dhubri city is 290 km far from the State Capital at Dispur.

== Demographics ==
Religion in Dhubri Town (2011)
1. Hinduism (26.1%)
2. Islam (73.5%)
3. others (0.44%)

As of 2011 India census, Dhubri had a population 63,388 and Dhubri - Gauripur Metropolitan area had a Population 1,22,400. Males constitute 51% of the population and females 49%. Dhubri has an average literacy rate of 74%, higher than the national average of 59.5%: male literacy is 79% and, female literacy is 68%. In Dhubri, 11% of the population is under 6 years of age. With close to 75% of its population Muslims, it is one of the minority concentrated districts of India.

Languages spoken in Dhubri town (2011)
1. Bengali (59.0%)
2. Assamese (19.0%)
3. Rabha (11.0%)
4. Bodo (7.00%)
5. Garo (2.00%)
6. others (2.00%)

Most of these people are Bengali Hindus, Bengali Muslims, Deshi Muslims, Koch Rajbongshi Hindus. Assamese, Goalpariya and Bengali are the major languages spoken in the town.

== Geography and climate ==
Dhubri lies at 89.5 degree east longitude and 26.1 degree north latitude, and about 34 metres or 110 feet above sea level. Dhubri is covered by rivers on three sides, predominated by mighty Brahmaputra River.

As is typical for Assam and Tripura, Dhubri has a monsoon-influenced humid subtropical climate (Köppen Cwa), being a little too cool to qualify as a tropical monsoon climate. The "cool" or winter season from November to February is warm to very warm during the afternoon, and pleasantly cool in the morning. The "hot" season of March and April is indeed hot and sees increasing humidity and rain, leading into the oppressively humid and extremely wet monsoon season from May to the middle of October.

Climate data for Dhubri (1991–2020, extremes–2020)
Month	Jan	Feb	Mar	Apr	May	Jun	Jul	Aug	Sep	Oct	Nov	Dec	Year
Record high °C (°F)	29.9 (85.8)	32.1 (89.8)	37.5 (99.5)	39.6 (103.3)	38.0 (100.4)	38.7 (101.7)	36.7 (98.1)	36.8 (98.2)	35.5 (95.9)	34.3 (93.7)	30.6 (87.1)	27.1 (80.8)	39.6 (103.3)
Mean daily maximum °C (°F)	21.4 (70.5)	25.3 (77.5)	29.6 (85.3)	30.0 (86.0)	30.5 (86.9)	31.1 (88.0)	31.1 (88.0)	31.9 (89.4)	30.9 (87.6)	29.1 (84.4)	26.2 (79.2)	22.9 (73.2)	28.3 (82.9)
Daily mean °C (°F)	17.1 (62.8)	20.4 (68.7)	24.5 (76.1)	26.2 (79.2)	27.2 (81.0)	28.3 (82.9)	29.0 (84.2)	29.4 (84.9)	28.4 (83.1)	26.6 (79.9)	22.6 (72.7)	18.8 (65.8)	24.9 (76.8)
Mean daily minimum °C (°F)	12.5 (54.5)	15.4 (59.7)	19.0 (66.2)	21.7 (71.1)	23.5 (74.3)	25.4 (77.7)	26.3 (79.3)	26.6 (79.9)	25.9 (78.6)	23.5 (74.3)	18.8 (65.8)	14.7 (58.5)	21.1 (70.0)
Record low °C (°F)	5.8 (42.4)	7.3 (45.1)	11.4 (52.5)	9.4 (48.9)	17.5 (63.5)	18.7 (65.7)	20.8 (69.4)	22.0 (71.6)	19.4 (66.9)	18.1 (64.6)	11.9 (53.4)	8.1 (46.6)	5.8 (42.4)
Average rainfall mm (inches)	7.7 (0.30)	11.4 (0.45)	65.6 (2.58)	198.4 (7.81)	351.7 (13.85)	566.2 (22.29)	359.5 (14.15)	292.5 (11.52)	294.6 (11.60)	156.9 (6.18)	3.5 (0.14)	1.6 (0.06)	2,309.6 (90.93)
Average rainy days	0.8	1.2	3.5	9.7	15.1	17.5	14.7	11.3	10.9	5.1	0.4	0.3	90.3
Average relative humidity (%) (at 17:30 IST)	74	65	59	72	79	84	86	84	86	82	77	76	84
Source 1: India Meteorological Department
Source 2: Tokyo Climate Center (mean temperatures 1991–2020)

== Colleges ==
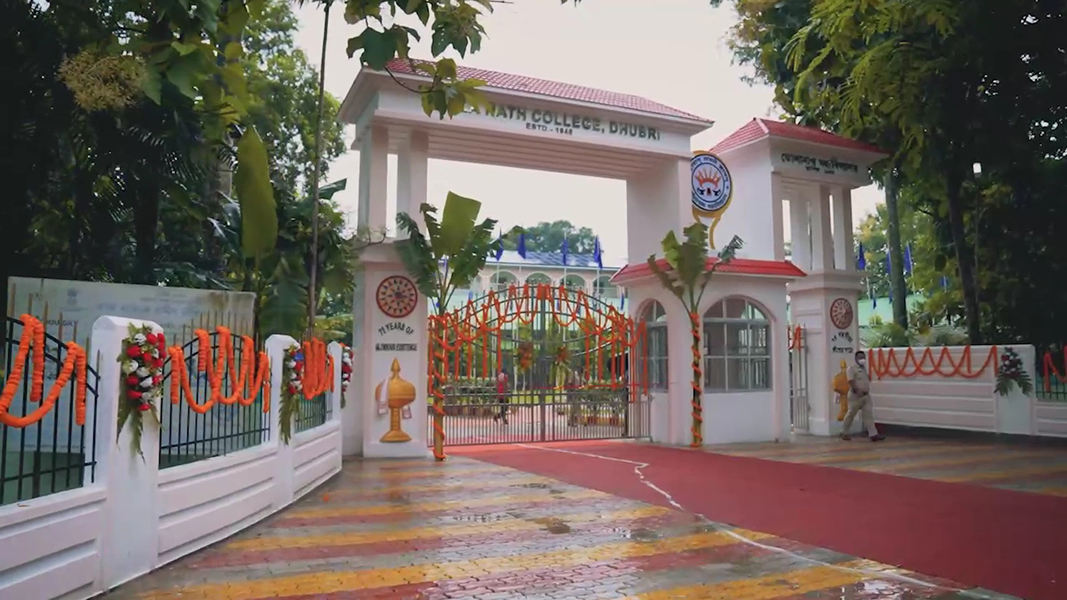
Bholanath College, Dhubri

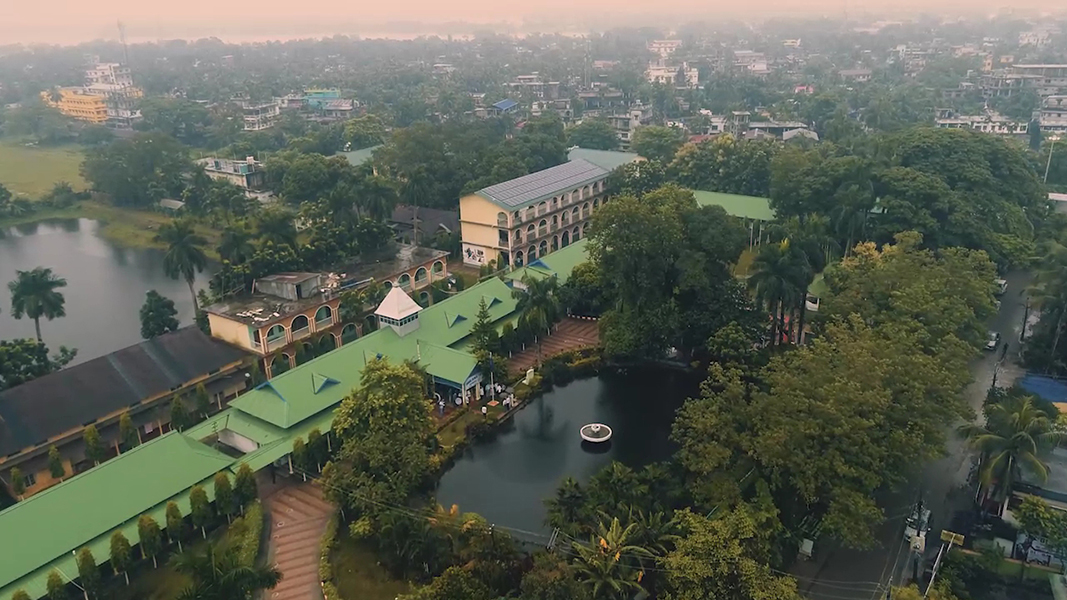
Bholanath College, Dhubri drone view

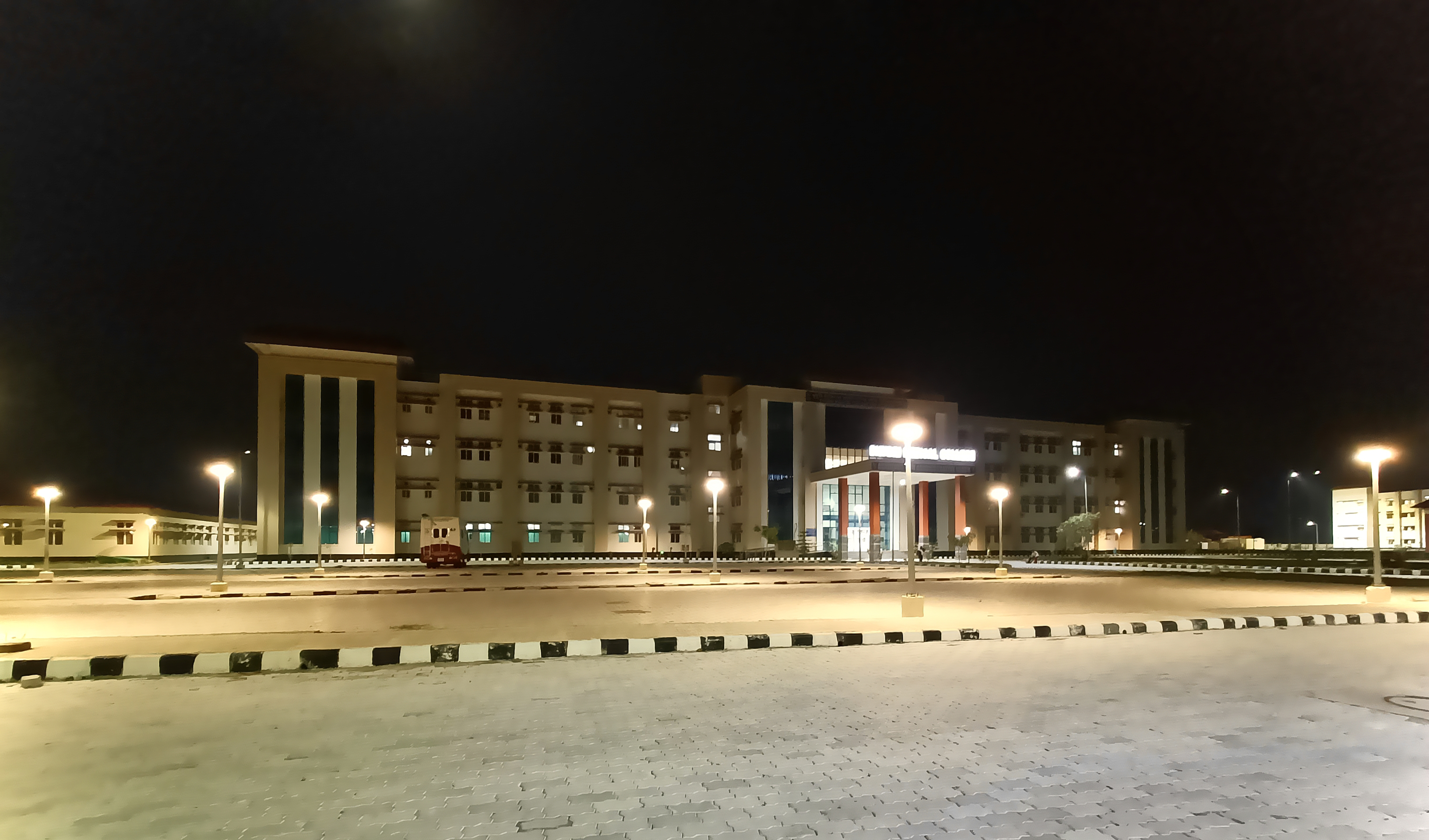
Academic Building of Dhubri Medical college & Hospital

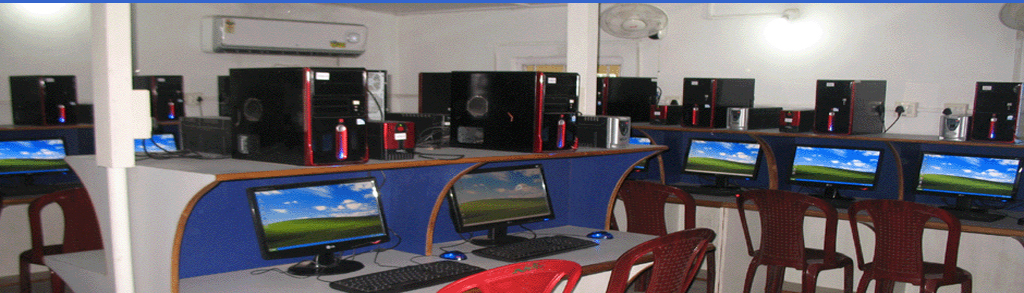
College of Advanced Technical Studies (CATS Dhubri)

Local colleges include

- Bhola Nath College or "B. N. College"' (established in 1946), the oldest college in western Assam.
- Dhubri Girls' College
- Dhubri Medical College and Hospital
- Pramathesh Barua College, Gauripur
- Jamia Millia Islamia University Open & Distance Learning Centre

== Transportation ==
=== Airport ===
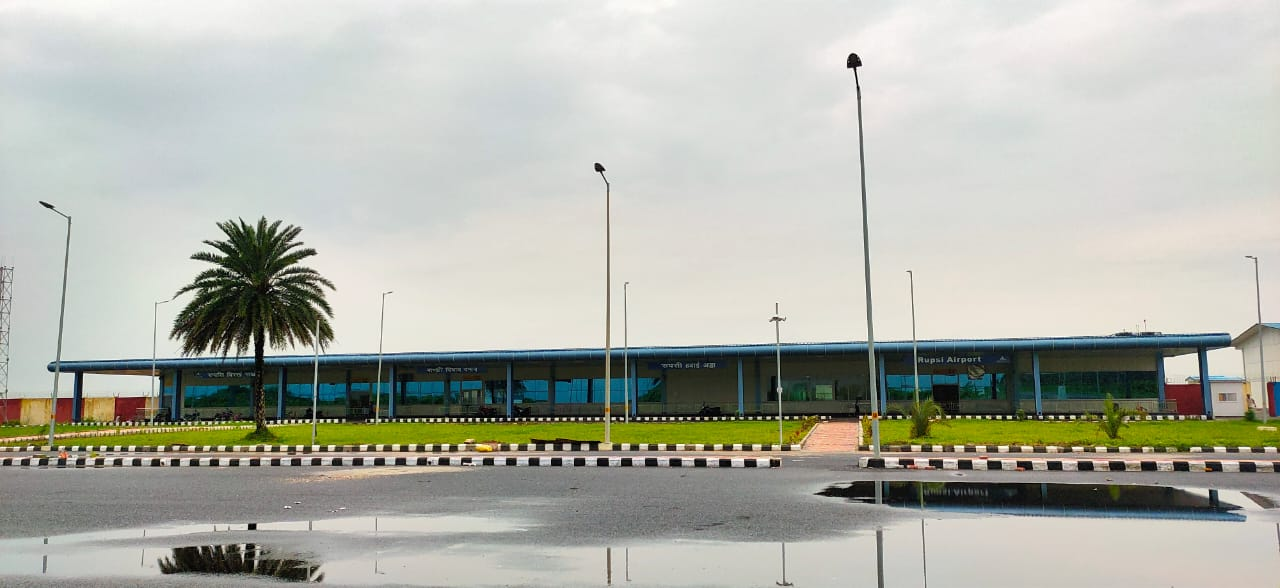
This image shows Rupsi airport, Assam, India

Rupsi Airport at Kokrajhar district is the nearest airport which is only about 15 km from the Dhubri main city and 5 km away from Gauripur town. It was constructed during World War II by the British mainly for military purpose to accommodate 52 jet airplanes. Until 1983, the Indian Airlines and some private commercial flights operated regularly between Calcutta, Guwahati and Dhubri. The airport started its commercial service after 38 years in 2021, and the airport is operational with connectivity to Kolkata and state capital Guwahati. Flybig operates flights by ATR aircraft under RCS UDAN.

=== Railway ===
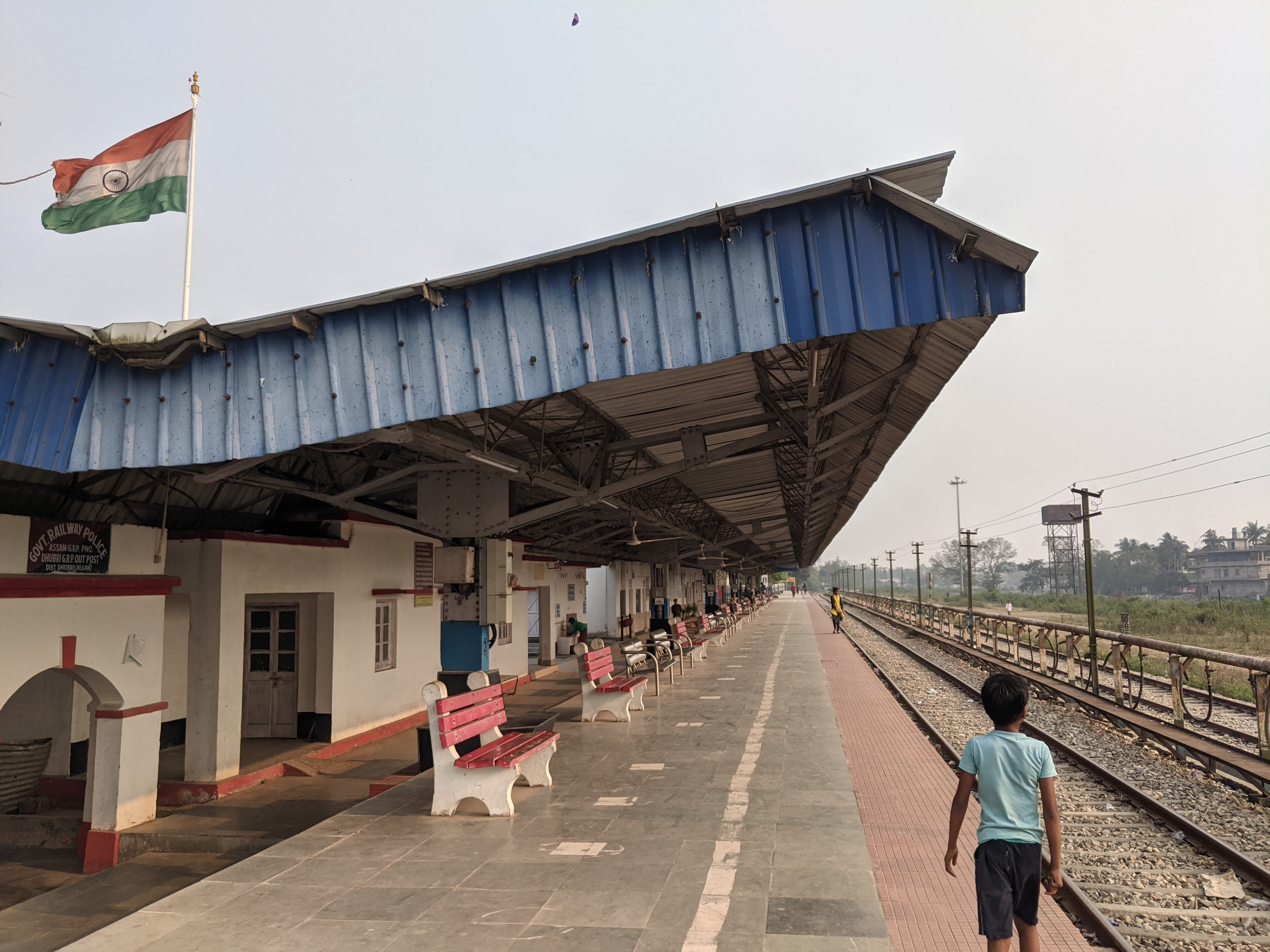
A child walking on the platform of Dhubri railway station (Indian train station in Assam) in late afternoon, with a large Indian flag flying in the background.

Dhubri railway station serves the town of Dhubri. The station lies on New Cooch Behar-Golokganj branch line and Fakiragram–Dhubri branch line of Northeast Frontier Railway, Alipurduar railway division.

== Sengajan multimodal waterways terminal ==
Dhubri multimodal waterways terminal on Brahmaputra in Dhubri is being developed as part of Bharatmala and Sagarmala projects. The city had a very busy river port on the bank of the Brahmaputra which was used as an international trade centre with the neighbouring countries, specially during the British Raj.

=== Railway ===
The importance of the railway station and the MG line was also decreased since 1947, when the direct line to Calcutta was snapped as it ran through erstwhile East Pakistan (now Bangladesh). The train service has newly started on 2010 again, and it is functioning smoothly. However the train services running from the Dhubri railway station are taking a new route from Dhubri to Kamakhya and Guwahati Junction. Trains originating from Dhubri station are, Dhubri – Silghat (Rajya Rani Express), Dhubri – Siliguri (Inter City Express) Dhubri Fakiragram passenger and New Bongaigaon Siliguri Jn Demu Special Via Dhubri

== Tourism ==
Dhubri District has a number of tourist sites, including the banks of river Brahmaputra with its green fields, blue hills and hillock. The Gurdwara Tegh Bahadur Shaibji, the Rangamati Mosque, Mahamaya Dham, Chakrasila wildlife sanctuary, Matiabagh Hawa Mahal, Satrashal Dham, Panch Peer Dargaha, and other royal palaces attract the people for their unique structures, religious sanctity and mythological importance.

Dhubri is the location of the Sikh Gurdwara Gurdwara Damdama Sahib or Thara Sahib.

=== Places of interest ===
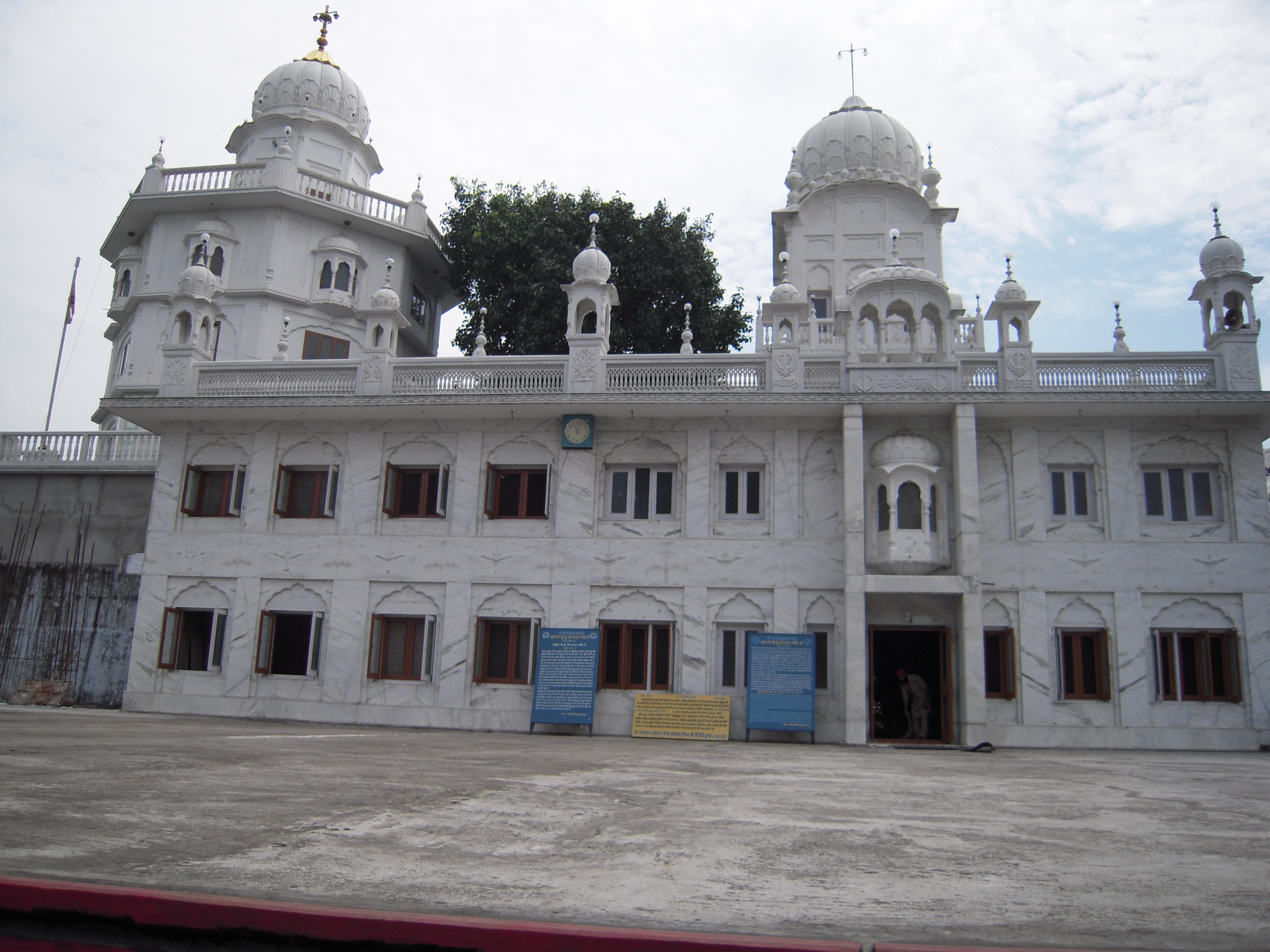
Gurdwara Sri Guru Tegh Bahadur Sahib at Dhubri

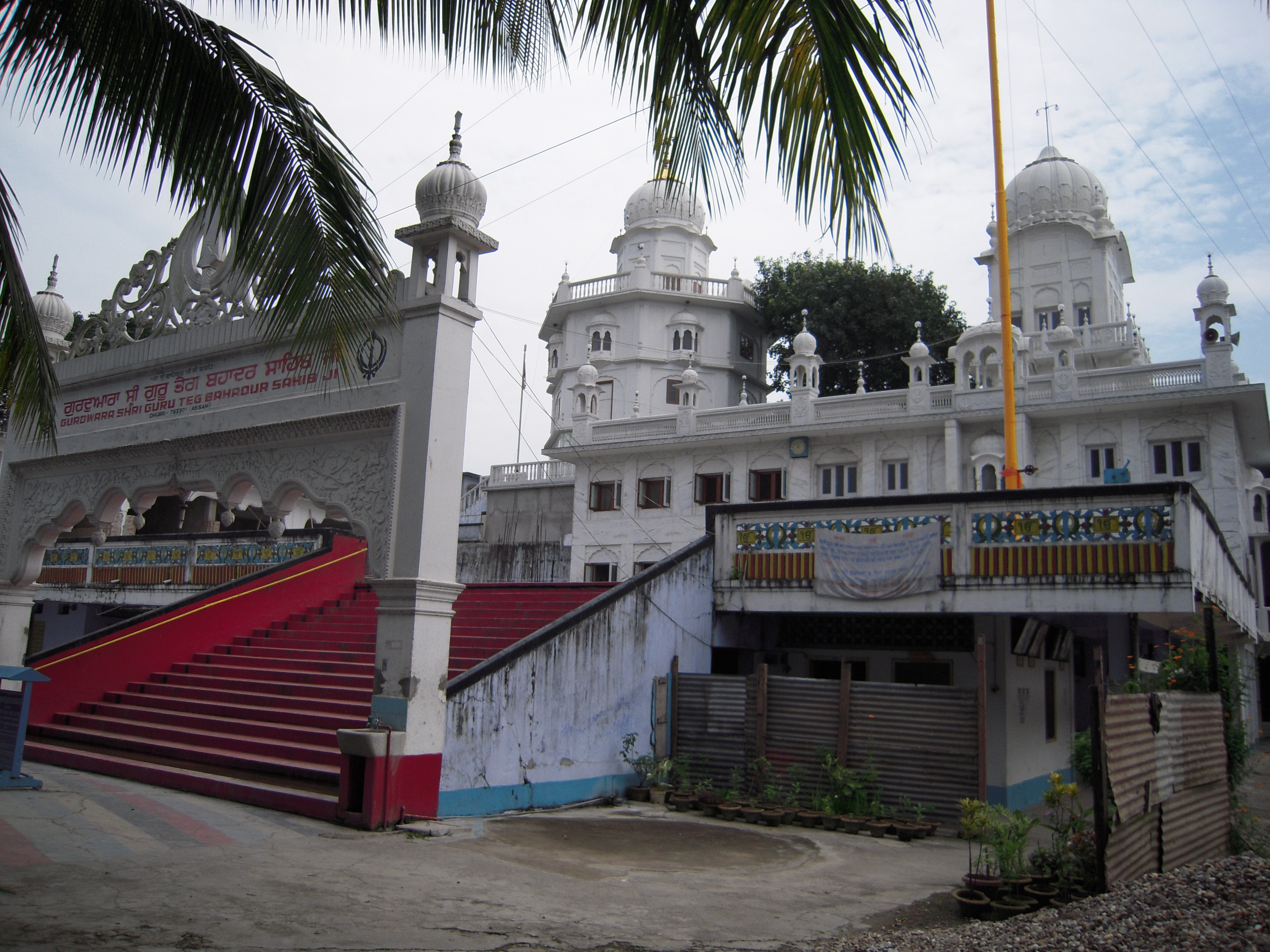
Gurdwara Sri Guru Tegh Bahadur Sahib Complex

- Mahamaya Dham and shakti pith Snan Ghat:- of Bogribari, about 30–35 km east from Dhubri town is next to Kamakhya (Guwahati) and Madan-Mohan (Cooch Behar). Originally the mother Goddess Mahamaya of Parvatjowar was worshipped by the local people like Kacharies, Koches and Naths. It was the presiding deity of the Jaminder of Parvatjowar. Nowadays the mother Mahamaya is worshipped by all Hindus.
- Gurdwara Sri Guru Tegbahadur Sahibji: In the middle of the Dhubri Town and on the bank of the river Brahmaputra, this Gurdwara is situated. Sikh Guru Nanak visited this place in 1505 AD and met Sri Sankardeva during Guru Nanak Devji's way from Dhaka to Assam. Thereafter the Ninth Sikh Guru Teg Bahadur came to this place in the year 1666 and established the Gurdwara during 17th century accompany of Raja Ram Singh. Sikh devotees assemble in this Gurdwara every year in the month of December to mark the Martydom of Sri Guru Teg Bahadur with due solemnity and ceremony. Sikh devotees called reverence of Sahidee-Guru-Parav.
- Panchpeer Dargaha: It is a Mazar Sharif of five Sufi Saints who accompanied Raja Ram Singh during his time of Mughal conflict with the Ahom Regime of Assam. Guru Tegh Bahadur had also accompanied the Sufi Saints.
- Rangamati Mosque: Rangamati Mosque or Panbari Mosque was built during 17th century by Hussain Shah, the Governor of Bengal (belonging to the pre-Mughal period which can be recognised from its typical architectural design). It is located in Panbari vicinity which is around 25 km from township of Dhubri. Rangamati area was once prosperous during the reign of the Koch rulers as a frontier post. During the Mughal era Rangamati was a large fort of the Mughal Army. This unique Mosque was used as a prayer place by the Muslim Soldiers. There is also an Idgah and a deep well which were also constructed during the same period. Believers from all religious backgrounds visit this mosque and often throw coins in the well.
- Other significant features: Two wetlands – Dheer Beel and Diplai Beel adjoin Chakrasila wildlife Sanctuary. These two Beels are home to a large number of fishes, turtles, prawn and birds both indigenous and migratory.
- Chakrasila Wildlife Sanctuary: In 1994 Chakrasila Hill Reserve Forest was declared as Chakrasila Hill Wildlife Sanctuary by the government of India covering 4558.7 hectares of land. The distribution of varieties of plant species in Chakrasila provides diverse niches for many species of wildlife. The significant golden langur exists in Chakrasila Wildlife Sanctuary in addition to other mammals like leopards, leopard cats, porcupines, pangolins, flying squirrels and civet cats. Adjutant storks, Indian owls, mynas, parakeets, doves, hornbills, jungle fowls, kingfishers, herons, darters, snipes and teals are the birds commonly found. Pythons, monitors, craits, cobras, turtles, teads and frogs are some reptiles and amphibia that are also found. It is in the Kokrajhar district and about 5 km from Kokrajhar town and 70;km from Dhubri Town. This sanctuary provides facilities and activities such as bird watching, forest trekking, wildlife and nature photography. Local guides are available on payment. There is a site for erecting tents and free accommodation for a group of 15 individuals with hygienic drinking water in the camp Tapoban provided by the local NGOs.
- Florican Garden: A newly setup garden-cum-natural park located at Bilasipara about 50 km from Dhubri Town.
- Pagalathan Temple: A Shiva temple along with some others temples and Chandardinga Hill, the hill said to have originated on the sank ship of Chand Saudagar (Chand Trader from Behula-Lakhindar) in Salkocha near the Brahmaputra River located about 60 km from Dhubri. This place allows the view of Brahmaputra on one side and Chandardinga hill on other at Mahadevs foot.
- Others: Other tourist places include Matiabag Palace at Gauripur, Netai Dhubuni Ghat at Dhubri Town, Chandardinga Hillock, Dudhnath Mondir at Salkocha, Ramraikuti at Satrasal, Airport of World War II and Soreswar beel at Rupshi ok Kokrajhar district, Dhubri matches factory.

== Parks ==
- Netai Dhubuni Park
- Rajiv Gandhi Children Park
- Victoria Memorial Park

== Flora and fauna ==
On 14 July 1994, a virgin little forest patch of Dhubri District but mostly that is 95% in Kokrajhar district of Assam was declared as a wildlife sanctuary by the gazette notification of the Assam Government. This sanctuary has been named as "Chakrashila Wildlife Sanctuary". This is the youngest sanctuary of the North East India having an area of 11,260.00 acres (45.5676 km^{2}). Chakrasila is unique because of the presence of golden langur (Presbytis geei) which is found nowhere else except along the Assam and Bhutan border. Besides, the virgin forest of Chakrasila Wildlife Sanctuary is endowed with rare specimens of trees, shrubs, medicinal plants, mammals, reptiles and exquisite birds and insects.

Geographical location of the Chakrasila Wildlife Sanctuary is in the latitude 26° 15' to 26° 26' N and longitude 90° 15' to 90 ° 20' E. It is in the District of Dhubri that is only 5% but mostly that is 95% in Kokrajhar district, the westernmost region of Assam. It is 68 km from the District headquarters Dhubri and 219 km from the Borjhar Airport of Guwahati City.

There are several small springs for quenching the thirst of the wild animals of this hilly forest. There are also two major perennial springs in the sanctuary at Howhowi Jhora and Bamuni Jhora.

Climatic conditions of Chakrasila Wildlife Sanctuary is like that of temperate zone with dry winter and hot summer followed by heavy rains. Annual rainfall is between 200 and 400 cm. Soil is azonal, forestlike and hilly. temperature throughout the year generally varies between 8 °C to 30 °C.

The diverse ecosystems of Chakrasila present habitat diversity and support various mammalian species like tiger, leopard, golden langur, leopard cat, gaur, mongoose, porcupine, pangolin, flying squirrel, and civet cat. Chakrasila also has a wide variety of avifauna.

The two internationally recognised wetlands namely Dhir and Deeplai has not been yet taken inside the declared boundary of the sanctuary. But they are very a part of the Chakrasila eco-system. It is expected that in due course they will be included within the sanctuary. Courtesy : Nature's Beckon ( An Environmental Activist of North-East )

== Politics ==
Dhubri is part of Dhubri (Lok Sabha constituency).

Rakibul Hussain of Indian National Congress is the current Member of Parliament from Dhubri, serving in the 18th Lok Sabha.

== Media ==
Dhubri has an All India Radio Relay station known as Akashvani Dhubri. It broadcasts on FM frequencies.

== Notable people ==
- Pramathesh Barua, Bollywood filmmaker
- Jamuna Barua, Bollywood actress
- Padma Shri Pratima Barua Pandey, singer
- Abdul Hamid Khan Bhashani, Co-founder of Awami League, Peasant Leader
- Vijay Saxena, Bollywood actor
- Priyadarshini Chatterjee, Femina Miss India World in 2016
- B. C. Sanyal, painter, sculptor, Art teacher
- Sarat Chandra Sinha, fifth Chief Minister of Assam, social activist.
- Rebati Mohan Dutta Choudhury, noted Bengali, Assamese litterateur.
- Tapas Sen, Theatre Artist
- Saifuddin Ahmed, Winner Of Bangladesh National Film Award for Best Supporting Actor
- Padma Shri Parbati Barua, Internationally acclaimed "Queen of the Elephant".
- Javed Zaman, Indian first-class cricketer

== Photo Gallery ==
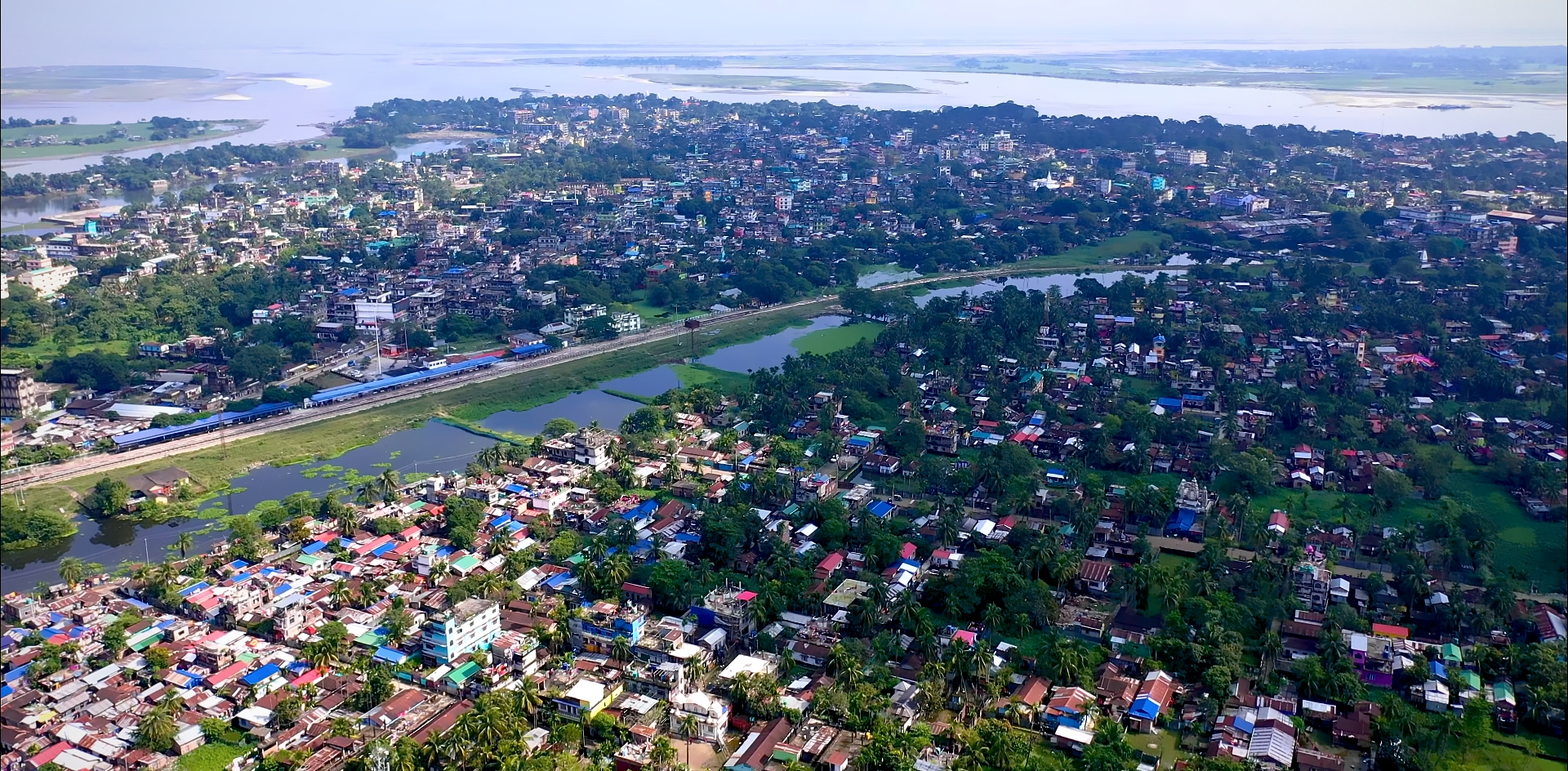
Dhubri City Aerial View

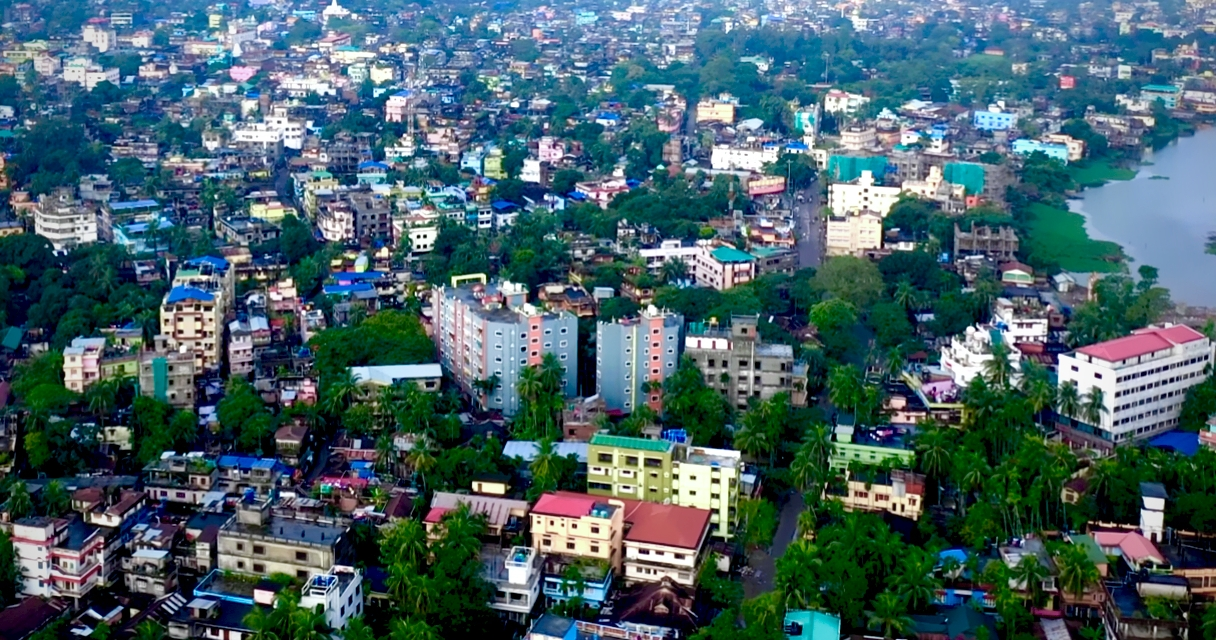
Dhubri City Skyline View

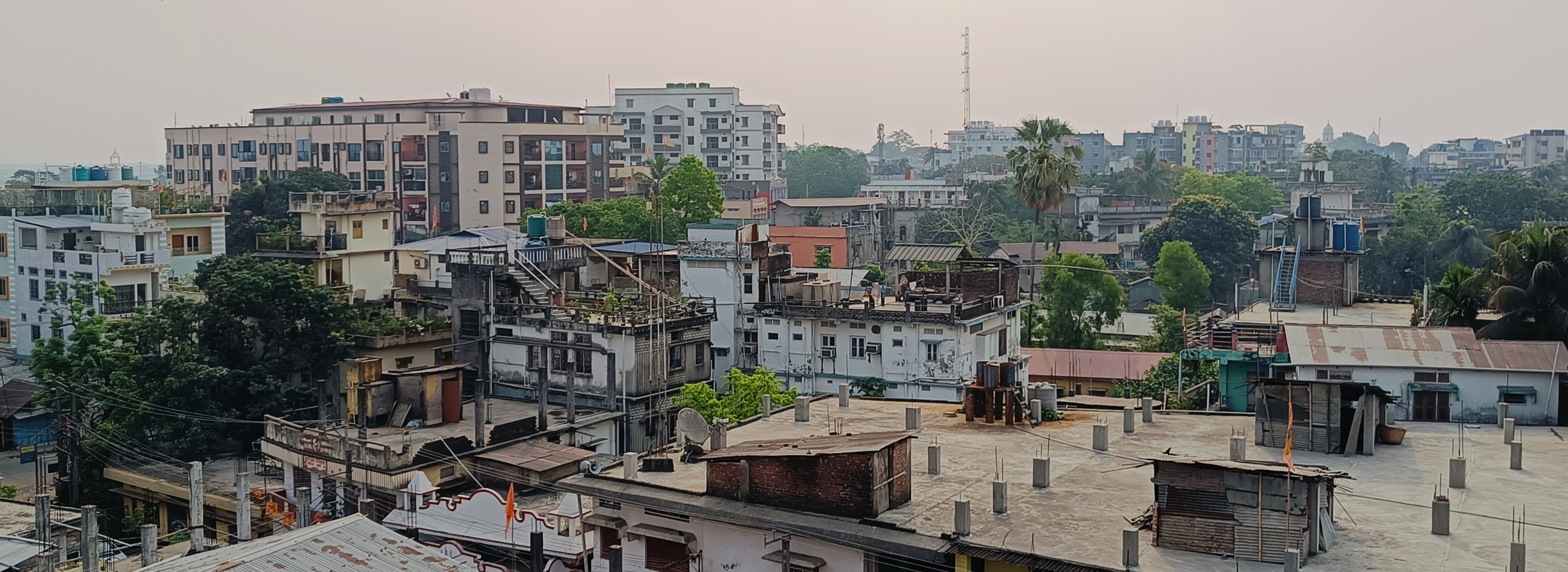
Dhubri Harishaba area skyline view

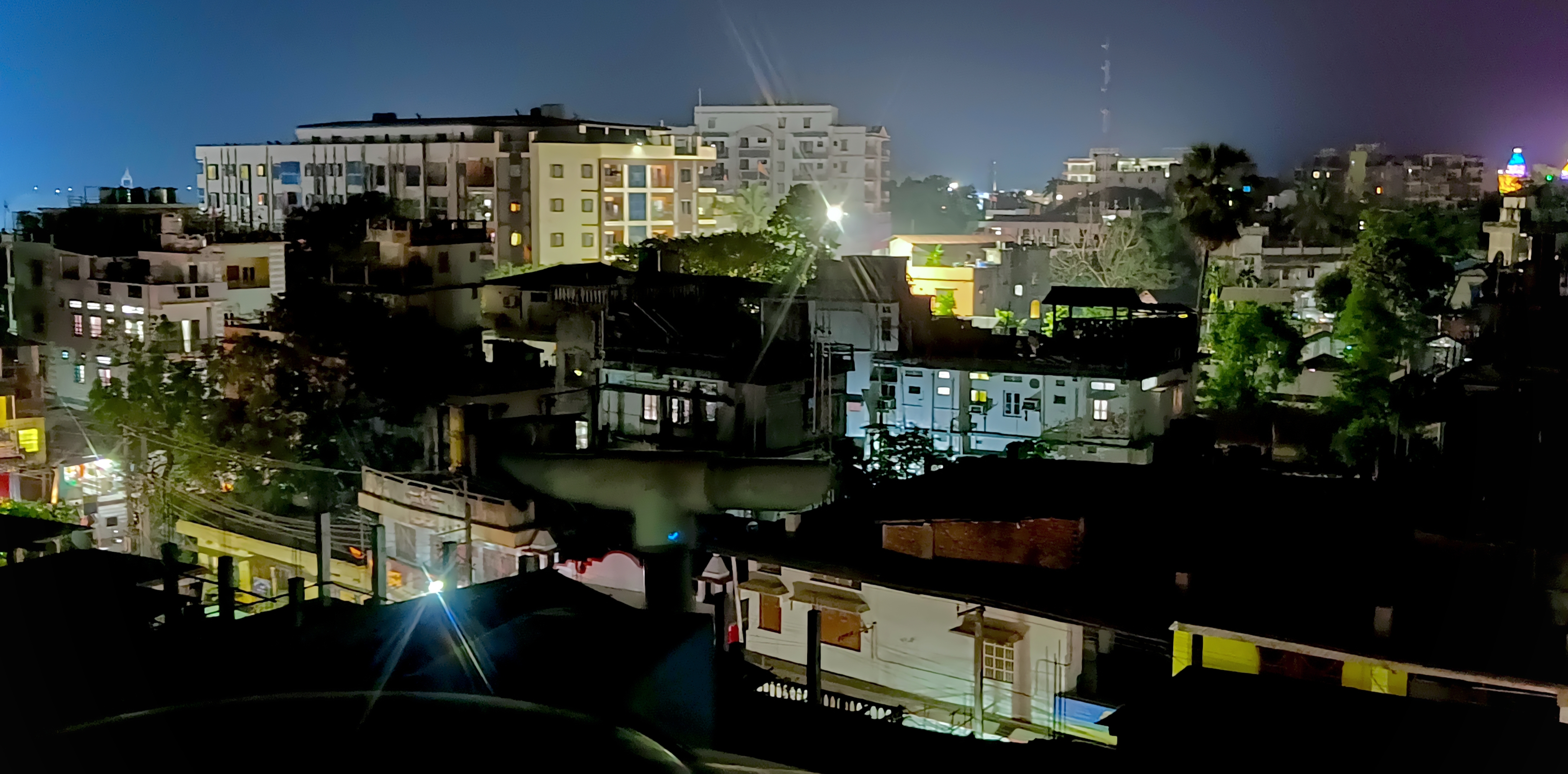
Dhubri city night view

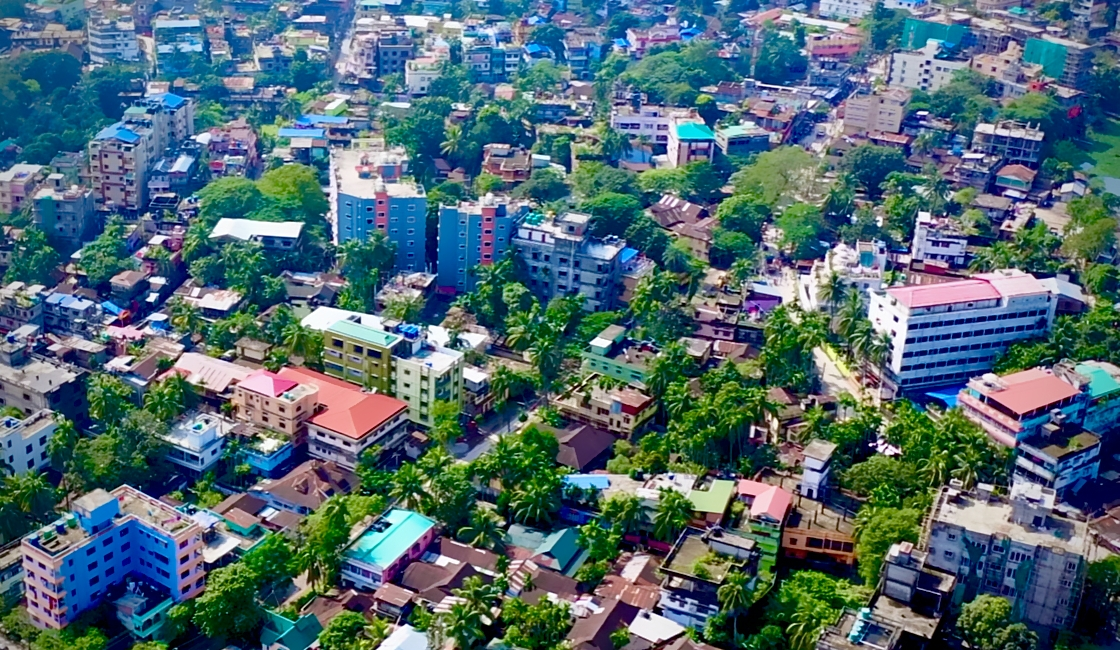
Dhubri City Skyline View

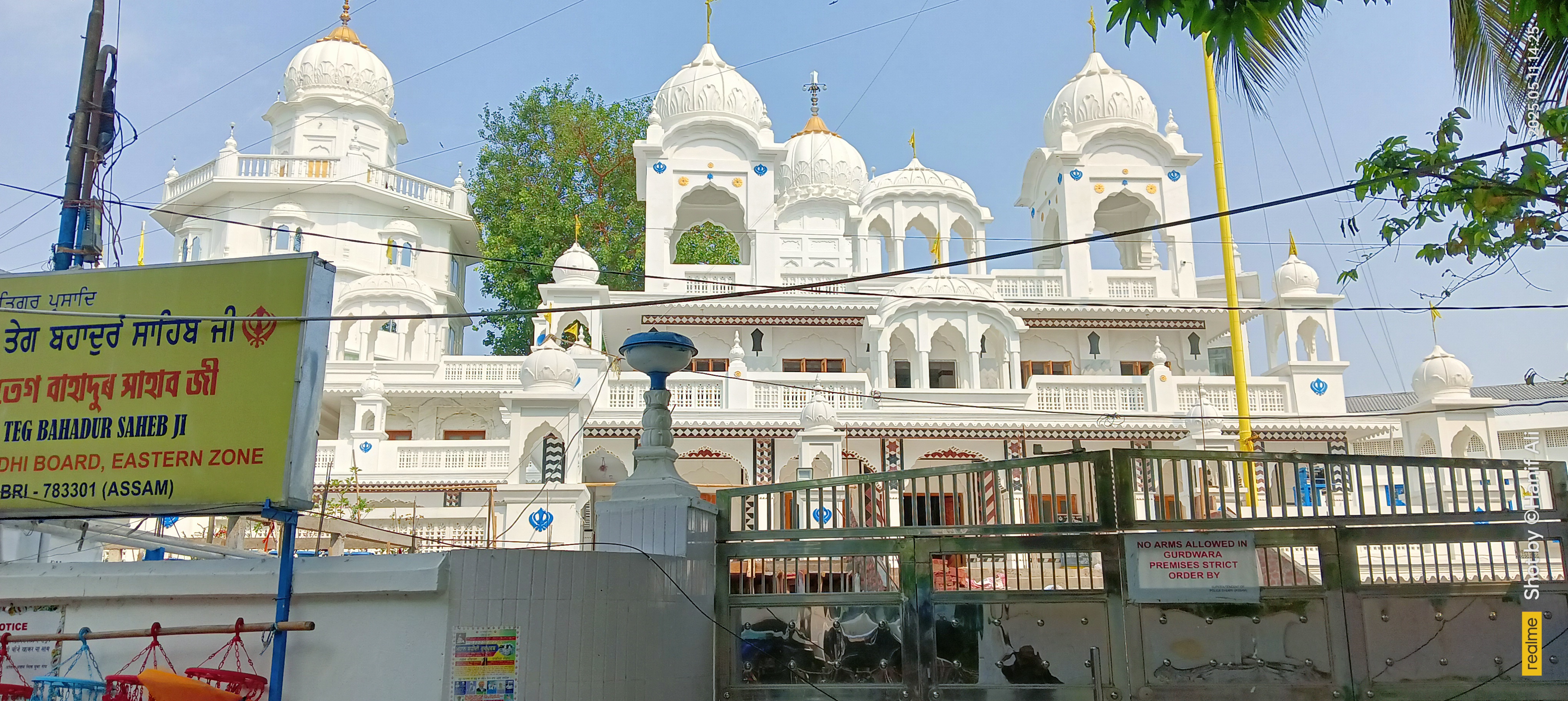
Gurdwara Sri Guru Tegh Bahadur Sahib

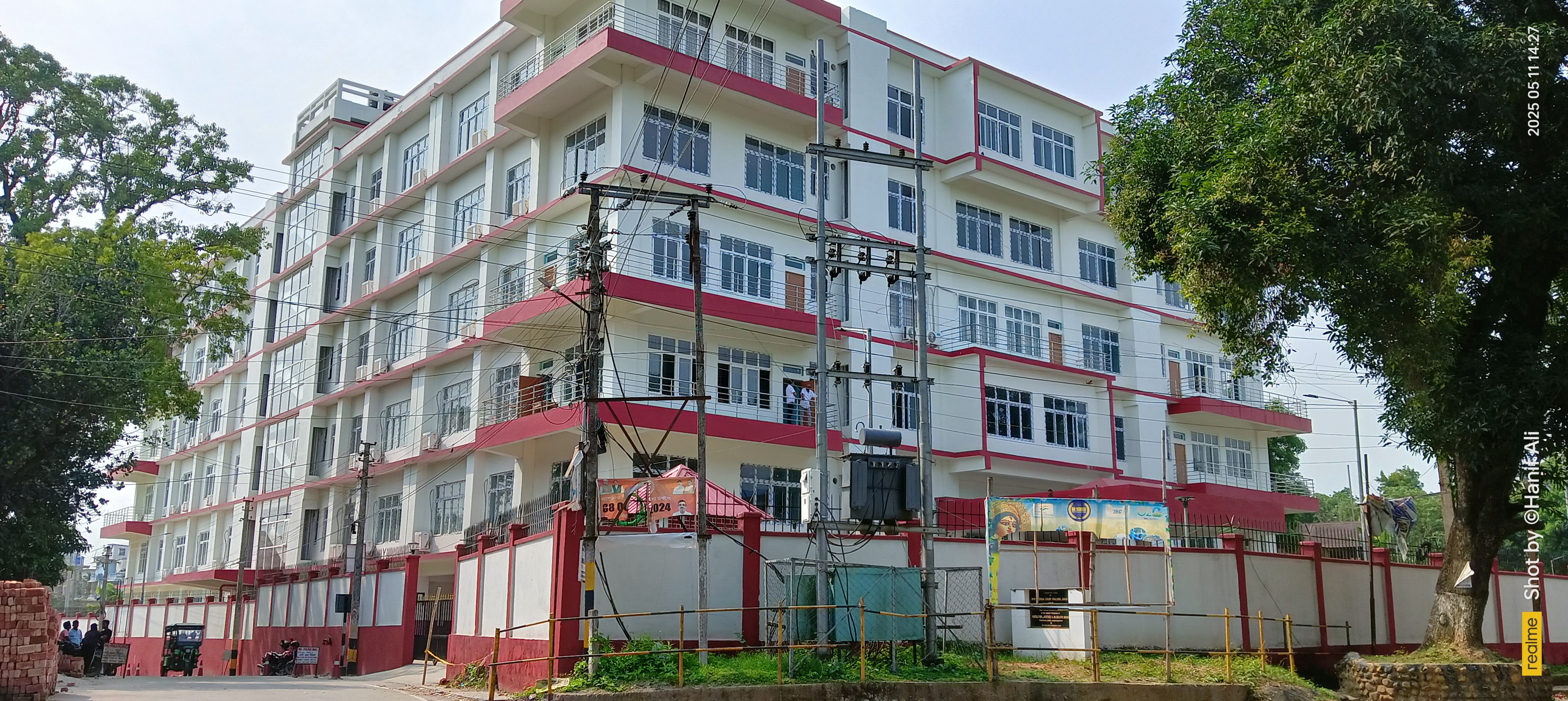
Dhubri District Court New Building

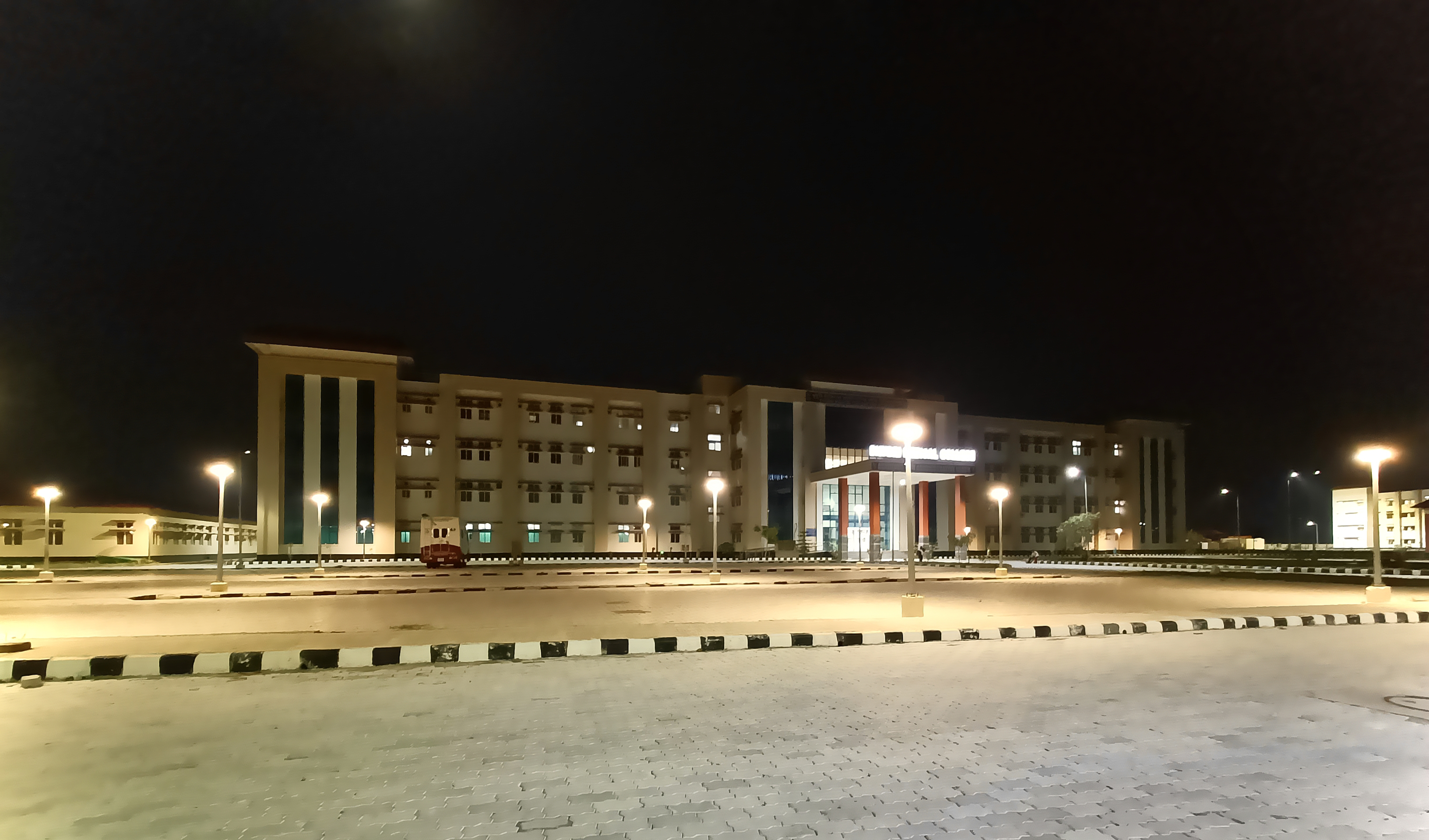
Academic Building of Dhubri Medical college & Hospital

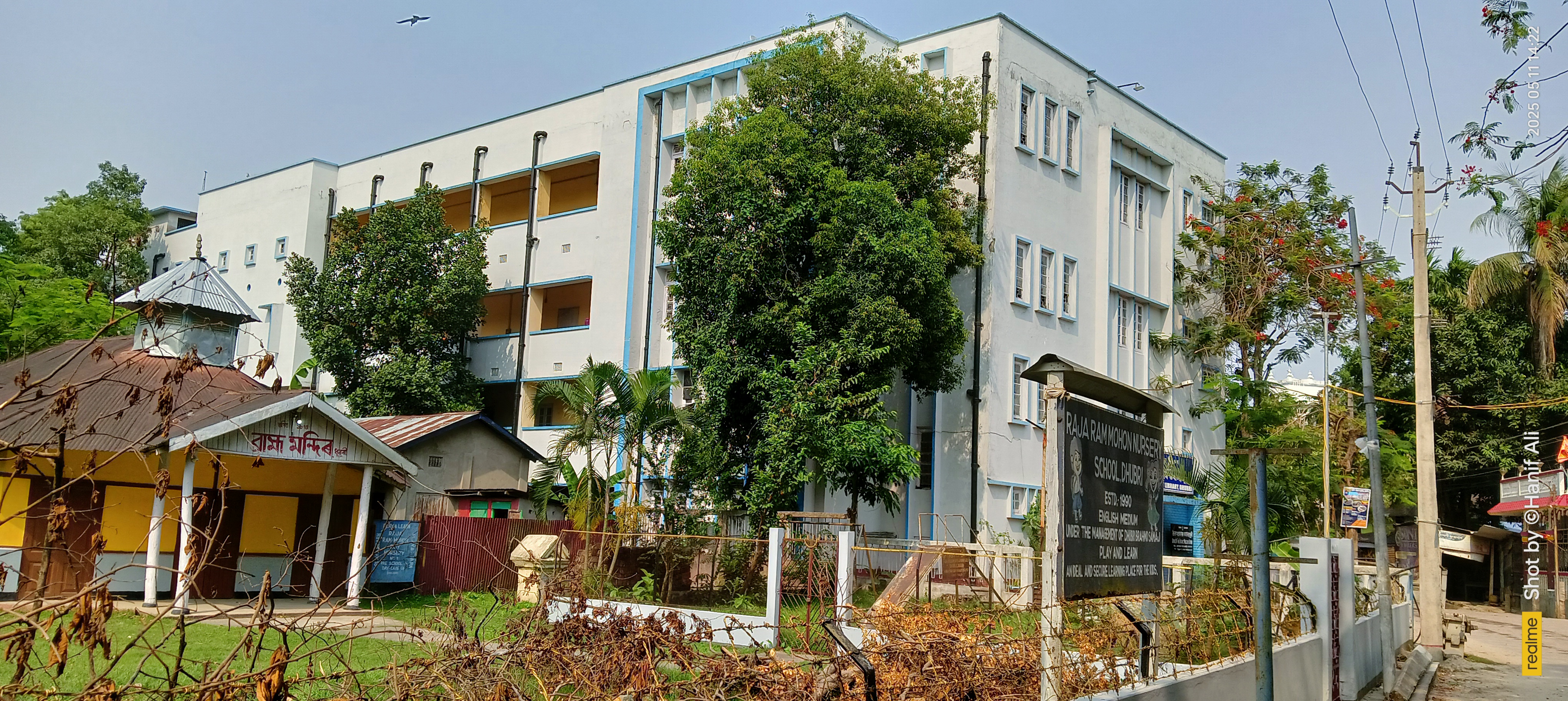
District Library Dhubri

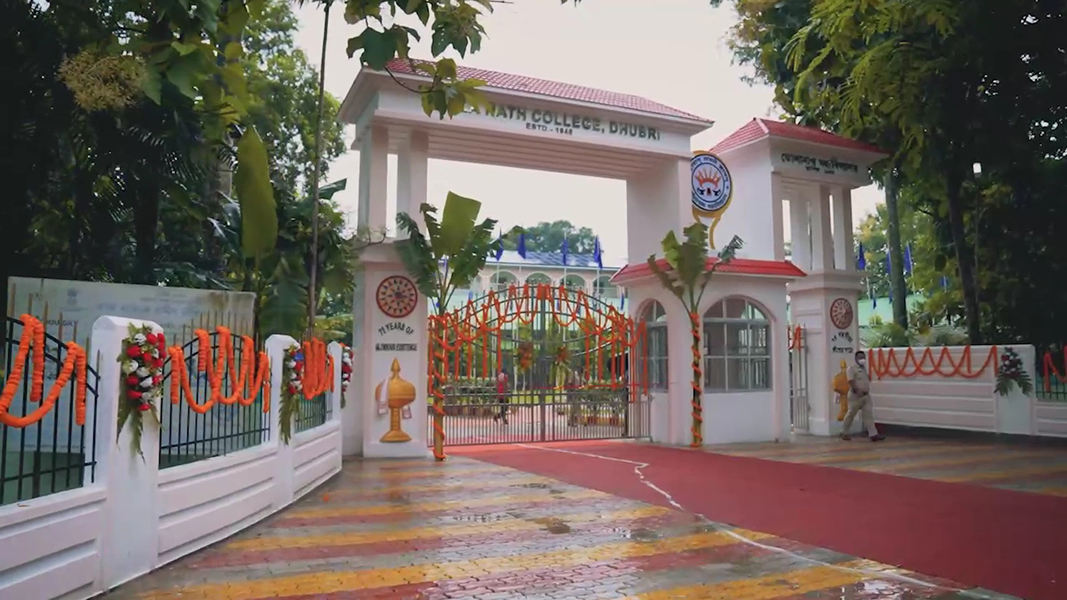
Bholanath College, Dhubri

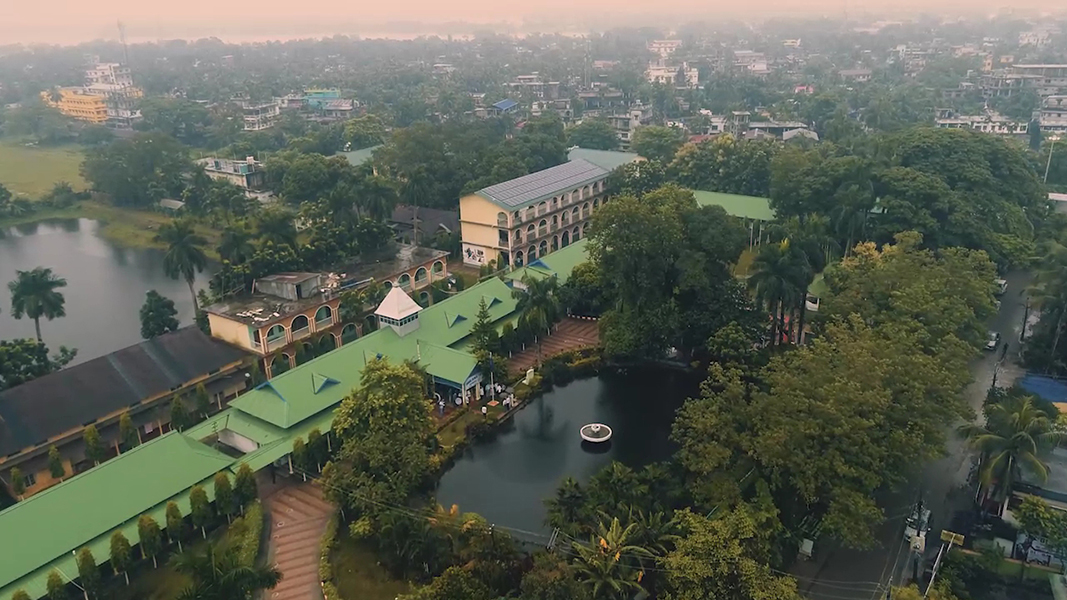
Bholanath College, Dhubri drone view 1

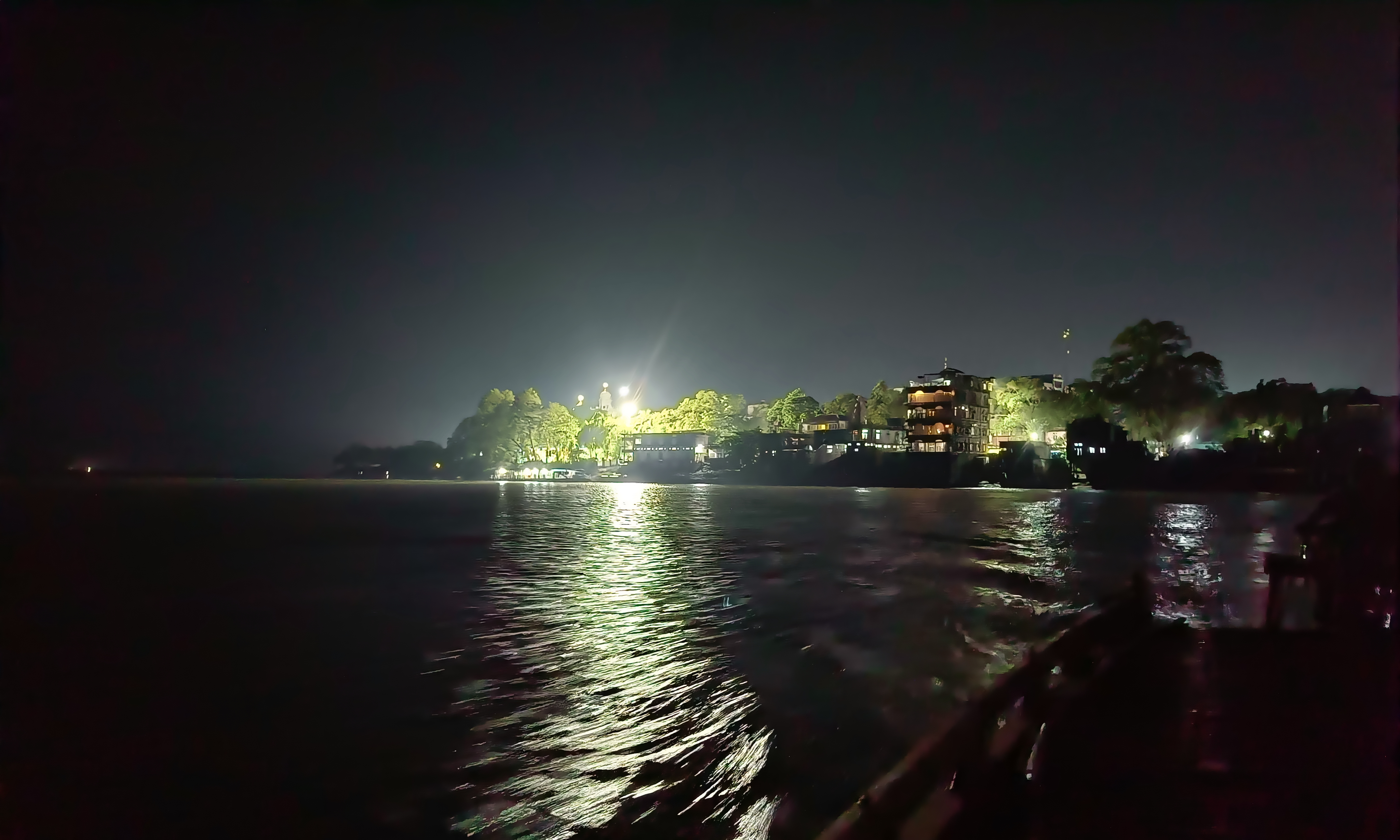
Dhubri City Night View From Brahmaputra River

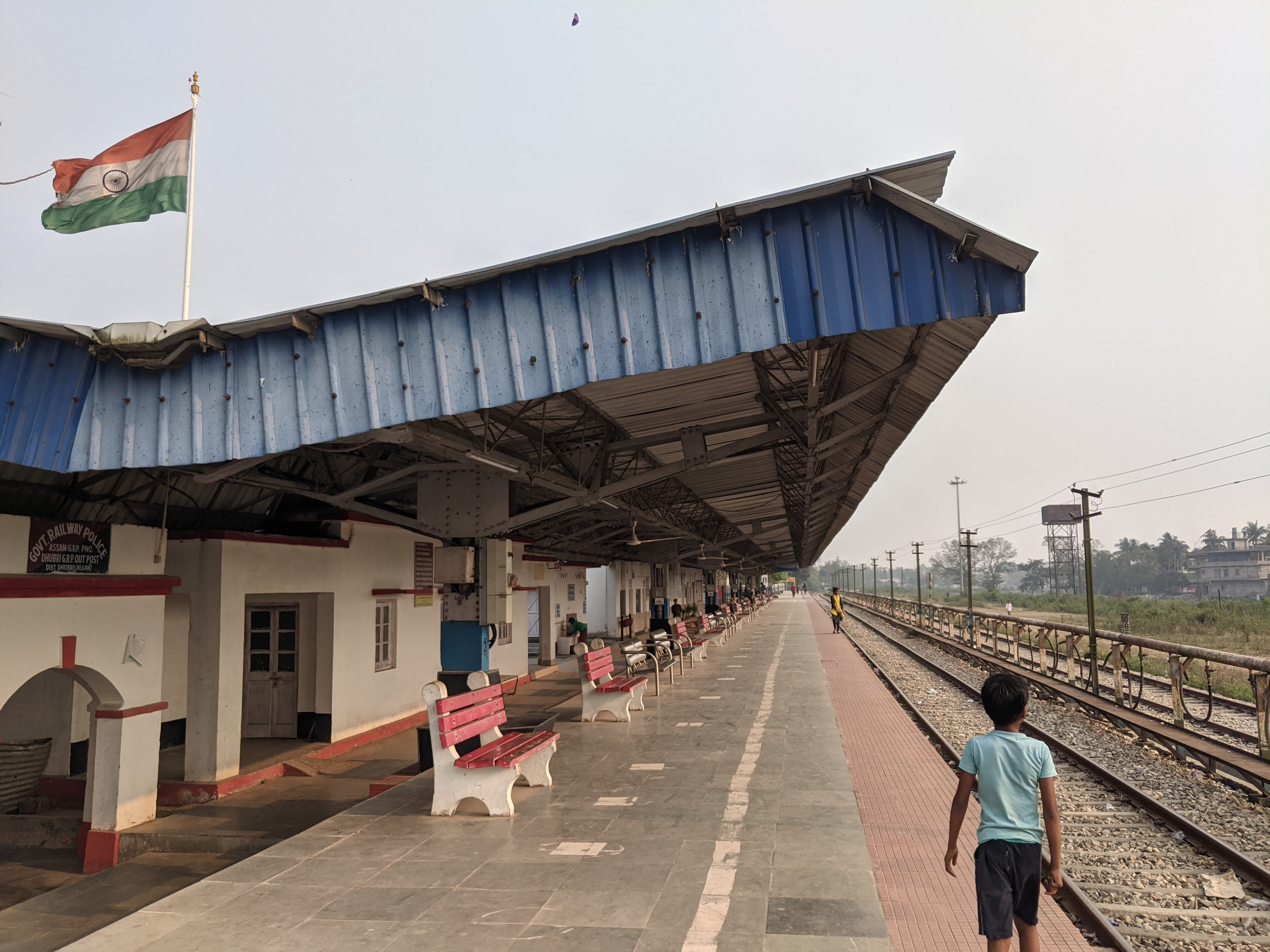
A child walking on the platform of Dhubri railway station (Indian train station in Assam) in late afternoon, with a large Indian flag flying in the background.

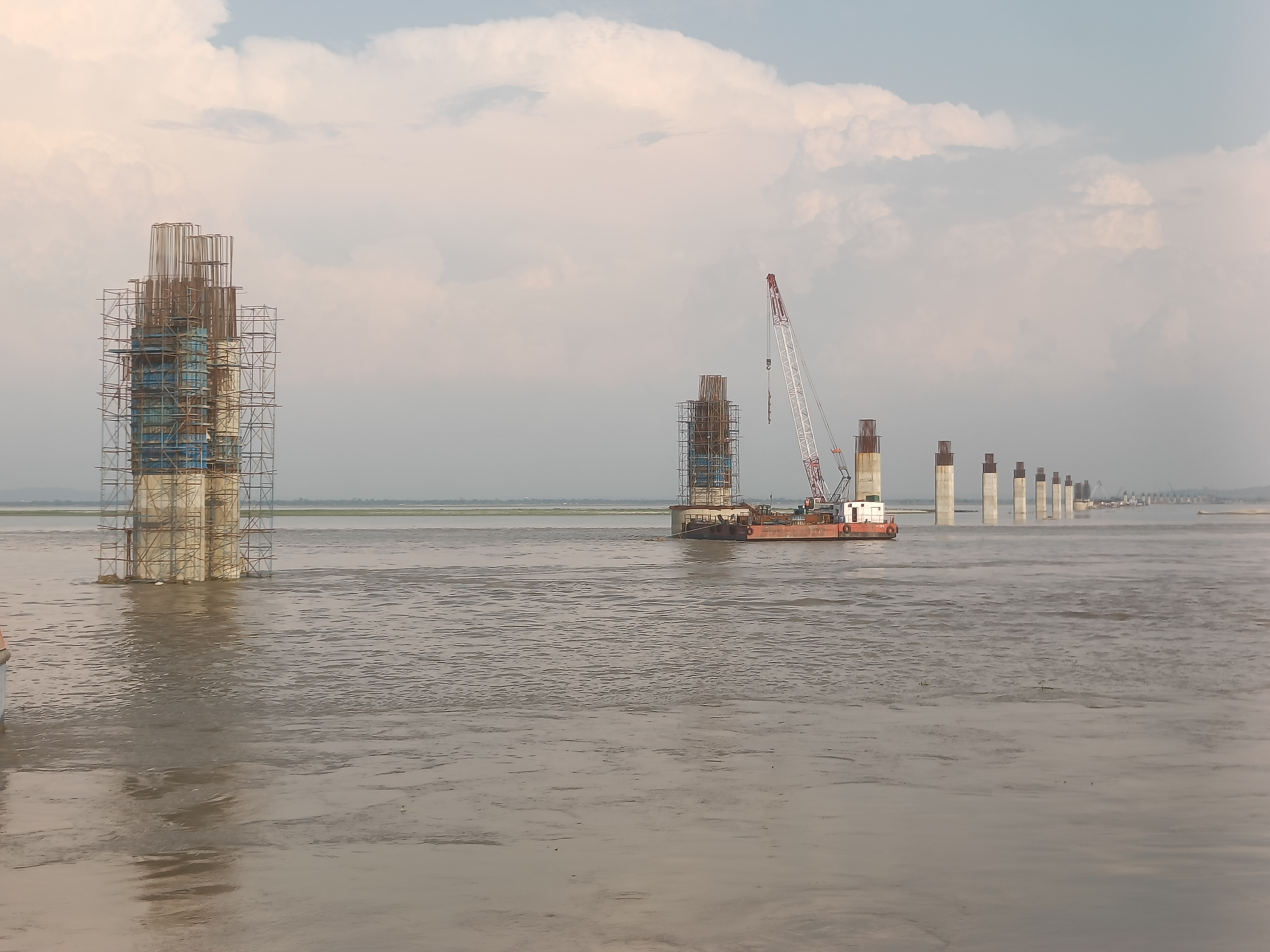
Dhubri Phulbari bridge view from pillar no.125

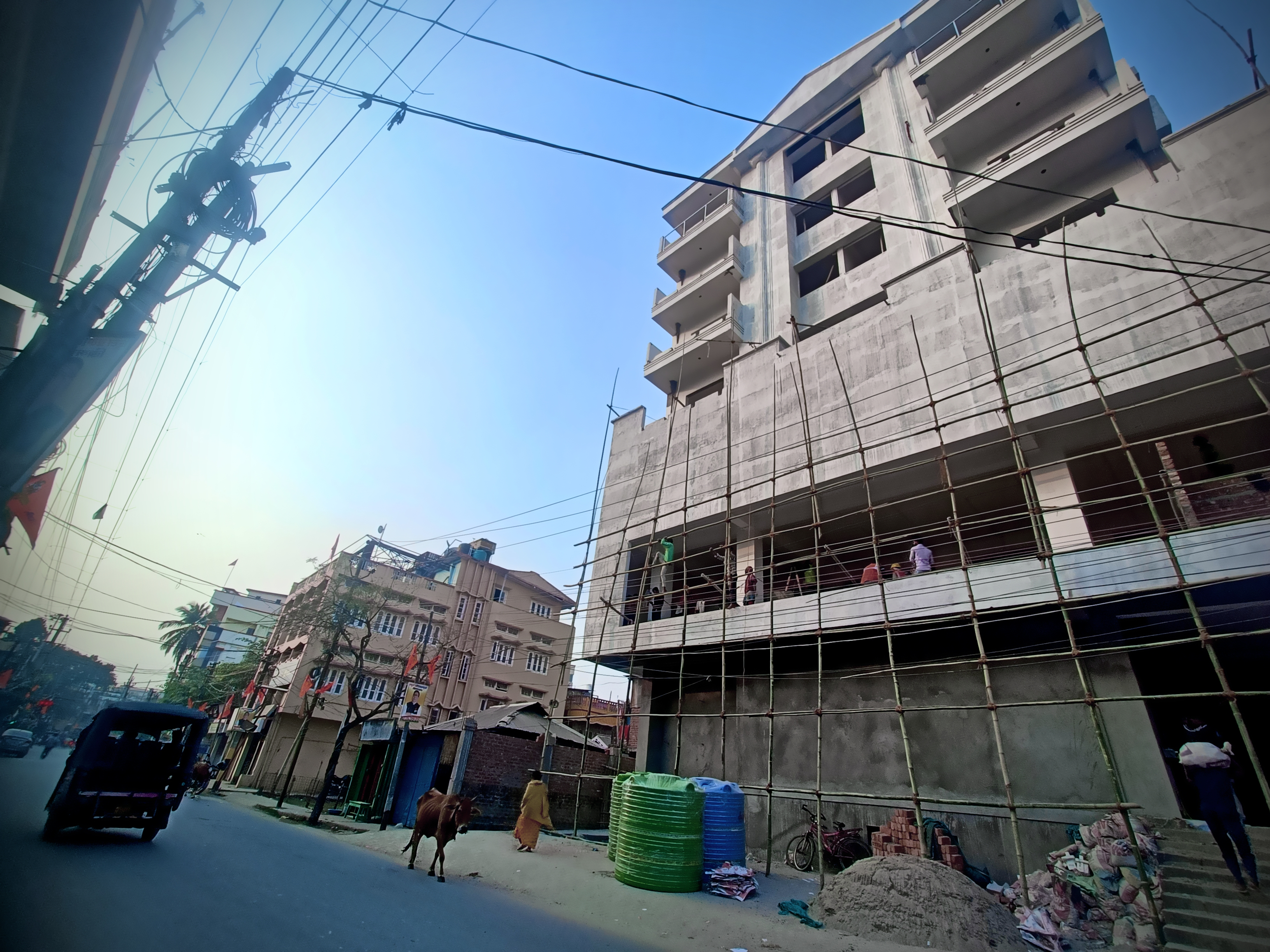
Dhubri City Street View Near Melamaidan

== See also ==
- Dhubri (Lok Sabha constituency)
- Dhubri railway station
- Rupsi Airport, Dhubri
