= Nature's Beckon =

Environmental activist group from Northeast India

- Founder: Soumyadeep Datta
- Type: Nonprofit
- Legal status: Active
- Purpose: Activism for environmental conservation
- Headquarters: Dhubri, Assam, India
- Region served: North East India
- Official language: Assamese, English, Hindi, Bengali, Bodo, Rabha, Goalparia, etc.
- Director: Soumyadeep Datta
- Website: http://naturesbeckon.org/
- Mission Statement: The mission of Nature's Beckon is working with the people to conserve, protect and increase wildlife, plants and their habitats for the continuing benefit of the people of India.

Nature's Beckon is an independent environmental activist group in Northeast India which initiated the environmental movement in Assam.

The organization was established by Ashoka Fellow Soumyadeep Datta in 1982. It aims to conserve and protect wildlife and habitats. In 1991, the organization was formally registered under the Societies Registration Act.

The organization is credited with the discovery of the golden languar (Presbytis geei) in the hill reserves of Chakrashila. It spearheaded conservation movements in Assam, such as the Chakrashila Wildlife Sanctuary Movement and the Rainforest Conservation Movement of Assam, and declared areas of habitats as protected areas, such as the Chakrashila and Dehing Patkai Wildlife Sanctuaries.

Some programs are undertaken to teach students, environmental activists, and workers about the environment and habitat.

== Formation ==
Nature's Beckon started as a nature club formed by Soumyadeep Datta in 1982. Led by him, the members went on nature-trails and bird-watching expeditions in the Dhubri Forests. Kamal Narayan Choudhury provided guidance and helped them expand their activities.

== Activities ==
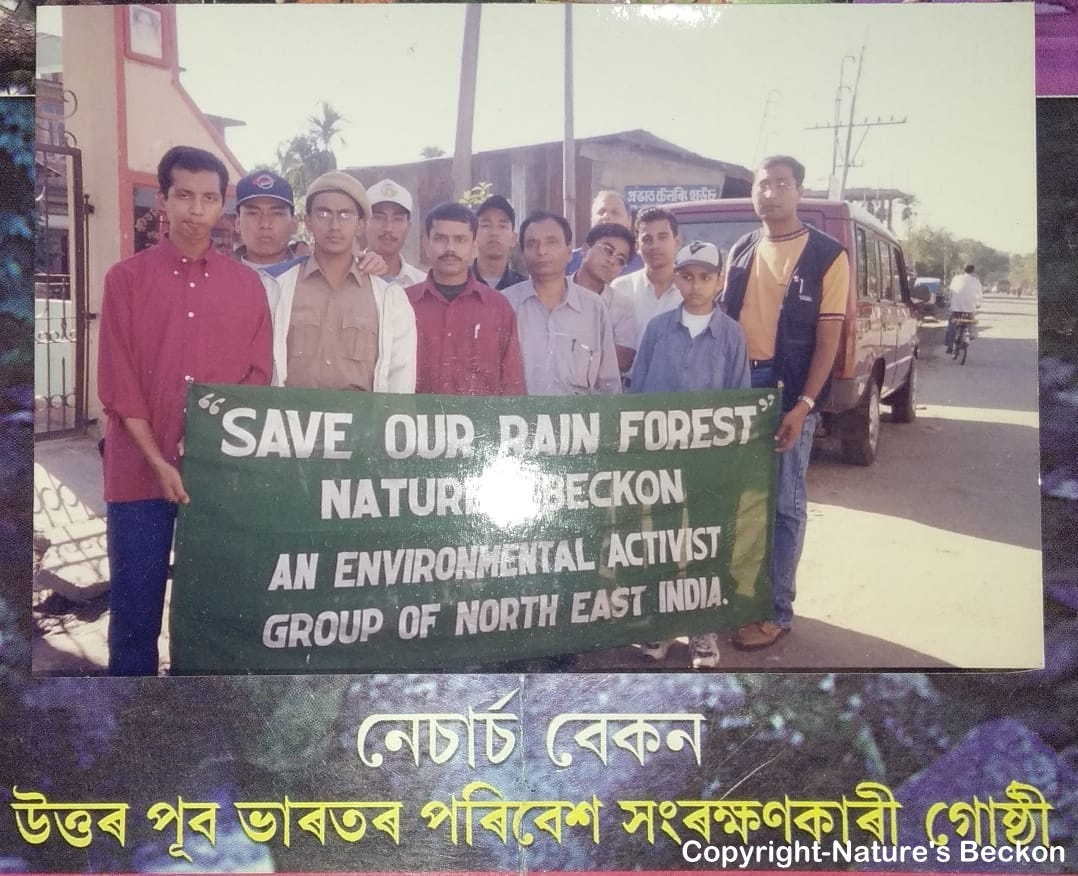
Nature's Beckon staging a street play during the rainforest conservation movement of Assam.

=== Chakrashila Wildlife Sanctuary Movement and conservation of golden languar ===
Nature's Beckon took up a 12-year-long conservation movement through people's participation in the declaration of the Chakrashila Wildlife Sanctuary.

After the discovery of golden languar in the hill reserves of Chakrashila, the organization worked for its protection through a movement at the grassroot level that involved local people, surveys and research, lobbying and other forms of activism.

=== Rainforest Conservation Movement of Assam and the declaration of Dehing Patkai Wildlife Sanctuary ===
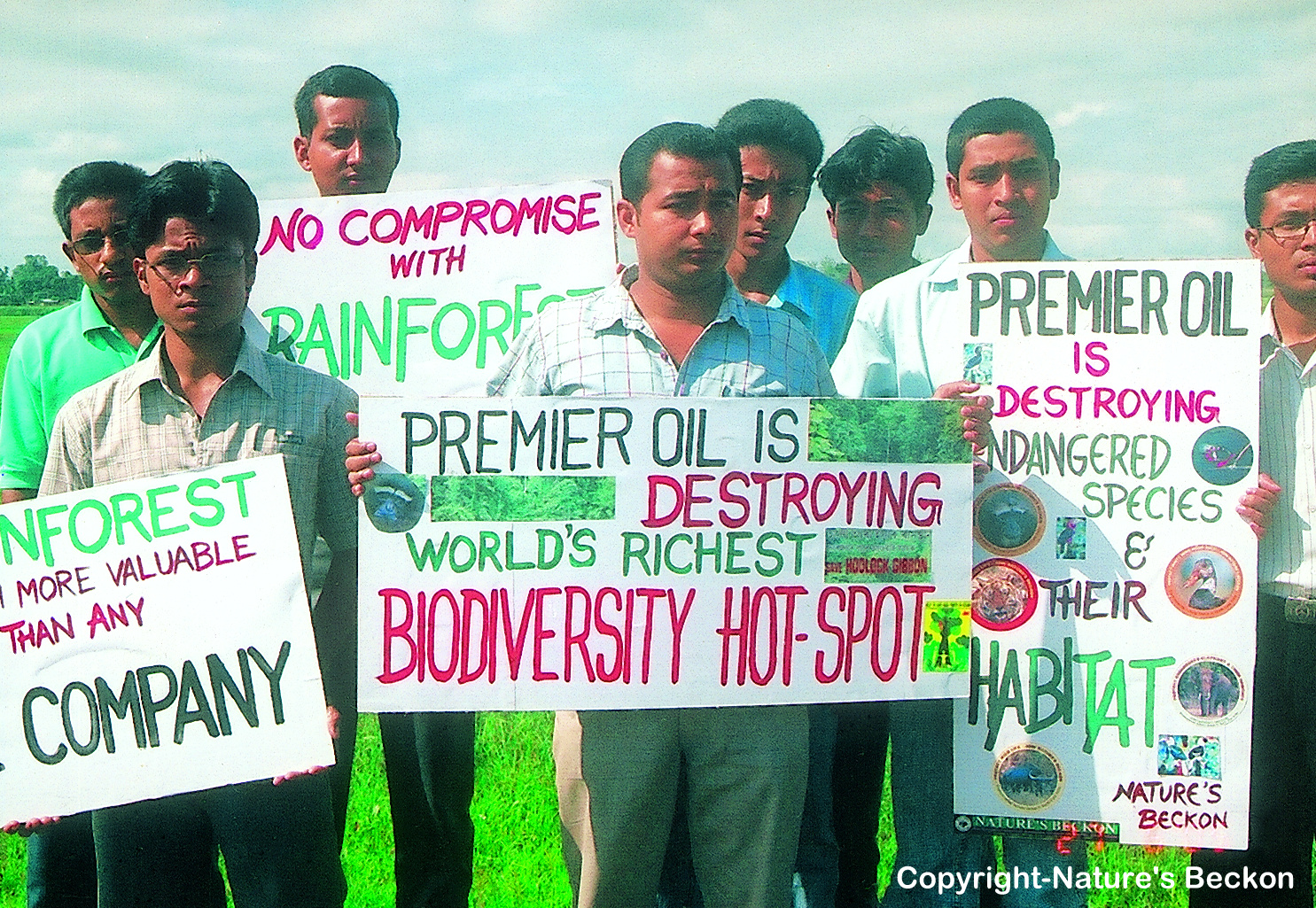
In 2003, UK based Premier Oil was permitted by the forest department to explore oil in the interior of the rainforests. It was later shut down due to the activism of Nature's Beckon.

Nature's Beckon rediscovered the presence of rain forest in the Dibrugarh-Tinsukia districts of Upper Assam and undertook a movement for the legal protection of 500 sq km of contiguous rainforest in 1995. This movement started with baseline surveys of the region by the organization. On 13 June 2004, the state government declared 111.19 sq km of rainforest as 'Dehing Patkai Wildlife Sanctuary'. The organization still demands and works for the area extension of the Dehing Patkai Wildlife Sanctuary, saying that the Dehing Patkai Wildlife Sanctuary should constitute the entire contiguous rain forest.
