= Chakrashila Wildlife Sanctuary =

Wildlife sanctuary in Assam, India

- IUCN category IV (habitat/species management area)
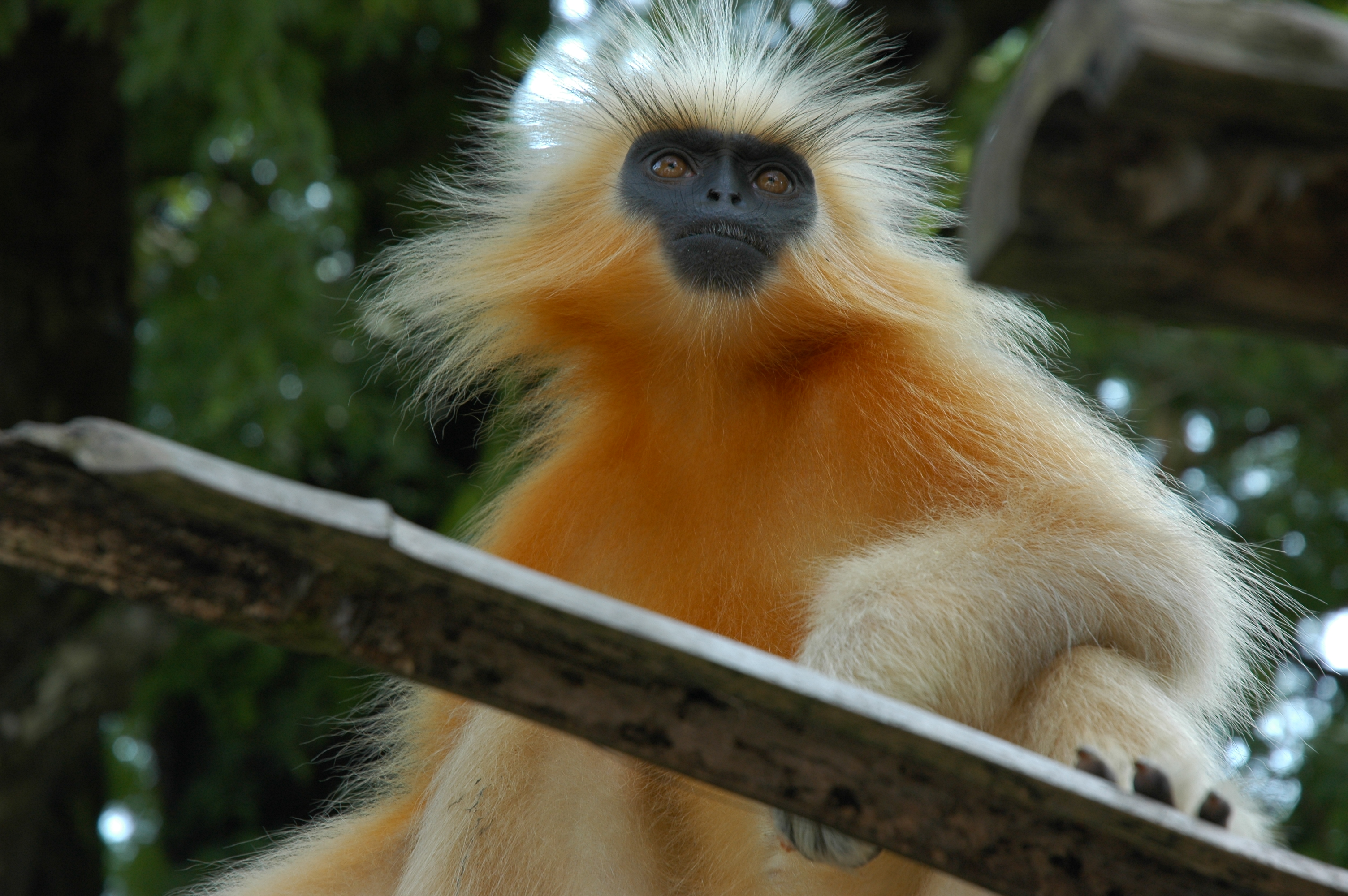
- A Golden Langur, which is found in the sanctuary

- Location within Assam Location within India
- Interactive map of Chakrashila Wildlife Sanctuary
- Location: Kokrajhar and Dhubri district
- Nearest city: Kokrajhar
- Coordinates: 26.338°N 90.329°E
- Area: 45.568 square kilometres (17.594 sq mi)
- Established: 1966; 60 years ago
- World Heritage site: no

Chakrashila Wildlife Sanctuary originally Sikhri-Sikhla Wildlife Sanctuary is a wildlife sanctuary falling under Kokrajhar district and some adjacent areas of Dhubri district of Assam, India. It is famous for the golden langur and is the second protected habitat for golden langurs in India.

== History ==
Sikhri-Sikhla Hill was first declared as a reserve forest in 1966 and on 14 July 1994, it was recognized with the status of sanctuary by the Government of Assam. A local environmental activist group, Nature's Beckon, played a vital role in this recognition.

== Location ==
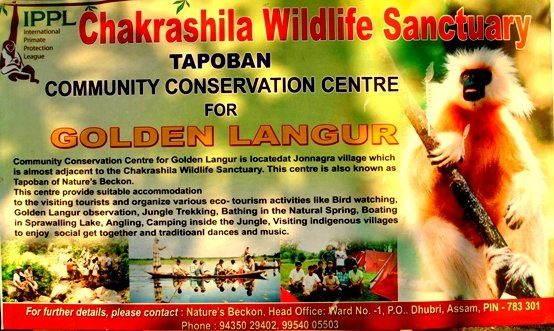
Conservation drive for golden langur by Nature's Beckon

The sanctuary covers an area of 45.568 km^{2} (4556.8 hectares). It is around 6 km from Kokrajhar town, 68 km from Dhubri town and 219 km from Lokpriya Gopinath Bordoloi International Airport, Guwahati. The sanctuary is mainly a hilly tract running north–south and there are two lakes (Dheer Beel and Diplai Beel) on either side, which are integral to the eco-system of the sanctuary. The lower hilly reaches are covered with sal coppice regeneration while middle and upper reaches are covered with mixed deciduous forests. The sanctuary has some tourist accommodation facility at Choraikhola, Kokrajhar and also provides facilities for bird watching, forest trekking, and wildlife and nature photography

Notable animals at the sanctuary

Different kinds of mammals and birds, twenty-three species of reptiles including snakes, lizards and turtles, more than forty species of butterfly are found in this sanctuary. Some species of mammals recorded in this sanctuary are Indian short-tailed mole, Indian flying fox, short nosed fruit bat, Indian false vampire, Indian pipistrelle, rhesus macaque, Chinese pangolin, Asiatic jackal and Bengal fox. Hornbills are also spotted here. It is also a safe haven for a variety of endangered animals.

=== Birds ===
A total of 119 species of birds have been recorded in the Chakrashila Wildlife Sanctuary. This number includes three globally threatened species. Some of the species recorded here include black francolin (Francolinus francolinus), jungle bush quail (Perdicula asiatica), lesser whistling duck, cinnamon bittern, Indian pond heron, cattle egret, purple heron, red-necked falcon, red-headed vulture, greater spotted eagle, and bronze-winged jacana.

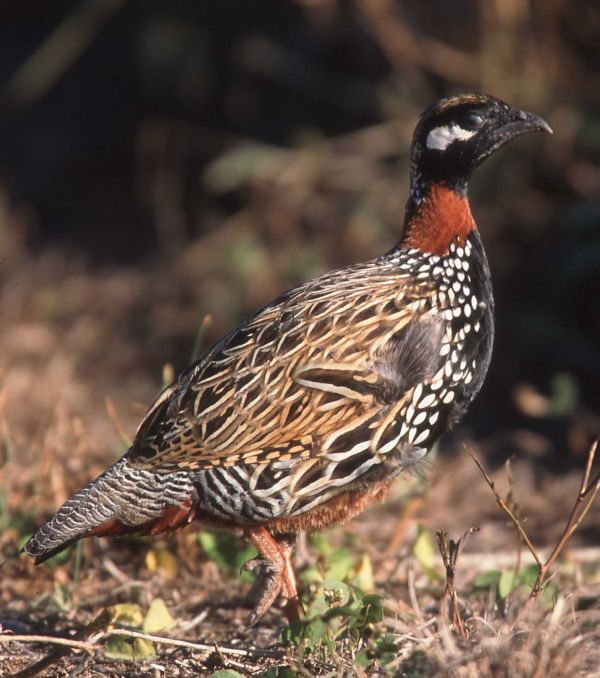
Black francolin

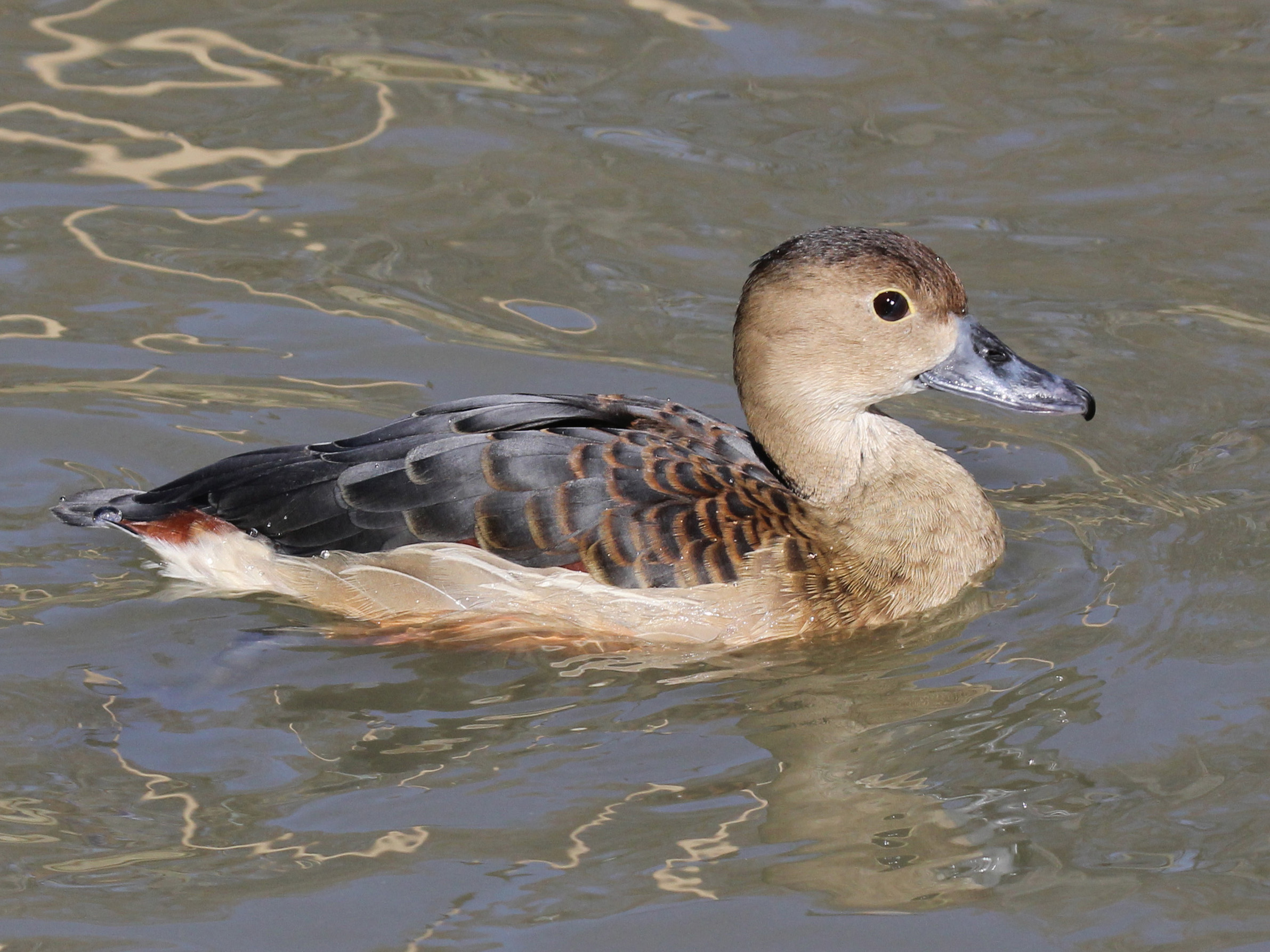
Lesser whistling duck

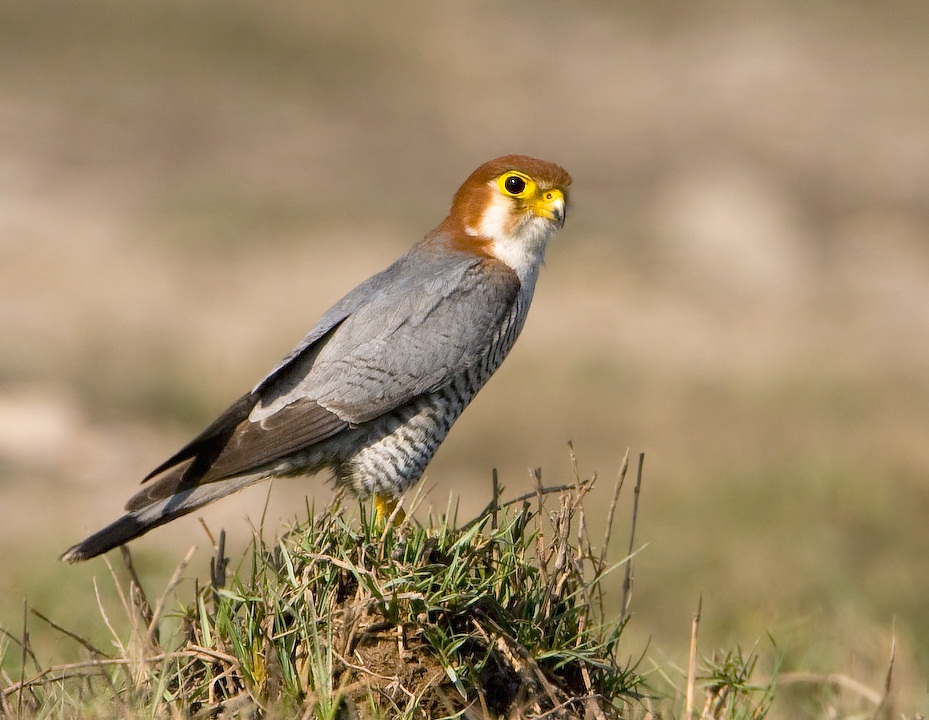
The red-necked falcon
