= Mountain railways of India =

Mountain Railways of India
UNESCO World Heritage Site
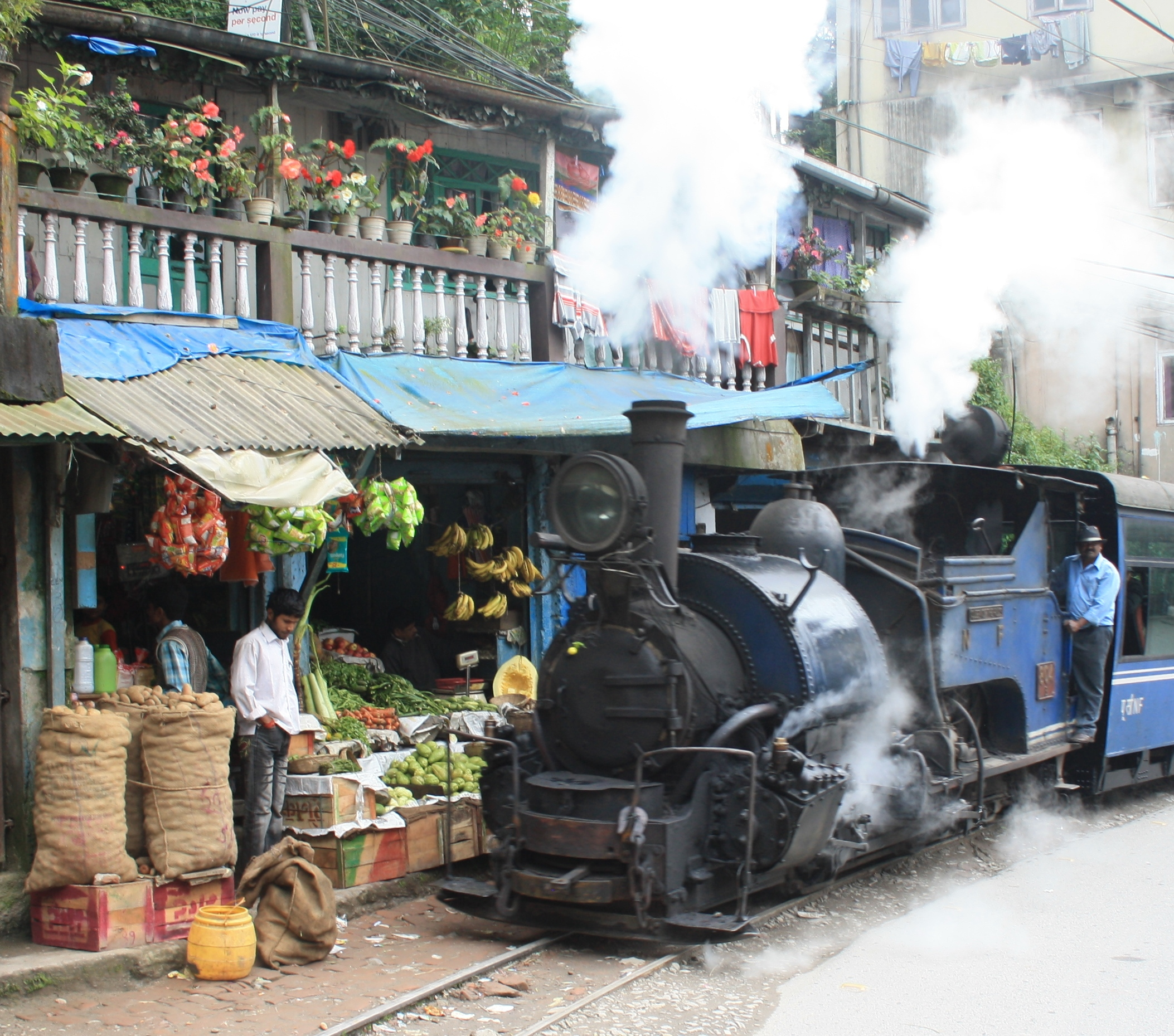
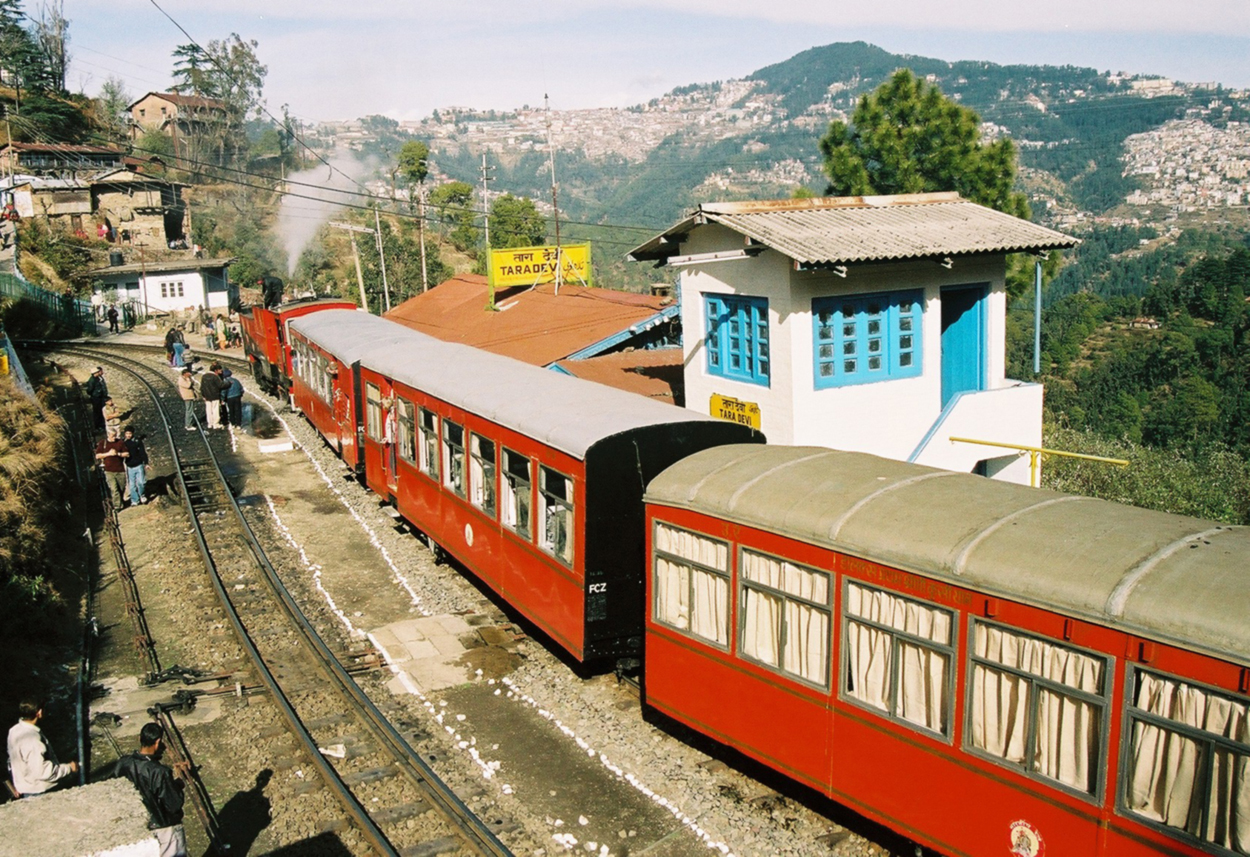
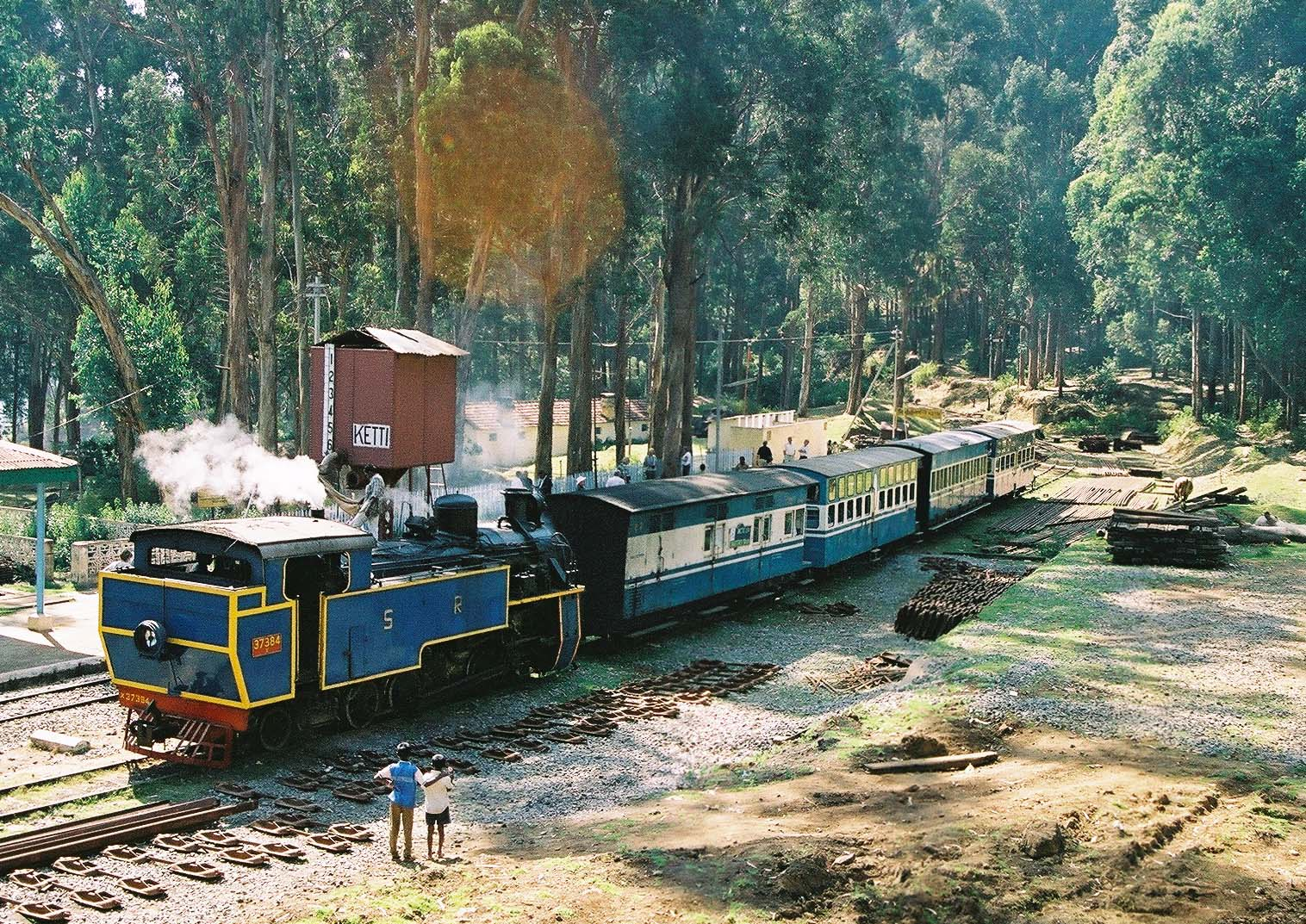
- Mountain Railways of India Darjeeling Kalka-Shimla Nilgiri
- Location: India
- Includes: Darjeeling Himalayan Railway; Nilgiri Mountain Railway; Kalka–Shimla Railway
- Criteria: Cultural: (ii), (iv)
- Reference: 944
- Inscription: 1999 (23rd Session)
- Extensions: 2005, 2008
- Area: 88.99 ha (219.9 acres)
- Buffer zone: 644.88 ha (1,593.5 acres)
- Mountain railways of India

The Mountain railways of India refer to railway lines operating in the mountainous regions of India. These include narrow-gauge railways that connect to select hill stations, and some of the broad-gauge lines running across mountainous terrain.

Three of the lines, the Darjeeling Himalayan Railway, the Nilgiri Mountain Railway, and the Kalka–Shimla Railway, are collectively designated as a UNESCO World Heritage Site under the name "Mountain Railways of India". Two more narrow-gauge lines, the Matheran Hill Railway and the Kangra Valley Railway, are on the tentative list of UNESCO World Heritage Sites. The Nilgiri Mountain Railway is the only rack and pinion railway in India.

The Jammu–Baramulla line, completed in 2025, uses broad-gauge. Other broad-gauge mountain railways, such as the Chota Char Dham Railway, Bhanupli–Leh line and Sivok–Rangpo line are currently under construction, and others are in the planning stage.

== World Heritage Site ==
Three railways, the Darjeeling Himalayan Railway, the Nilgiri Mountain Railway and the Kalka–Shimla Railway are collectively designated as a World Heritage Site by UNESCO, under the name 'Mountain Railways of India'. The Matheran Hill Railway and Kangra Valley Railway are on the tentative list of UNESCO World Heritage Sites. UNESCO describes the Mountain Railways of India as "outstanding examples of bold, ingenious engineering solutions for the problem of establishing an effective rail link through rugged, mountainous terrain." The Darjeeling Himalayan Railway received the honor first in 1999 followed by the Nilgiri Mountain Railway in 2005, and the Kalka–Shimla Railway was added in 2008. The three routes are part of the UNESCO World Heritage Site criteria ii and iv, within the Asia-Pacific region.

== Railway lines ==
=== Darjeeling Himalayan Railway ===
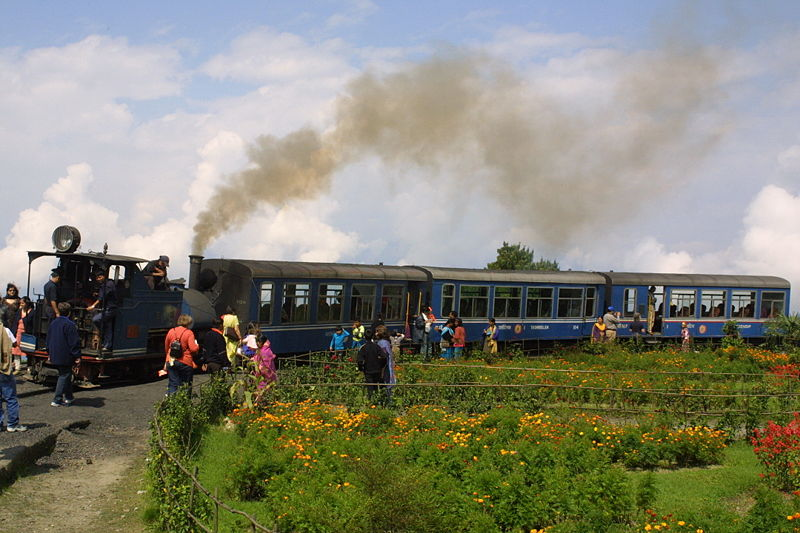
A train on the Darjeeling Himalayan Railway

The Darjeeling Himalayan Railway is a 610 mm (24 in) narrow-gauge railway that links the 88.48 km (54.98 mi) route between New Jalpaiguri and Darjeeling. The latter is a major hill station and the centre of a tea-growing district in East India. The town of Siliguri, at the start of the railway route, was connected with Calcutta via railway in 1878, while the additional journey to Darjeeling required the use of tongas (horse-driven carts) along a dust track. On the recommendations of a committee appointed by Ashley Eden, work on the route began in 1879. The line opened in phases and was completed by July 1881. Initially, small four wheel carriages were used, which was replaced by bogie carriages later. The line underwent several improvements such as making its gradients more gradual over the years to increase its manoeuvrability.

The route is operated by the Northeast Frontier Railway of the Indian Railways. The line starts at near sea level at Siliguri and raises to over 2,100 m (7,000 ft) at Darjeeling. The highest elevation is at Ghoom station, 2,258 m (7,408 ft). The line has steep gradients and several sharp curves along the route. The line originally had bankings of gradient ranging from 1 in 19 to 1 in 36 with sharp curves of 50 ft (15 m) radius. However, over the years, the line was modified, with the steepest gradient now being 1 in 23, and the sharpest curve having a turning radius of 69 ft (21 m). The track features four zigzags and four loops. The train is pulled by steam locomotives, and moves at speeds of between 20–25 km/h (12–16 mph). Although the service was begun in the 19th century to move humans and freight efficiently, its primary clients today are tourists. The railway is notable for its signage located at key vantage points, marking locations with titles such as Agony Point and Sensation Corner. The spirals on steep hills that provide scenic views of the valleys below.

=== Nilgiri Mountain Railway ===
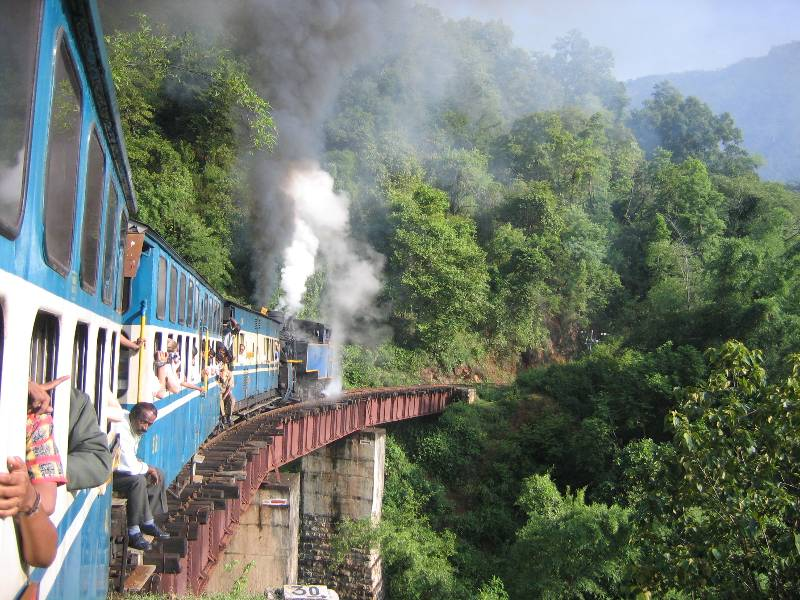
A train on the Nilgiri Mountain Railway

The Nilgiri Mountain Railway is a 45.88 km (28.51 mi) metre gauge single-line railway. It connects the town of Mettupalayam with the hill station of Udagamandalam (Ooty) in the state of Tamil Nadu. It traverses through the Nilgiri Hills of Southern India ascending from an elevation of 326 m (1,070 ft) to 2,203 m (7,228 ft). Before the line was laid, travel was slow and arduous with bullock carts, and horses used for travel. Plans for the railway line was first made in 1854, however, the line was completed only in June 1899. The line was initially laid till Coonoor, and was extended to Ooty in October 1908. It was initially operated by the Madras Railway, which later became part of the South Indian Railway Company. It is currently been operated by the Southern Railway zone of the Indian Railways.

It is the only rack railway in India, and it uses an Abt rack system, which requires the use of special steam locomotives. The line runs for 7.2 km (4.5 mi), up to the station of Kallar, where the rack rail portion begins. The rack rail portion ends at Coonoor railway station. In addition to the traction by adhesion as in an ordinary loco, additional traction is generated by pinions acting on the track bars in the segment. There are four brakes including two hand brakes, and two air brakes, and the former are used for shunting while the latter for descending steep gradients. One of the handbrakes acts on the tyres of the wheels in the ordinary manner and the second acts on grooved surfaces of the pinion axle, but can be used in those places where the rack is laid. The line has an average gradient of 1 in 24.5, with the steepest at 1 in 23, and is one of the steepest mountain railway in Asia. The line includes 250 bridges, 15 road over bridges, and 16 tunnels. The longest tunnel of this section measures 97 m (318 ft). The uphill journey along the route to take about 290 min (4.8 h), while the downhill journey takes 215 min (3.6 h). The line is prone to disruptions, as the region experiences heavy rainfall during the monsoon.

=== Kalka–Shimla Railway ===
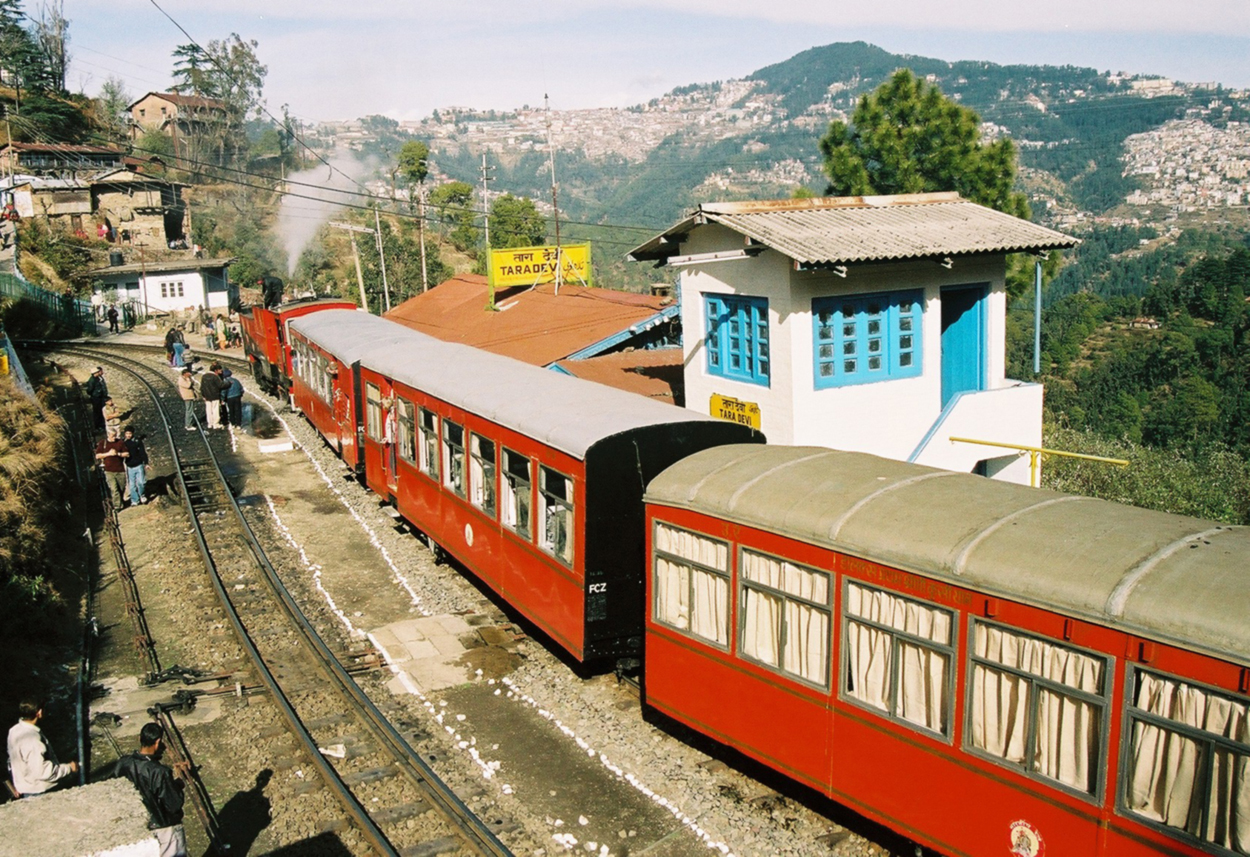
Shivalik Deluxe Express on the Kalka–Shimla Railway

The Kalka–Shimla Railway is a narrow 2 ft 6 in (762 mm) railway that runs 96.6 km (60.0 mi) between Kalka and Shimla in Himachal Pradesh. It ascends from an elevation of 656 m (2,152 ft) to 2,076 m (6,811 ft) in the Siwalik Hills of the Himalayas. Until the railway's construction, the only access to Shimla was by village cartway. The railway line was constructed by the Delhi–Ambala–Kalka Railway Company, beginning in 1898 and was completed in 1903. It is administered by the Northern Railways of the Indian Railways.

The Kalka–Shimla Railway has 103 tunnels and 864 bridges. Many of the bridges are multi-arched, similar to Ancient Roman aqueducts, and one bridge, which spans 18.29 m (60.0 ft), is made with plate girders and steel trusses. Its ruling gradient is 1 in 33, and it features 919 curves, with the sharpest at 48 degrees (radius of 37.47 m (122.9 ft)). The longest tunnel on the line is the Barog Tunnel (No. 33), which is 1,144 m (3,753 ft) long, between Barog and Solan. There are loops at Taksal, Gumman, and Dharampur which help to attain the require gradient.

=== Matheran Hill Railway ===
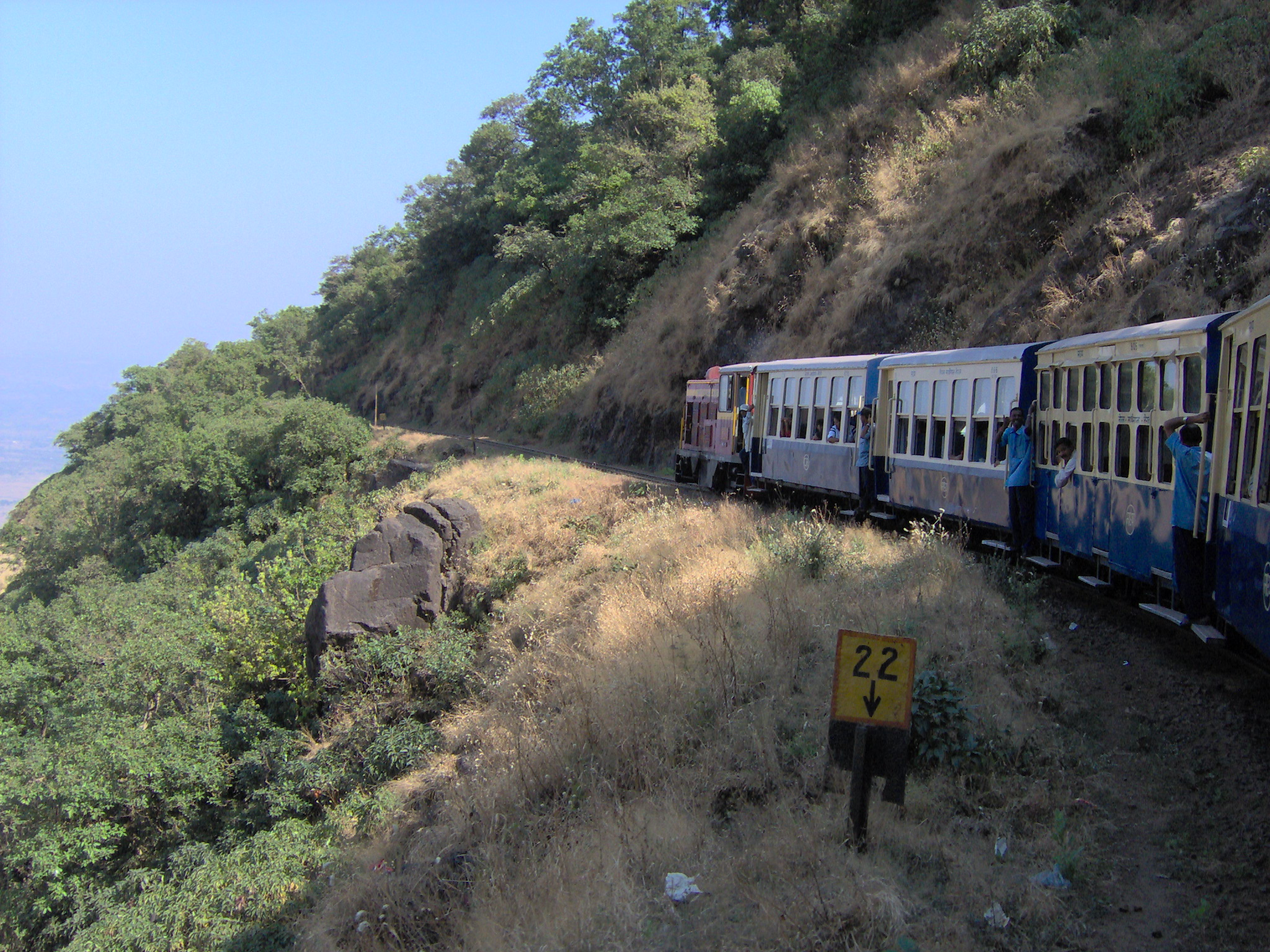
A train on the Matheran Hill Railway

The Matheran Hill Railway is a 2 ft (610 mm) narrow-gauge railway that covers a distance of 19.97 km (12.41 mi) between Neral and Matheran, in Maharashtra. Located in the Western Ghats, its construction was led by Abdul Peerbhoy and financed by his father, Adamjee Peerbhoy, of the Adamjee Group. The project was designed in 1900, with construction beginning in 1904 and completed in March 1907. The original tracks were built using 30 lb/yd rails but were later updated to 42 lb/yd rails. Until the 1980s, the railway was closed during the monsoon season (because of the increased risk of landslides) but is now open all year. It is administered by the Central Railways of the Indian Railways.

The railway line ascends at an average gradient of 1 in 25, with a maximum gradient of 1 in 20. It has 221 curves with the sharpest having a radius of 18.25 m (59.9 ft). There are 121 bridges, and a single tunnel (One kiss tunnel) on the line. The maximum speed is 20 km/h (12 mph), which is reduced to as low as 8 km/h (5.0 mph) at sharp curves. Notable features of the line include its horseshoe embankments, the Herdal Hill section, the steep grade of Bhekra Khud, and the two zigzags at Mountain Berry.

=== Kangra Valley Railway ===
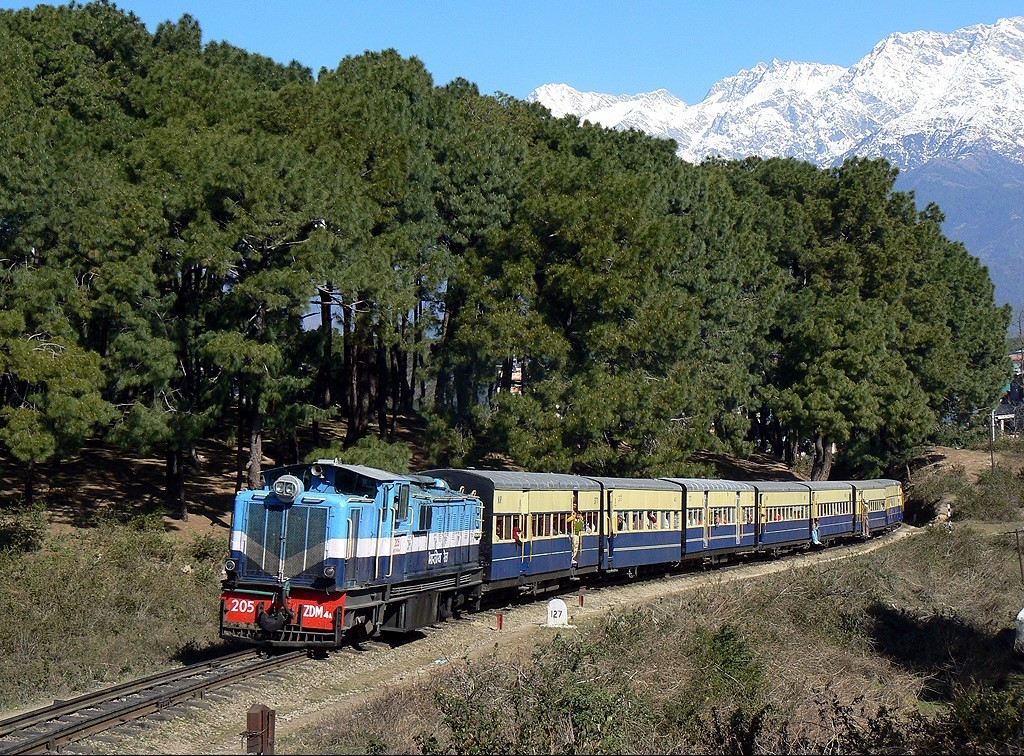
A train on the Kangra Valley Railway

The Kangra Valley Railway is 2 ft 6 in (762 mm) narrow-gauge railway and covers a distance of 163.72 km (101.73 mi) between Pathankot in Punjab and Joginder Nagar in Himachal Pradesh in the sub-Himalayan region. The highest point on this line is at Ahju station at an elevation of 1,291 m (4,236 ft)}. The construction of the line began in 1925, primarily to support a hydroelectric project. It opened for freight traffic on 1 December 1928, and later for passenger traffic from April 1929. The service faced disruptions during the Second World War and the construction of Pong Dam in the 1970s, but was restored later.

The line has a maximum gradient of 1 in 25, and features 993 bridges, two tunnels, and 484 curves, with the sharpest curve having a radius of 58.33 m (191.4 ft). Major bridge structures include the steel arch bridge over the Reond nalah and the girder bridge over the Banganga River. The train initially operated with steam locomotives, but now uses diesel locomotives. The train travels at a maximum speed of 45 km/h (28 mph) in the flatter sections, and 20 km (12 mi) in the steep hill sections. The line is part of the Northern Railway.

=== Jammu–Baramulla line ===
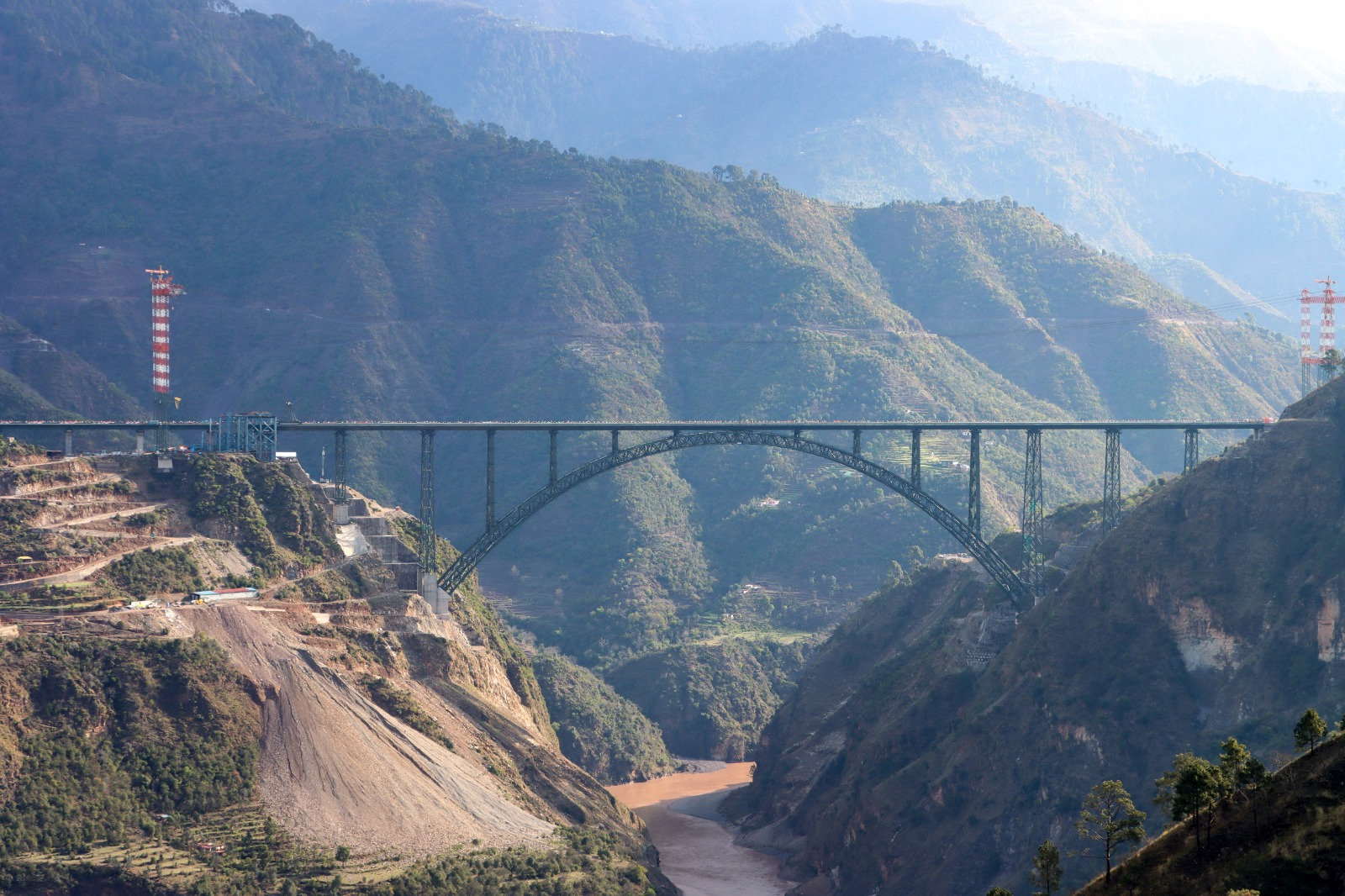
Chenab Rail Bridge on the Jammu-Baramulla line

The 325 km (202 mi)-long Jammu–Baramulla line is an broad gauge railway line that connects the Kashmir Valley with Jammu in Jammu and Kashmir. The railway starts from Jammu Tawi and connects to Baramulla via Srinagar. The line passes through the Pir Panjal range of the Himalayas, which necessitated multiple tunnels and bridges. The line includes the Chenab Rail Bridge, the highest rail bridge in the world,

the Anji Khad Bridge, India's first cable-stayed railway bridge, and the Pir Panjal Railway Tunnel, India's longest railway tunnel. The Jammu–Udhampur section of the line was opened in April 2005. Subsequently, the section between Banihal and Baramulla was opened in phases from 2008 to 2013. The section between Udhampur and Katra was opened for traffic in July 2014. The entire line was completed in June 2025.

=== Patalpani–Kalakund line ===
Patalpani–Kalakund line is a metre-gauge line in Madhya Pradesh. The 9.5 km (5.9 mi) section is maintained by the Western Railways, and was part of the Mhow–Khandwa line. The line has a 1 to 40 gradient, and 42 bridges. It was declared a heritage track by the Indian Railways on 25 December 2018, and a new alignment is being constructed to Mhow–Khandwa line to bypass the line for regular railway traffic.

=== Bilimora–Waghai Line ===
Bilimora–Waghai line is a 63 km (39 mi) line in Gujarat. It was opened in 1914, and later became part of the Western Railway. It was slated for closure in 2020 but was reopened and designated as a heritage train service in 2021.

== Proposed lines ==
The Srinagar–Leh line is a proposed railway line to run from Srinagar in the Kashmir valley to Leh in the Ladakh region via Kargil. The line was designated a national project in February 2013. The Bhanupli–Leh line is a proposed railway line that is planned to connect Bhanupli in Punjab to Leh. If undertaken, the line would be the highest railway line in the world.

The Chota Char Dham Railway consists of two Y-shaped railways, comprising several individual rail lines: the Doiwala–Dehradun–Uttarkashi–Maneri Gangotri Railway, a 131 km (81 mi) route joined by the Uttarkashi–Palar Yamunotri Railway, a 22 km (14 mi) route with the "Y" fork connection at Uttarkashi; the Karnaprayag–Saikot–Sonprayag Kedarnath Railway, a 99 km (62 mi) route joined by the Saikot–Joshimath Badrinath Railway, a 75 km (47 mi) route with the "Y" fork connection at Saikot. The Rishikesh–Karnaprayag Railway, under construction, is an extension from the existing Rishikesh railway station to Karnaprayag of the above system.

The Sivok–Rangpo line is a proposed railway line planned to connect the towns of Sevoke in West Bengal and Rangpo in Sikkim. The railway line will connect Sikkim with the Indian Railway network, and is planned to be extended to Gangtok and possibly the India-China border.

== See also ==
- Future of rail transport in India
- Mountain railway
