= Future of rail transport in India =

Overview of Indian programme to upgrade railways

The Indian Government is undertaking several initiatives to upgrade its railway infrastructure and enhance its quality of service. The Railway Ministry has announced plans to invest ₹540,000 crore (equivalent to ₹6.2 trillion or US$67 billion in 2026) to upgrade the railways by 2030. Upgrades include 100% electrification of railways, upgrading existing lines with more facilities and higher speeds, expansion of new lines, upgrading railway stations, introducing and eventually developing a large high-speed train network interconnecting major cities in different parts of India and development of various dedicated freight corridors to cut down cargo costs within the country.

The Research Design and Standards Organisation (RDSO) is undertaking all research, designs and standardisation work for modernisation, National High Speed Rail Corporation Limited (NHSRCL) is overlooking the implementation of high-speed train programs across the country, Dedicated Freight Corridor Corporation of India (DFCCI) is the agency undertaking development of freight corridors around the country and Indian Railway Stations Development Corporation (IRSDC) is engaged in railway stations upgrade and development programs.

== Trains ==
=== Semi-high-speed rail ===
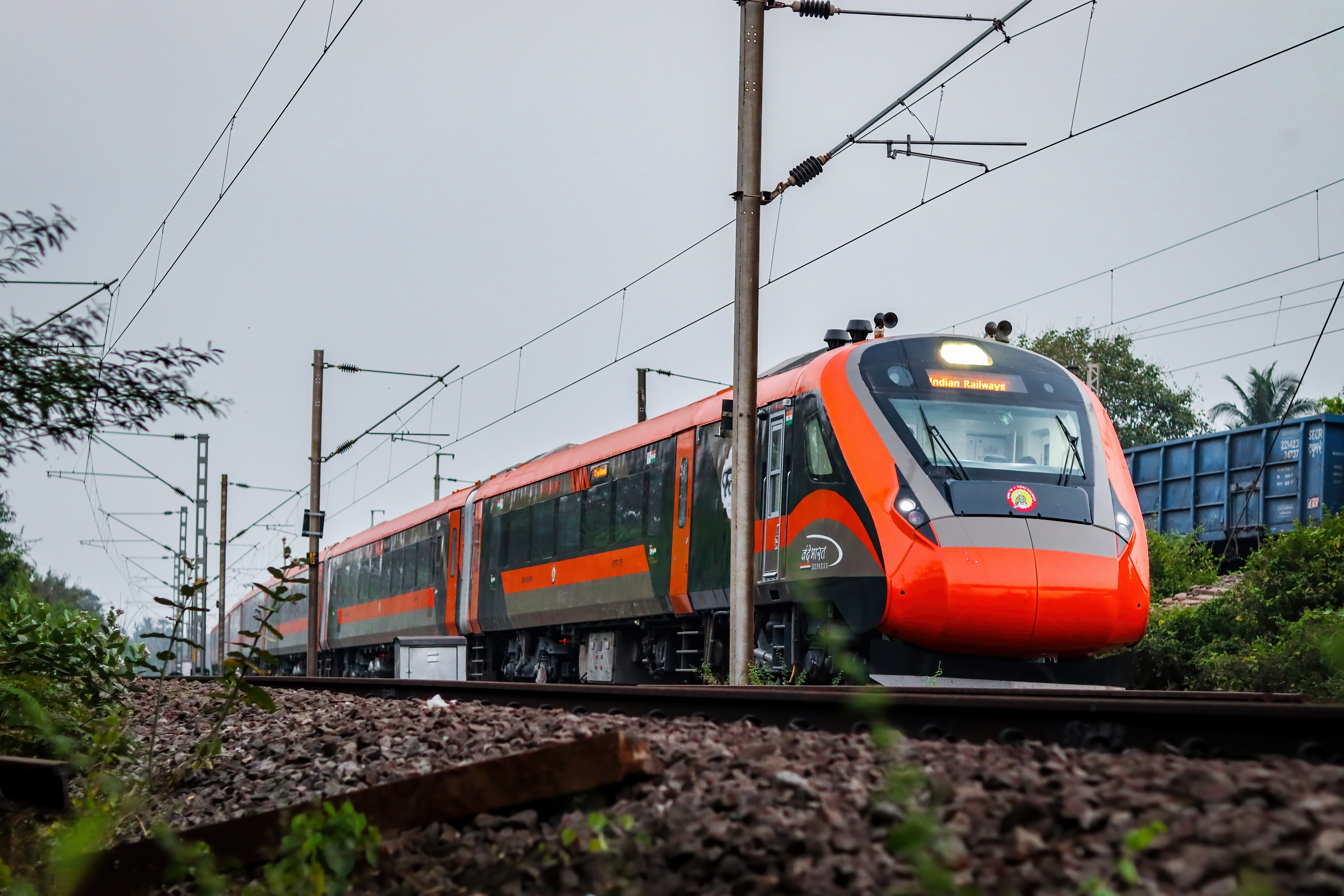
Vande Bharat trains have set a new record of 183km/hr speed in trials

Indian Railways have planned to introduce Vande Bharat trains in inner parts of India such as New Delhi-Kota, Ranchi-Sikkim,Ranchi-Puri, Raipur-Ranchi, Indore-Pune, Raipur-Varanasi, Pune-Goa, Goa-Mysore, Gokarna-Bangalore, Sikkim-Guwahati, Agartala-Guwahati, Indore-Lucknow to increase connectivity and economic development. Initially, the trains will operate at a maximum speed of 160 km/h, which will be increased to 200 km/h after the rails are strengthened and fenced off. The Gatimaan Express began services on April 5, 2016, after safety clearances were obtained on its first route. Currently, Vande Bharat Express is the fastest train running on 66 routes with highest trial speed of 183 km/h, with potential of reaching up to 200 km/h.

Mission Raftaar was announced in the Railway Budget of 2016-17 with the target of increasing the average speed of freight and superfast mail/express trains. The railway is focusing on the New Delhi-Mumbai and New Delhi-Howrah routes as part of the Golden Quadrilateral. Mission Raftar comprises several measures achieve its medium- and long-term, including the construction of tracks, bridges, rail flyovers, bypasses, right-powering of trains, third and fourth line construction, replacement of conventional loco-hauled trains by MEMUs, changes in timetable, and modification of the 1×25 KV traction system to the 2×25 KV traction system, among others. The country has made target of having 4,500 Vande Bharat trains running across India by 2047. Indian Railways will soon start the upgradation of tracks with high strength rails (R-350).The railways has started the work to increase the design speed limit of the next-generation Vande Bharat sleeper trains to 220 kmph and work has also started to improve the Delhi-Mumbai and Delhi-Howrah lines to allow trains to run at 160 km/h.

=== List of upcoming Vande Bharat Express services ===
1. Jamshedpur - Patna
2. Jamshedpur - Berhampur
3. Hyderabad - Bhubaneswar
4. Hyderabad - Pune
5. Nagpur - Pune
6. Nagpur - Hyderabad
7. Nagpur - Bhopal
8. Khajuraho - Bhopal
9. Ahmedabad - Bhopal
10. Ahmedabad - Okha
11. Ahmedabad - Jaipur
12. Jaipur - Agra - Kanpur
13. Jaipur - Chandigarh
14. Jaipur - Sriganganagar
15. Jaipur - Jodhpur
16. Jaipur - Jaisalmer
17. Jaipur - Indore
18. Indore - Gwalior
19. Indore - Surat (Udhna)
20. Indore - Khajuraho
21. Indore - Lucknow
22. Vadodara - Hapa
23. Mumbai - Kolhapur
24. Mumbai - Belagavi
25. Bangalore - Coimbatore
26. Bangalore - Tirupati
27. Bangalore - Mangalore
28. Kochi - Mangalore
29. Trivandrum - Bangalore
30. Kochi - Coimbatore
31. Mangalore - Mysore
32. Mangalore - solapur - kalaburagi
33. Chennai Central - Hyderabad
34. Chennai Egmore - Kanyakumari
35. Tirupati - Chennai - Pondicherry
36. Tirupati - Visakhapatnam
37. Visakhapatnam - Shalimar
38. Visakhapatnam - Bhubaneswar
39. Visakhapatnam - Raipur
40. Pune - Londa - Goa
41. Pune - Kohlapur
42. Pune - Hubli
43. Pune - Vadodara
44. Pune - Indore - Bhopal
45. Raipur - Bhubaneswar
46. Raipur - Rourkela
47. Howrah - Bokaro Steel City
48. Howrah - Varanasi
49. Haridwar - Varanasi
50. Gorakhpur - Kanpur
51. Gorakhpur - Prayagraj
52. Saharanpur - Prayagraj
53. Chitrakoot - Prayagraj - Lucknow
54. Delhi - Lucknow
55. Delhi - Kota
56. Delhi - Sriganganagar
57. Delhi - Kathgodam
58. Dehradun - Tanakpur
59. Dehradun - Kathgodam
60. Lucknow - Kathgodam
61. Lucknow - Dehradun
62. Lucknow - Varanasi
63. Ranchi - Deoghar
64. Ranchi - New Jalpaiguri
65. Ranchi - Puri
66. Chennai Egmore - Rameshwaram
67. Ranchi - Raipur
68. Varanasi - Deoghar
69. Varanasi - Jabalpur
70. Patna - Deoghar
71. Jammu - Srinagar

=== Dedicated freight corridors(dfc) ===
Dedicated freight corridors of 3,300 km length will also be completed thus freeing the dual use high demand trunk routes for running more high-speed passenger trains. The project will continue to figure on the high priority list of all the government agencies associated with it. DFCs will help India reduce its high logistics costs from some 13-15 per cent of the GDP and help it move towards the target of 8 per cent.

Till date in the commissioned sections, a total of 4000 trains have been run. Some of the trains in the section are achieving the average speed of 99.38 kmph in EDFC and the average speed is 89.50 kmph in WDFC. Passenger train such as Vande Bharat Express have already ran on DFC tracks during exigencies.

=== High-speed rail ===
The Indian government conducted joint surveys with a Japanese government team in 2014, finally approving a corridor between Mumbai and Ahmedabad. The new high-speed service will use a Japanese Shinkansen system and rolling stock. The cost of procuring the technology is estimated to be around ₹110,000 crore (US$12 billion). India and Japan signed agreements for the project in December 2015; the Japanese government will fund 81% of the total cost with a soft loan fixed at a nominal interest rate. A special committee has recommended the trains be run on an elevated corridor for an additional cost of ₹10,000 crore (US$1 billion), to avoid the difficulties of acquiring land, building underpasses and constructing protective fencing. Indian Railways will operate the corridor for a five-year period after its commissioning and afterwards will be turned over to a private operator.

Construction work of the corridor began in 2017 and will be completed by 2028. However, there is uncertainty in other routes as many of the routes have been junked as unfeasible.

=== Rolling stock ===
==== Modern locomotive factories ====
In 2015, plans were disclosed for the construction of two locomotive factories with foreign partnerships in the state of Bihar, at Madhepura (electric) and at Marhowra (diesel). The diesel locomotive works will be jointly operated in a partnership with General Electric, which has invested ₹2,052 crore (US$219 million) for its construction and the electric locomotive works with Alstom, which has invested ₹1,293.57 crore (US$138 million). The factories will provide IR with 800 electric locomotives of 12,000 horsepower and a mix of 1,000 diesel locomotives of 4,500 and 6,000 horsepower each. In November 2015, it was announced IR and GE would engage in an 11-year joint venture in which GE would hold a majority stake of 74%. IR would purchase 100 goods locomotives a year for 10 years, beginning in 2017; the locomotives would be modified versions of the GE Evolution series. The diesel locomotive works will be built by 2018; GE will import the first 100 locomotives and manufacture the remaining 900 in India from 2019 onwards, also assuming responsibility for their maintenance over a 13-year period. In the same month, a ₹20,000 crore (US$2 billion) partnership with Alstom to supply 800 electric locomotives from 2018 to 2028 was announced.

Indian Railways is now moving to manufacturing high-end aluminium self-propelled 160 km/hour indigenous Make in India coaches that require no locomotive and are 10% cheaper than the comparable imports. The first such self-propelled train, Vande Bharat Express, was rolled out in October 2018. It is estimated to be 40% cheaper than foreign-built trains.

==== Railway coach refurbishment ====
Railway coach refurbishment project aims for the refurbishment of 12 to 15 years old coaches at Carriage Rehabilitation Workshop in Bhopal to enhance passenger amenities and fire safety measures.

==== Bio-toilets in all trains ====
In 2014, IR and DRDO developed a bio-toilet to replace direct-discharge toilets, which was the primary type of toilet used in railway coaches. Upgrade of all trains to bio-toilet was completed by the end of FY2018-19 (c. Dec 2017).

The direct discharge of human waste from trains onto the tracks corrodes rails, costing IR tens of millions of rupees a year in rail-replacement work. Flushing a bio-toilet discharges human waste into an underfloor holding tank where anaerobic bacteria remove harmful pathogens and break the waste down into neutral water and methane, which can then be harmlessly discharged onto the tracks. IR plans to completely phase out direct-discharge toilets by 2020 or 2021. All-new coaches were installed in 2016, with older rolling stock to gradually becoming retrofitted. After Comptroller and Auditor General of India found 200,000 complaints related to the foul smelling and blocked bio-toilets, IR announced that it will add 80,000 bio-toilets (each costing INR 1 lakh) in FY2018-2019 and will start installing much improved "vacuum bio-toilets" (each costing INR 2.5 lakh) as well. By Feb 2018, over 100,000 biotoilets have been installed and the project is on target to have 100% biotoilets by 31 March 2019.

=== Hyperloop ===
==== Mumbai–Pune hyperloop ====
Mumbai–Pune hyperloop is a proposed 1000 km/h Hyperloop system that will take 14 minutes compared to current 3 hours to commute between these two cities while carrying 10,000 commuters per hour (5,000 in each direction). The route is found feasible and can be made operational by 2026 as per the Detailed Project Report (DPR) submitted to "Pune Metropolitan Region Development Authority" (PMRDA) by "Virgin Hyperloop company" in January 2018. Commuters and cargo will travel in pods traveling in the near-vacuum tubes at the speed of 1,000 km/h. DPR provided three feasible terminal end-points options in Mumbai, namely Dadar, Santacruz and the international airport. Currently, 300,000 people commute between these two cities daily in 110,000 vehicles (including 80,000 cars and 6,000 buses). (as of Jan 2018)

On December 2024, India's First Hyperloop Test track was completed successfully at Thaiyur near Chennai and soon trials are about to start on this test track.

== Infrastructure ==
=== Stations ===
==== Station redevelopment ====
Under a INR 1 trillion initiative, 600 railway stations will be redeveloped by monetizing 2700 acres of spare railway land under the ₹1,070,000 crore (US$114 billion) plan undertaken by Indian Railway Stations Development Corporation by converging it with the Atal Mission for Rejuvenation and Urban Transformation and Smart Cities Mission in collaboration with Ministry of Urban Development, Rail Land Development Authority and National Buildings Construction Corporation. Following monetization of land, ₹680,000 crore (US$73 billion) will be used for the commercial development, ₹280,000 crore (US$30 billion) for station redevelopment and the remaining ₹110,000 crore (US$12 billion) as surplus with the Railways. Initially A1 and A category stations will be prioritised. To begin with 22 stations will be developed by end of 2018.

Under Amrit Bharat Station Scheme, invited proposals in February 2023 for redeveloping 2000 stations over next decade, including the Gandhinagar railway station, Banaras railway station, Chandigarh railway station, Bijwasan railway station and Anand Vihar railway station costing Rs140 crore, Rs310 crore and Rs206 crore respective.

=== Tracks ===
==== Dedicated freight corridors ====
There are 2 under implementation and 4 approved DFCs with many more planned. DFC will convert existing and implement new DFC as High-speed rail corridors of India.

==== Geostrategic border rail lines ====
In 2012, Ministry of Defence (MoD) identified a list of at least 15 new geostrategic rail lines (initially 14 and Bilaspur–Manali–Leh line was added later) to be constructed near China, Pakistan and Nepal border for the rapid and easier deployment of troops while simultaneously undertaking development of geostrategic India-China Border Roads (ICBR) roads as border rail and road transport development in India is lagging much behind China. China has built lines up to Shigatse in Tibet, with plans to connect it to Nepal and further to India. Surveys of all 15 lines is complete, and in June 2025 at least 4 lines were under construction and DPR was being prepared for another 3 while there was no progress on another 7 (50% of the lines).

Phase	Line	length	Border	State	FLS	Cabinet construction funding approval	Construction status	Comment
Phase-I	Murkongselek–Pasighat–Tezu–Rupai line	227 km	China (Eastern sector)	Arunachal Pradesh, Assam	Yes	No	Not commenced	Map
Phase-I	Missamari–Tenga–Tawang line	378 km	China, Bhutan (Eastern sector)	Arunachal Pradesh, Assam	Yes	No	Not commenced	Map
Phase-I	Lakhimpur–Along–Silapathar line	249 km	China (Eastern sector)	Arunachal Pradesh, Assam	Yes	No	Not commenced	Map
Phase-I	Bhanupli–Manali–Leh line	498 km	China, Pakistan (Western sector)	Himachal Pradesh, Ladakh	Yes	No	Construction underway as of June 2025.	Map
	Srinagar-Kargil-Leh line		China, Pakistan (Western sector)	Ladakh, Jammu and Kashmir	Yes	No	Survey done, DPR on hold in 2025 due to lack of financial viability.	Map
	Pathankot-Leh line		China, Pakistan (Western sector)	Ladakh, Punjab	Yes	No	Survey done, DPR being prepared in 2025.	Map
	Dehradun–Uttarkashi line (Gangotri)		China (Central sector)	Uttarakhand	Yes	Yes	Under construction, see Char Dham Railway.	Map
	Rishikesh–Karanprayag line (via Chamoli)		(Central sector)	Uttarakhand	Yes	Yes	Under construction, also see Char Dham Railway.	Map
	Tanakpur–Jauljibi line		Nepal (Central sector)	Uttarakhand	No	No	Not commenced	Map
	Tanakpur–Bageshwar line		(Central sector)	Uttarakhand	No	No	Not commenced	Map
	Jammu–Akhnoor–Poonch line		(Western sector)	Jammu and Kashmir	Yes	No	Survey done, DPR being prepared in 2025.	Map
	Firozpur-Patti line		Pakistan (Western sector)	Punjab	Yes	No	Under-construction (target completion Dec 2028).	Map
	Anupgarh–Khajuwala-Jaisalmer line (443 km long) main route and 115 km Khajuwala-Bikaner spur.		Pakistan (Western sector)	Rajasthan	Yes	No	Not commenced	Map. FSL was underway in March 2026, for both ₹2,277 crore 187-km long Anupgarh-Khajuwala section and 260 km long Khajuwala-Jaisalmer section, as well as the Khajuwala-Bikaner spur.
	Jaisalmer-Barmer-Bhiladi line (380 km long)		Pakistan (Western sector)	Rajasthan-Gujarat	Yes	No	Not commenced	Map. FSL was underway in March 2026, for both ₹2,277 crore 187-km long Anupgarh-Khajuwala section and 260 km long Khajuwala-Jaisalmer section, as well as the Khajuwala-Bikaner spur. from the existing Jaisalmer railway station to the existing Bhildi Junction railway station or Bhabhar railway station in Gujarat via Gudamalani and Sanchore.
	Jodhpur–Agolai–Shergarh–Phalsund line		Pakistan (Western sector)	Rajasthan	No	No	Not commenced	Map
	Jodhpur–Jaisalmer line doubling		Pakistan (Western sector)	Rajasthan	Yes			Map

Following projects along the LAC with China are also of relevance, only one of these is included in the MoD's list of strategically important defence projects, however all of these have been declared projects of strategic national importance.

- Char Dham Railway in Uttrakhand
  - Dehradun–Uttarkashi–Maneri Gangotri Railway, included in the MoD list, will serve the disputed Nelang-Pulam Sumda area of LAC.
  - Uttarkashi–Palar Yamunotri Railway, 22 km long route, will serve disputed Nelang-Pulam Sumda area of LAC.
  - Karnaprayag–Saikot–Sonprayag Kedarnath Railway 99 km long route, will serve disputed Nelang-Pulam Sumda and Bara Hoti area of LAC.
  - Saikot–Joshimath Badrinath Railway, 75 km long route will serve disputed Nelang-Pulam Sumda and Bara Hoti area of LAC.
- Sivok–Rangpo line (Gangtok) in Sikkim, 44 km long line, will serve disputed area of Doklam on LAC,

==== Track gauge conversion ====
Indian Railways is converting its entire network to 1,676 mm (5 ft 6 in) broad gauge to enhance viability. New and converted broad gauge tracks are being introduced at the rate of 7.7 km per day. IR has projected completion date of the same till 2022.

==== Track electrification ====
Electrification of all routes to save on the imported fuel costs and improve running speed, IR launched "Mission Electrification" in 2017 to electrify 100% or the remaining 38,000 km of the broad gauge network in five years from fy2017-18 to fy2022-23, Railways annual fuel bill is ₹32,000 crore (US$3.42 billion or €3.05 billion), including ₹20,000 crore (US$2.14 billion or €1.90 billion) on diesel and converting to 100% electricity will save ₹10,000 crore (US$1.07 billion or €951.89 million) by bringing the total fuel bill to ₹22,000 crore (US$2.35 billion or €2.09 billion) (c. Dec 2017). Completion of electrification at the end of March 2024 was 45,881 km (28,509 mi) or 94.44%.

===== Equipment =====
To reduce maintenance costs and improve the reliability of power supply systems, CORE has adopted state-of-the-art technology: cast resin transformers, SF_{6} circuit breakers or vacuum switchgear, long-creepage solid-core insulators and PTFE-neutral sections. Eight-wheeled, self-propelled OHE inspection cars have been introduced to improve maintenance, and an OHE recording car has been requested to monitor the performance of overhead equipment.

===== SCADA =====
The 220-132-25 kV power-supply network for electrification extends along the track for about 200 to 300 kilometres (120 to 190 mi). It is remotely controlled from the division control centre to ensure an uninterrupted power supply to the track overhead equipment. In electrification projects, a microprocessor-based supervisory control and data acquisition (SCADA) control system is replacing the earlier electro-mechanical Strowger system of remote-control equipment. SCADA can telemeter voltage, current, maximum demand and power factor in real-time, enabling control of maximum demand and electrical cost. The system also provides automatic troubleshooting and isolation of faulty sections.

==== Doubling of tracks ====
Doubling of tracks to reduce congestion and delays while improving safety. 15,000 km double tracks already exist by 2016 and funding for 12,500 km more track doubling was approved in 2016. In fy2018-19 budget, 18,000 km of broad gauge track doubling and conversion was approved along with 36,000 km of track renewal for safety.

==== Track renewal ====
In FY 2018-19 budget, 36,000 km of broad gauge renewal was approved to enhance the safety.

=== Power and fuel ===
==== Off-the-grid solar-powered trains ====
Off-the-grid solar powered trains by installing 1 gigawatt of solar and 130 megawatts of wind power between 2017 and 2022. India introduced world's first solar powered train in June 2017 as well as 50 coaches with rooftop solar farms. In July 2017, IR rolled out its first DEMU train with rooftop solar panels that power the lights, fans and information display systems inside passenger coaches.

==== Rooftop solar electricity ====
Rooftop solar electricity at stations to reduce long-term fuel cost and protect the environment.

==== Traintop solar electricity ====
In 2017, first train with solar rooftop panels started. Increasingly more trains will be operated with renewal onboard solar electricity generation.

==== LED lighting ====
Sustainable LED lighting on all stations by March 2018 to cut electricity costs (Dec 2017).

=== Safety ===
==== Elimination of unmanned level crossings on broad gauge network ====
Target completion date for this is March 2020. Fy2017-18 has allocated funds to eliminate remaining 4,267 unmanned railway crossings on broad gauge routes in the next two years by March 2020. A ₹100,000 crore (US$11 billion) "National Rail Safety Fund," for a complete safety upgrade by 2022, was announced in the 2017 Union Budget; among other improvements, the program would eliminate unmanned level crossings by March 2020. Elimination of Unmanned Level Crossings at an average of 1217 per year by building an average of 1066 Road Over Bridges (ROB) and Road Under Bridges (RUB) per year (May 2016).

==== Automated fog pilot assistance system ====
GPS-enabled Fog Pilot Assistance System railway signalling devices, old practice of putting firecrackers on train tracks to alert train divers was done away with by initially installing 6,095 devices in four most affected zones in 2017, Northern Railway zone, North Central Railway zone, North Eastern Railway zone and North Western Railway zone.

==== Automated fire alarm system ====
Automated fire alarm system project started from 2013 when improved automated fire alarm System in Rajdhani Express trains were installed, these will be installed in the AC coaches of all regular trains.

==== CCTV camera on stations ====
963 stations will have CCTV camera by the end of 2018. Progressively CCTV cameras and wifi will be installed on all trains and stations.

==== CCTV camera inside trains ====
IR has started to install cameras in some of the trains from fy2017-18 under the Nirbhaya fund. Progressively CCTV cameras will be installed in all trains.

=== Information technology ===
On 7 August 2019, IRCTC launched a payment wallet named iMudra. On 11 August 2021, IRCTC introduced a smart card system through which unreserved train tickets which can be bought either at railway stations or online.

Digital India driven digitalisation of railway to improvement efficiency and reduce cost. ₹3,500,000 million (equivalent to ₹5.4 trillion or US$57 billion in 2026) funding was approved in 2016.

== Services ==
=== Wi-fi-enabled trains and stations ===
Progressively CCTV cameras and wifi will be installed on all trains and stations (announcement c. March 2018). In September 2015, the IR and Google announced a joint initiative intent on delivering high-speed wi-fi access across 400 major railway stations. The first 100 stations were connected to the network by the end of 2016, with Mumbai Central station the first to be connected. The Railtel-Google free high-speed public WiFi service is currently available at Mumbai Central, Chennai Central, Chennai Egmore, Madurai Junction, Coimbatore Junction, Chandigarh, Old Delhi, Pune, Bhubaneshwar, Bhopal, Ranchi, Raipur, Vijayawada, Kacheguda, Ernakulum, Thiruvananthapuram, Thrissur, Jabalpur, Vishakhapatnam, Jaipur, Kanpur, Lucknow, Gorakhpur, Patna, Guwahati, Ujjain, Allahabad, Howrah, Varanasi, etc.

=== Tickets ===
Select passengers with confirmed tickets will now be allowed to transfer tickets to someone else. Indian Railway Catering and Tourism Corporation (IRCTC) is now offering a pay-on-delivery option for train tickets on its website and app, where the customers can book their tickets and pay on delivery.

=== Escalators ===
Progressively escalators will be installed on all stations with a footfall of more than 25,000 per day.

=== Station upgrades ===
600 stations will be upgraded, including 400 to be redeveloped, progressively to enhance services, safety and security.

== Social responsibility ==
=== Rainwater harvesting ===
Rainwater harvesting with 1885 rainwater harvesting systems already installed at different locations by December 2016.

=== Reforestation ===
Reforestation on the railway land and along the tracks is being undertaken.

== See also ==
- High-speed rail in India
- List of high-speed railway lines in India
- Dedicated freight corridors in India
- North Eastern Railway Connectivity Project
- Amrit Bharat Station Scheme

Similar roads development

- Bharatmala
- India-China Border Roads, Subsumed in Bharatmala
- Expressways of India
- Setu Bharatam

Similar ports and river transport development

- Indian Rivers Inter-link
- List of national waterways in India
- Sagar Mala project

Similar air transport development

- Indian Human Spaceflight Programme
- UDAN

General

- Transport in India
- Water transport in India
