= Char Dham Railway =

Railway line in Uttarakhand, India

Overview
- Status: Under-construction
- Locale: Uttarakhand
- Termini: Start at Doiwala for Yamunotri and Gangotri routes, Start at Karnaprayag for Kedarnath and Badrinath routes; End at Palar for Yamunotri, End at Maneri for Gangotri, End at Sonprayag for Kedarnath route, End at Joshimath for Badrinath route
- Website: http://www.indianrailways.gov.in

Service
- System: Broad Gauge
- Services: Two separate Y-fork railways with a total of four individual routes
- Operator: Indian Railways

Technical
- Line length: 327 km (203 mi)
- Track length: 327 km (203 mi)
- Track gauge: 1,676 mm (5 ft 6.0 in)
- Electrification: 25kV OHE
- Operating speed: 110 kmph
- Highest elevation: 1,733 m (5,686 ft)

The Char Dham Railway, the Indian Railways's under-construction 453 km long railway lines network for connecting the holiest places of Hinduism called Chota Char Dham, includes two set of y-fork shaped rail links, first the A1 "Rishikesh–Karnaprayag-Karnaprayag–Saikot–Sonprayag Kedarnath Railway" from the existing Yog Nagari Rishikesh railway station to Kedarnath (Sonprayag railhead) with a A2 "Saikot–Joshimath Badrinath Railway" fork (Joshimath railhead), and second B1 Doiwala–Dehradun–Uttarkashi–Maneri Gangotri Railway from the Dehradun's existing Doiwala railway station to Gangotri (Maneri railhead) with a B2 Uttarkashi–Palar Yamunotri Railway (Palar railhead) fork. The line is also of strategic military importance and has been designated a national project.

== Details ==
Char Dham Railway project, with 327 km long lines will cost ₹74,000 crore (US$9 billion).

=== Strategic importance ===
Once this railway line is completed, India-China border will be closer to the rest of India by railways. The time taken to reach the strategic border military stations from Delhi will be reduced by providing safe and quick mode of public transport for personnel and equipment.

=== Challenges ===
Like the Konkan Railway, Hassan–Mangalore line and Jammu–Baramulla line, this line was also a challenging railway project in Indian Railways due to its mountainous terrain. It also included a large number of tunnels, high bridges and experienced severe cold weather. The area was also flood, landslide and earthquake prone.

== Route ==
The Char Dham Railway has two different Y-shaped railways, with total of the following four individual rail lines:

  - "Rishikesh-Kedarnath–Badrinath rail link" taking off from the existing Rishikesh railway station to Karnaprayag and going towards Kedarnath ((terminating at Sonprayag railhead few kilometers before Kedarnath), with a fork towards Badrinath ((terminating at Joshimath railhead few kilometers before Badrinath).
  - "Doiwala-Gangotri–Yamunotri rail link" taking off from the existing railway Doiwala railway station and going towards Gangotri (terminating at Maneri railhead few kilometers before Gangotri), with a fork towards Yamunotri (terminating at Palar railhead few kilometers before Yamunotri).

=== A. Rishikesh-Kedarnath–Badrinath railway ===
Rishikesh-Karanprayag-Saikot-Kedarnath main spur will go to Kedarnath which will also Y–fork at Saikot for another spur to Badrinath.

  - A1. Rishikesh–Karnaprayag line, 125.2 km, from existing Yog Nagari Rishikesh railway station to Karnaprayag with following stations (1 existing and 10 new): Rishikesh, Shivpuri, Byasi, Devprayag, Maletha, Srinagar, Dhari, Rudraprayag, Gholtir, Gauchar, Karnaprayag.
  - A2. Karnaprayag–Saikot–Sonprayag Kedarnath Railway 99 km long route will have the following 7 stations: Karnaprayag, Siwai, Saikot Junction, Bairath, Chopta, Makkumath and Sonprayag near Gaurikund. The distance from Sonprayag to Kedarnath is 19 km. The 6 km stretch from Sonprayag to Gaurikund is paved and motorable, whereas the remaining 13-14 km is a mountainous track, which must be done either on foot, or by palanquin, or on pony-back.
  - A3. Saikot–Joshimath Badrinath Railway (spur from A2), 75 km long route will make a "Y" fork connection at Saikot from the Kedarnath railway above to Joshimath. It will have the following 4 stations: Saikot Junction, Tripak, Tartoli and Joshimath. Pilgrims will travel the 37 km from Joshimath to Badrinath by the existing all-weather road. This will take the railway network closer to the disputed India-China border area of Bara Hoti valley, which is currently in India's operational control, and make it easier to supply equipment and troops to that border post.

=== B. Doiwala-Gangotri–Yamunotri railway ===
"Doiwala-Uttarkashi–Maneri Gangotri" main spur will go to Gangotri which will also Y–fork at Uttarkashi for "Uttarkashi–Palar rail" link spur to Yamunotri.

  - B1. Doiwala–Dehradun–Uttarkashi–Maneri Gangotri Railway 131 km long route will have the following 11 stations: Doiwala, Sangatiyawala Khurd, Sarangdharwala, Ampata, Maror, Kandisaur, Chinyalisaur, Dunda, Athali Junction, Ladari and Maneri. Pilgrims will use the road transport from Maneri to Harsil-Gangotri via NH-34. This will take the railway and Char Dham road highway at Gangotri closer to the large disputed India-China border area of Nelang Valley which is currently in India's operational control. Maneri to Gangotri is further 84 km.
  - B2. Uttarkashi–Palar Yamunotri Railway (spurt from B1), 22 km long route will make a "Y" fork connection at Athali Junction from the Gangotri railway above to reach Palar railway station, from where pilgrims will take road and track to Yamunotri. Palar to Yamunotri is a further 42 km.

== Related connectivity ==
While Char Dham Rail will connect the area in Gharwal region, the DPR for the following new rail lines were announced in the 2024-25 to connect the other regions of Uttrakhand:

- Kumaon region
  - Tanakpur-Bageshwar-Gairsain-Karanprayag line: has the following two components.
    - Tanakpur-Bageshwar line: from Tanakpur in southeast to Bageshwar in northwest.
    - Bageshwar-Gairsain-Karanprayag line: from Bageshwar in east to Gairsain in west.
  - Tanakpur-Pithoragarh-Jauljibi line: One of the strategic line required by the Army.
- Terai region:
  - Haridwar-Saharanpur line: from Haridwar in northeast to Saharanpur in southwest.

== Current status ==
- Overall:
  - 2017 May: Char Dham Railway project, with 327 km long lines costing ₹74,000 crore (US$9 billion), began with the foundation stone laying and commencement of ₹120 crore Final Location Survey (FSL) in May 2017 by the Union Minister of Railways Suresh Prabhu.
  - 2018 Jan: reconnaissance survey completed, and 2-year long final survey using airborne electromagnetic technique commenced. Land for all railway stations was being acquired and work was going on in small phases over the entire route.
  - 2025 Jul: Only "A1. Rishikesh–Karnaprayag line" is under-construction, construction for other lines is yet to commence, final completion date is yet to be decided.
- A1. Rishikesh–Karnaprayag line, 125.2 km, 11 stations, under-construction.
- A2. Karnaprayag–Saikot–Sonprayag Kedarnath Railway, 99 km, 7 stations:
  - 2023 Dec: feasibility study completed, environmental clearance granted, Detailed Project Report (DPR) was being prepared.
- A3. Saikot–Joshimath Badrinath Railway (spur from A2), 75 km, 4 stations:
  - 2024 Feb: Detailed Project Report (DPR) was being prepared.
- B1. Doiwala–Dehradun–Uttarkashi–Maneri Gangotri Railway, 131 km, 11 stations:
  - 2024 Jan: feasibility study completed.
- B2. Maneri-Uttarkashi–Palar Yamunotri Railway (spur from B1), 46 km, 5 stations:
  - 2024 Feb: On hold due to the lack of environmental clearance.

== See also ==
- Char Dham Highway
- Diamond Quadrilateral railway project
- Golden Quadrilateral road project
- Setu Bharatam railway crossing-free flyover and underpass project
- New geostrategic rail lines of India under construction
