= Saikot–Joshimath Badrinath Railway =

Overview
- Status: Proposed
- Locale: Uttarakhand
- Termini: Saikot; Joshimath
- Website: http://www.indianrailways.gov.in

Service
- System: Broad Gauge
- Services: Single track
- Operator(s): Indian Railways

Technical
- Line length: 75 km (47 mi)
- Track length: 75 km (47 mi)
- Track gauge: 1,676 mm (5 ft 6.0 in)
- Highest elevation: 1,733 m (5,686 ft)

The Saikot–Joshimath Badrinath Railway, notified as a project of national strategic importance, is one of Indian Railways's four constituent routes of the proposed Char Dham Railway connecting the holiest Chota Char Dham of Hinduism. This 75 km route starts at Saikot and ends at Joshimath 46 km before Badrinath.

== Railway routes ==
The 75 km route starts from a "Y" fork at Saikot off Karnaprayag–Saikot–Sonprayag Kedarnath Railway, and ends at Joshimath where people can ride or trek further 46 km to Badrinath.

Rishikesh–Karnaprayag Railway is also an under construction, new railway link extension from the Yog Nagri Rishikesh railway station to Karnaprayag.

== Current status ==
Char Dham Railway project's 327 km long construction, costing INR ₹43,292 crore (USD $6.6 billion), began with the foundation stone laying and commencement of INR ₹120 crore Final Location Survey (FSL) in May 2017 by the Union Railway minister Suresh Prabhu.

== See also ==
- Doiwala–Dehradun–Uttarkashi–Maneri Gangotri Railway
- Uttarkashi–Palar Yamunotri Railway
- Karnaprayag–Saikot–Sonprayag Kedarnath Railway
- Rishikesh–Karnaprayag Railway
- Diamond Quadrilateral railway project
- Golden Quadrilateral road project
- Setu Bharatam railway crossing-free flyover and underpass project
