= Karnaprayag–Saikot–Sonprayag Kedarnath Railway =

Railway line in India

Overview
- Status: Proposed
- Locale: Uttarakhand
- Termini: Karnaprayag; Sonprayag
- Stations: Saikot
- Website: http://www.indianrailways.gov.in

Service
- System: Broad Gauge
- Services: Single track
- Operator(s): Indian Railways

Technical
- Line length: 99 km (62 mi)
- Track length: 99 km (62 mi)
- Track gauge: 1,676 mm (5 ft 6.0 in)
- Highest elevation: 1,650 m (5,410 ft)

The Karnaprayag–Saikot–Sonprayag Kedarnath Railway, notified as the project of national strategic importance, is Indian Railways's one of the four constituent routes of the proposed Char Dham Railway connecting the holiest Chota Char Dham of Hinduism. This 99 km route starts from Karnaprayag and ends at Sonprayag 13 km before Kedarnath.

== Railway Routes ==
The 99 km route starts from a "Y" fork at Karnaprayag off under construction Rishikesh–Karnaprayag Railway, goes via Saikot and ends at Sonprayag where people can trek further 13 km to Kedarnath.

Rishikesh–Karnaprayag Railway is also an under construction new railway link extension from the existing Rishikesh railway station to Karnaprayag.

== Current status ==
Char Dham Railway project's 327 km long construction, costing INR ₹43,292 crore (USD $6.6 billion), began with the foundation stone laying and commencement of INR ₹120 crore Final Location Survey (FSL) in May 2017 by the Union Railway minister Suresh Prabhu.

== See also ==
- Doiwala–Dehradun–Uttarkashi–Maneri Gangotri Railway
- Uttarkashi–Palar Yamunotri Railway
- Saikot–Joshimath Badrinath Railway
- Rishikesh–Karnaprayag Railway
- Diamond Quadrilateral railway project
- Golden Quadrilateral road project
- Setu Bharatam railway crossing-free flyover and underpass project
