= Rishikesh–Karnaprayag line =

Railway under construction in India

Overview
- Status: Under construction
- Owner: Rail Vikas Nigam
- Locale: Uttarakhand
- Termini: Yog Nagari Rishikesh; Karnaprayag
- Stations: 12
- Website: http://www.indianrailways.gov.in

Service
- System: Broad gauge
- Services: Single track
- Operator: Indian Railways

Technical
- Line length: 126 km (78 mi)
- Track length: 126 km (78 mi)
- Track gauge: 1,676 mm (5 ft 6 in)
- Minimum radius: 440 m (1,440 ft)
- Electrification: 25 kV 50 Hz AC OHE
- Operating speed: 100 km/h (62 mph)
- Highest elevation: 1,451 m (4,760 ft)

The Rishikesh–Karnaprayag line is a 126 km long under-construction railway line, connecting Yog Nagari Rishikesh railway station in Rishikesh city in the Himalayan foothills Sivalik Hills to Karnaprayag city in the Garhwal region in Lower Himalayan Range of Uttarakhand state of India. It is the main feeder route to Indian Railways' Char Dham Railway project which aims to connect the Char Dham pilgrimage shrines of Yamunotri, Gangotri, Badrinath and Kedarnath. As part of an Indian geostrategic initiative to build infrastructure along the India-China border to discourage Chinese expansion, this rail line is of national strategic importance, which will cut down the travel time to 2 and half hours by railway from earlier 8 hours taken by the road.

== History ==
Satpal Maharaj began a survey for the project as Minister of Railways of Uttarakhand in 1996.

The project's foundation stone was scheduled to be laid by United Progressive Alliance chairperson Sonia Gandhi on 9 November 2011. Alignment of the 126-kilometer-long railway project was completed in 2013, but the project was delayed by political wrangling.

The detailed feasibility work finally began in 2015 under the leadership of Narendra Modi led National Democratic Alliance government. Design contracts for tunnel and bridge construction were awarded in 2019. Italferr, the engineering arm of FS Italiane Group, received the contract for the design and supervision of the 12-km-long section (running almost entirely through tunnels) of the Himalaya Tunnel as part of a joint venture with Swiss firm Lombardi SA. That construction began in 2018. Work on the first block section, from the Virbhadra railway station to Yog Nagari Rishikesh, began in June 2018 and was completed in 2020.

== Strategic importance ==
It will play a vital role in national security and the welfare of Uttarakhand, by reducing travel time between Rishikesh and Karnaprayag from 6-7 hours to 2 1/2 hours. The line will serve pilgrims and local residents, and will be able to rapidly move troops to the India-China border.

== Project features ==
This ₹16,200 crore (US$1.7 billion) project, with 35 bridges, and 105 km (85 percent) will run through 17 tunnels including 15.1-km Devprayag-Lachmoli tunnel which was reportedly India's longest tunnel in 2016.

== Route ==
The Rishikesh–Karnaprayag line, which begins at Yog Nagari Rishikesh station (385 m ) and ends at Karnaprayag station (825 m ) city, will have the following 12 stations (sequentially listed southwest to northwest direction) all of which are in Uttarakhand state.

- Dehradun district
  - Yog Nagari Rishikesh in Rishikesh: since the railway line could not be extended from the Rishikesh railway station (RKSH) in the city through densely populated areas, a rail line was built from the Virbhadra station to the new Yog Nagari Rishikesh railway station (YNRK).
- Tehri Garhwal district
  - Muni Ki Reti
- Pauri Garhwal district
  - Shivpuri
- Tehri Garhwal district
  - Manjilgaon
  - Sakni
  - Devprayag
  - Kirtinagar
- Pauri Garhwal district
  - Srinagar
  - Dungripanth (Dhari devi)
- Rudraprayag district
  - Dhari
  - Gholtir
- Chamoli district
  - Karnaprayag

== Related connectivity ==
- Char Dham Railway: Rishikesh–Karnaprayag line is a feeder line to the Char Dham Railway, the later has the following 4 sub-sections:
  - Doiwala–Dehradun–Uttarkashi–Maneri Gangotri Railway
    - Uttarkashi–Palar Yamunotri Railway, midway fork from the Gangotri Railway
  - Karnaprayag–Saikot–Sonprayag Kedarnath Railway
    - Saikot–Joshimath Badrinath Railway, midway fork from the Kedarnath Railway
- Char Dham Highway: will complement the Rishikesh–Karnaprayag line mostly along the same route
- Parvatmala, ropeway project across India, including ropeways in some of the destinations of the Rishikesh–Karnaprayag line

== Status ==
- 2024 Nov: 60% of the project's budget has been utilised with 70% work completed, with 28 of the 38 planned tunnel breakthroughs completed, and the remaining 10 are scheduled for breakthroughs by March 2025, 11 stations were under-construction.
- 2025 Nov: 201 km tunneling work out of 213 completed. The earlier project completion date of December 2026 has been revised to more realistic completion date of December 2028.
- 2025 Dec:76 % physical work completed with 69% budget spent (Rs 26,841 crore out of the total estimated Rs 38,953 crore project cost).

== See also ==
- Diamond Quadrilateral (railway project)
- Golden Quadrilateral (road project)
- Setu Bharatam (project to eliminate at-grade crossings)
