= Uttarkashi–Palar Yamunotri Railway =

Railway line in India

Overview
- Status: Proposed
- Locale: Uttarakhand
- Termini: Uttarkashi; Palar
- Website: http://www.indianrailways.gov.in

Service
- System: Broad Gauge
- Services: Single track
- Operator(s): Indian Railways

Technical
- Line length: 22 km (14 mi)
- Track length: 22 km (14 mi)
- Track gauge: 1,676 mm (5 ft 6.0 in)
- Highest elevation: 1,265 m (4,150 ft)

The Uttarkashi–Palar Yamunotri Railway, notified as the project of national strategic importance, is Indian Railways's one of the four constituent routes of the proposed Char Dham Railway connecting the holiest Chota Char Dham of Hinduism. This 22 km route starts from Uttarkashi and ends at Palar near Yamunotri.

== Railway routes ==
The 22 km route starts from a "Y" fork at Uttarkashi off Doiwala–Dehradun–Uttarkashi–Maneri Gangotri Railway and ends near Yamunotri at Palar 1265 m above mean sea level.

== Current status ==
Char Dham Railway project's 327 km long construction, costing INR ₹43,292 crore (USD $6.6 billion), began with the foundation stone laying and commencement of INR ₹120 crore Final Location Survey (FSL) in May 2017 by the Union Railway minister Suresh Prabhu.

== See also ==
- Doiwala–Dehradun–Uttarkashi–Maneri Gangotri Railway
- Saikot–Joshimath Badrinath Railway
- Karnaprayag–Saikot–Sonprayag Kedarnath Railway
- Rishikesh–Karnaprayag Railway
- Diamond Quadrilateral railway project
- Golden Quadrilateral road project
- Setu Bharatam railway crossing-free flyover and underpass project
