= Doiwala–Dehradun–Uttarkashi–Maneri Gangotri Railway =

Railway line in India

Overview
- Status: Proposed
- Locale: Uttarakhand
- Termini: Doiwala; Maneri
- Stations: Dehradun, Uttarkashi
- Website: http://www.indianrailways.gov.in

Service
- System: Broad Gauge
- Services: Single track
- Operator: Indian Railways

Technical
- Line length: 131 km (81 mi)
- Track length: 131 km (81 mi)
- Track gauge: 1,676 mm (5 ft 6.0 in)
- Highest elevation: 1,270 m (4,170 ft)

The Doiwala–Dehradun–Uttarkashi–Maneri Gangotri Railway, notified as the project of national strategic importance, is Indian Railways's one of the four constituent routes of the proposed Char Dham Railway connecting the holiest Chota Char Dham of Hinduism. This 131 km route starts from the existing Doiwala station near Dehradun and will terminate at Maneri close to Gangotri.

== Railway routes ==
The 131 km route from Doiwala via Uttarkashi ends at Maneri at 1270 m above mean sea level.

== Current status ==
Char Dham Railway project's 327 km long construction, costing INR ₹43,292 crore (USD $6.6 billion), began with the foundation stone laying and commencement of INR ₹120 crore Final Location Survey (FSL) in May 2017 by the Union Railway minister Suresh Prabhu.

== See also ==
- Uttarkashi–Palar Yamunotri Railway
- Saikot–Joshimath Badrinath Railway
- Karnaprayag–Saikot–Sonprayag Kedarnath Railway
- Rishikesh–Karnaprayag Railway
- Diamond Quadrilateral railway project
- Golden Quadrilateral road project
- Setu Bharatam railway crossing-free flyover and underpass project
