= Gokarna =

Gokarna may refer to:

== Places ==
- Gokarna, Karnataka, a town in Karnataka, India
- Gokarna, West Bengal, a village in West Bengal, India
- Gokarnamatam, a village in Andhra Pradesh, India
- Gola Gokarannath, a city in Lakhimpur Kheri district, Uttar Pradesh, India
- Trincomalee, a city in Eastern Province, Sri Lanka also known in its early history as Gokarna (Sanskrit) or Gokanna (Pali)
- Gokarna, Bangladesh, a village in Chittagong Division, Bangladesh
- Gokarneshwar, a municipality in Kathmandu District in central Nepal

== Religious ==
- Gokarna Aunsi, a late August or early September celebration in Nepal
- Gokarna Math, one of the 24 mathas of the Dvaita order
- Gokarnanatheshwara Temple, a temple in Mangaluru, India
- Gokarneshvara temple, Pudukkottai, a temple in Tamil Nadu, India
- Mahabaleshwar Temple, Gokarna, a temple located in Gokarna, Uttara Kannada district, Karnataka state, India
- Gokarneshwor Mahadev temple, Kathmandu Valley in Nepal

== Other uses ==
- Gokarna (film), a 2003 film produced in India

== See also ==
- Gokanna (disambiguation)
