= Indian Railway Stations Development Corporation =

Former special purpose vehicle

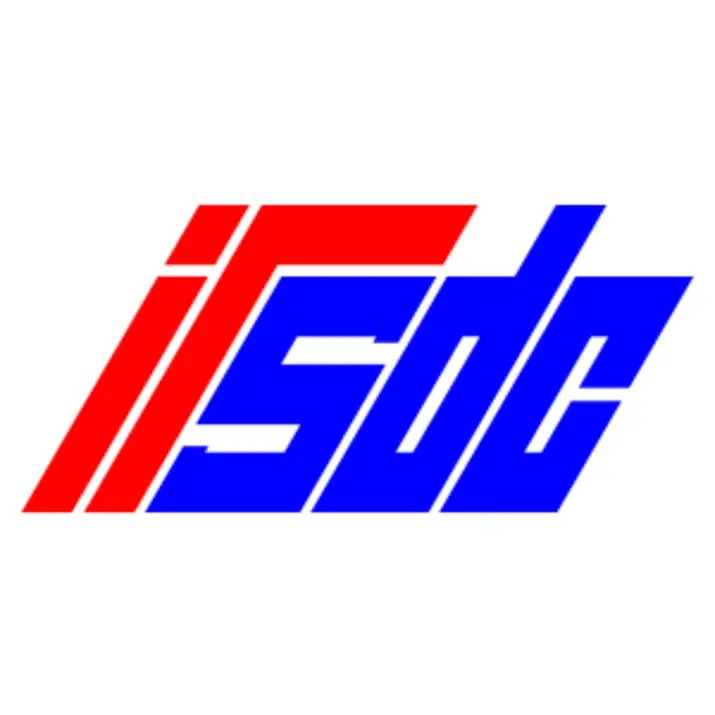
- Type: Special purpose vehicle
- Industry: Railway infrastructure
- Founded: 12 April 2012
- Defunct: 18 October 2021
- Fate: Dissolved
- Headquarters: Konnectus Building, Bhavbhuti Marg, New Delhi, India
- Area served: India
- Key people: Sanjeev Mittal (Chairman); S. K. Lohia (MD & CEO)
- Services: Railway Stations and Infrastructure Development
- Revenue: ▲₹4,929.29 lakh (US$5.1 million) (FY2020)
- Operating income: ▲₹428.66 lakh (US$450,000) (FY2020)
- Net income: ▲₹307.73 lakh (US$320,000) (FY2020)
- Total assets: ▲₹21,673.35 lakh (US$23 million) (FY2020)
- Total equity: ▲₹15,453.95 lakh (US$16 million) (FY2020)
- Owners: Govt. Of India- 100%
- Subsidiaries: Gandhi Nagar Railway and Urban Development Corporation; Surat Integrated Transportation Development Corporation Limited
- Website: irsdc.in

Indian Railway Stations Development Corporation Limited (IRSDC) was a special purpose vehicle owned by the Rail Land Development Authority (RLDA), Ircon International and RITES. All three companies are owned by the Indian Ministry of Railways. IRSDC was incorporated on 12 April 2012.

On 18 October 2021, as part of a measure to rationalise railway bodies, the Railway Board announced that it would shut down IRSDC, and transfer the stations under its management to the respective zonal railways.

== 'Special Power' ==
According to Section 11, Chapter 4, The Railways Act, 1989, IRSDC has the authority to develop stations for the designated mandated purposes under its purview without requiring to seek approvals from local authorities. The aforementioned section has a non-obstante clause, a legislative device that precludes all extant laws and supersedes them. Therefore, by virtue of this Act, the provisions of all other Acts except the 'land acquisition' Act stand muted, in so far as the intent and purpose of the said clause is concerned. This legal position has been established has stood the "pith and substance" test of Constitutional scrutiny and validity in multiple cases (Subhash Dutta vs. Union of India and Ors. 2001, Goa Foundation and another vs. Konkan Railway Corporation 1992, R. E. Marriott vs Municipality of Howrah, 1940, The Municipal Corporation of Bombay vs the Great Indian Peninsular Railways, UOI Vs. UPSEB, 2001 etc.).

According to the Original Indian Railways Permanent Way Manual (IRPWM) -

"Section 11 of the Indian Railways Act No.24 of 1989 and the Government Buildings Act No. IV of 1899 read in conjunction with Sec.291 of the Cantonments Act No. II of 1924 provide for the right to erect buildings on their own land by Railways without having to obtain sanction of the Municipal or Cantonment authorities in whose area the site is situated."

This facility in law available to IRSDC is of great essence, as the lack of it assails the capability of the private developers to secure approvals and execute the redevelopment efforts within strict timelines in order to maintain project IRRs. Nevertheless, in fairness of things, the IRPWM also states that -

"In urban areas, the Urban Development Authority must be consulted and rules framed by them followed. Municipal or Local authorities may, however, be consulted, where appropriate, regarding water connections, sewer lines and sewage disposal and similar matters."

== Projects ==
=== Anand Vihar railway station ===
As a part of the mandate, IRSDC seeks the participation of a private entity for the Redevelopment of Anand Vihar Railway Station including interalia all works related to, or incidental to, or required to be undertaken upon the project site in accordance with the provisions of the Development Agreement, and Applicable Laws, including the commercial development, redevelopment and station development, as required to be undertaken (the "Project") on Design, Build, Finance, Operate and Transfer (the "DBFOT") basis, and has decided to carry out the bidding process for selection of a private entity as the bidder to whom the Project may be awarded. Brief particulars of the Project are as follows:

Name of the Project	Indicative Project Cost (INR. bn.) (Cost excluding commercial development)
Redevelopment of Anand Vihar Railway Station	2 bn.

==== Anand Vihar RFQ ====
On 22 February 2016, the official Twitter page, LinkedIn page and the Facebook page of IRSDC reported, vide an official press release, that the RFQ applications for Anand Vihar had been received. The response, that included 13 applications as against 3 applications for Habibganj, was claimed to be "excellent". It was further reported that the interested parties included corporations such as Shapoorji Pallonji, L&T, Tata group, GMR, IL&FS, Mcnally Bharat, Bharti Realty, Essel group, Ahluwalia, IRB Infra, Supreme Infrastructure, Oriental Structure, Bhartiya group, MBL Infrastructure, ASF Infrastructure, Bansal Constructions etc. Additionally, it was intimated through the tweets and the Facebook post that the RFQ submission date for Bijwasan had been postponed to 1 March 2016 upon the request of bidders. the response for this station was described as "huge".

=== Bijwasan railway station ===
Bijwasan is an existing station on Delhi–Rewari line of Indian Railways network, proposed to be redeveloped as a world-class station in the National Capital Region of Delhi near Dwarka. The Request-for-Qualification document for the selection of the implementation agency has been issued by IRSDC for development of Bijwasan Station on DBFOT basis in accordance with the provisions of the development agreement, and local applicable Laws for commercial development, redevelopment and station development. Feasibility study and Master planning exercise has been carried out for development of Bijwasan railway station along with associated facilities and commercial development. Various approvals obtained during the master planning exercise shall be shared by IRSDC with the shortlisted bidders at the second stage i.e., RFP stage.

The developer shall develop the entire project including the station redevelopment and commercial development on preferably DBFOT format. The developer shall be responsible for station facility operations during development/redevelopment and for a fixed period post construction. After this the station operations shall revert to Indian Railways. The commercial area is envisaged to be operated by the developer for a concession period of 45 years (including construction period).

Other stations that would come online in short order are as follows:

=== Surat railway station / Surat Multi Modal Transportation Hub (MMTH) ===
On 16 November 2018, Press Information Bureau, Government of India reported the following in a press release about the decisions made on the planning of the redevelopment of the Surat MMTH:

A multi modal transport hub is to be developed at Surat Railway station. Three levels of government, namely central (railways), state (Gujarat State Road Transport Corporation) and local government (Surat Municipal Corporation) are to cooperate. Proposals were solicited in 2018

== Important Events in News ==
=== Excerpts from news reports ===
"Starting with five station, including two in Delhi, re-development and upgradation of railway stations across the country will be taken up under an agreement between Railway Land Development Authority (RLDA) with Indian Railway Station Development Corporation (IRSDC)."

"The Chandigarh Administration on Thursday gave green signal to development plans of the Indian Railway Station Development Corporation (IRSDC) to convert Chandigarh railway station into world-class facility."

"A senior Railway Ministry official said that the ₹8.5-lakh-crore railway infrastructure modernisation plan has been attracting a number of private companies. IRSDC has roped in one of the top global consulting firms to prepare a business plan for station modernisation."

"The railways has chalked out the parameters based on which it would select developers, and also explained the duties and responsibilities of developers. The developers have now been asked to send their suggestion by 15th January 2016 after which the railways would come out with a final document."
