= Sonprayag =

- Location in Uttarakhand, India Sonprayag (India)
- Coordinates: 30°37′57″N 78°57′36″E
- Country: India
- State: Uttarakhand
- District: Rudraprayag district

Population (2011)
  - Total: 805

Languages
  - Official: Hindi
- Time zone: UTC+5:30 (IST)
- Vehicle registration: UK10
- Website: uk.gov.in

Sonprayag is a village in the Rudraprayag district of Uttarakhand state in India. Approximately 73 Kilometres from Rudraprayag Town, the district headquarter. Situated on the banks of river Mandakini River, it is a proposed Y-forked railway junction on Chota Char Dham Railway for two different railways going to Kedarnath and Badrinath.

== Geography ==
Nearby are Kedarnath and Badrinath, the holiest places of Hinduism called Chota Char Dham.

== Transport ==
It is a terminating junction on the Karanprayag-Saikot-Sonprayag Kedarnath Railway route of Chota Char Dham Railway.

== Demographics ==
As of 2001 India census, village has a small population.
