= Gokanna =

Gokhana, Gokaṇṇa, Gokana or Gokhana may refer to:

- Trincomalee (Pali: Gokaṇṇa; Sanskrit: Gokarna), city in Sri Lanka
- Gokana kingdom, also Gokhana, an Ogoni kingdom, now local government area, in Rivers State, Nigeria
- Gokana language, the eastern Ogoni language
- Gokana, Nigeria, a Local Government Area

== See also ==
- Gokarna (disambiguation)
- Gokhan, a Turkish name
