= Palar, India =

Palar
- Location in Uttarakhand, India Palar (India)
- Coordinates: 30.835°N 78.246°E
- Country: India
- State: Uttarakhand
- District: Uttarkashi

Population (2011)
  - Total: 648

Languages
  - Official: Hindi
- Time zone: UTC+5:30 (IST)
- Vehicle registration: UK10
- Website: uk.gov.in

Palar (Hindi: पालर), is a village in Uttarkashi district of Uttarakhand state in India. Situated on the banks of Yamuna river and the terminating railway station on the Uttarkashi-Palar Yamunotri Railway route of Chota Char Dham Railway nearest to Yamunotri.

== Geography ==
It is located close to Yamunotri.

Near the RAAJGARHI. PALAR is a village in district Uttarkashi of UTTARAKHAND situated on the bank of the river Yamuna and Kedar Ganga, which originated from the mountain Kedar Kantha. The village is the central point of beauty of the area. The village is known for its Prosperity. The village is also selected for the terminating station for the railway line between Uttarkashi to Yamunotri.

== Demographics ==
As of 2001 India census, village has 135 families with a total population of 648.

=== Adventure sports ===
- White water rafting
- Trekking tracks
- Mountaineering

== See also ==
- 1991 Uttarkashi earthquake
