= Gokarnamatam =

- Village
- Interactive map of Gokarnamatam
- Location in Andhra Pradesh, India
- Coordinates: 15.909267°N 80.647952°E
- Country: India
- State: Andhra Pradesh
- Districts: Bapatla

Languages
  - Official: Telugu
- Time zone: UTC+5:30 (IST)

Gokarnamatam is a village in Nizampatnam mandal, located in Bapatla district of Andhra Pradesh, India. It is a coastal area with a sea harbor nearby. The occupation of the people is mainly agriculture and fishing.
