= Rail Land Development Authority =

Authority developing land for Indian railways

Rail Land Development Authority (RLDA) is a statutory authority, under the Indian Ministry of Railways, set-up by an Amendment to the Railways Act, 1989. It is responsible for creating assets for Indian Railways through the development of vacant railway land for commercial use to generate revenue by non-tariff measures. RLDA's mission is to be a leader in creating value through the redevelopment of land and air spaces – residential, commercial, and transportation hubs. RLDA's expenses are covered through grants provided by Indian Railways. RLDA transfers the total earnings generated from the development of railway land to Indian Railways. The Indian Planning Commission has computed an approximate budget of around Rs 20 to 272 billion for the development of infrastructure nationally during the 11th plan period. Out of this budget, the Railways has an anticipated requirement of Rs 2800 billion. 83% of this requirement is supposed to be met through public sector investment. In order to generate the remaining investment required to meet the budget mentioned above, the Indian Railways set up the Rail Land Development Authority on 1 November 2006. Manoj Garg, a 1992 batch IRSE officer, is Vice Chairman of RLDA. He joined RLDA on June 23, 2024, in a look-after charge capacity.

Currently, RLDA is working on four types of projects:

- Commercial Projects
- Multi-functional Complex
- Colony Redevelopment
- Station development

== Purpose ==
Indian Railways own approximately 43,000 hectares of vacant land. The land which is not required for operational purposes in the foreseeable future will be identified by the zonal railways and the details will be advised to the Railway Board. Such plots of land would then be handed over to the RLDA by the Railway Board in phases for commercial development.

Commercial / Residential Sites

A total of 21 Commercial Sites leased out for 45/99 years to various Developers with Realized/Expected revenue of approximately Rs. 1700 crores for Railways. Upfront lease premium model through transparent E-bidding system is adopted. Approximately 55 more sites having an approximate value of Rs. 7500 crores available for lease PAN India.

Some major Commercial sites which have been leased out are as follows:-

- Ashok Vihar – The total earnings to Railways is Rs. 1359 Cr. against a reserve price of Rs. 1280 Crore. This is the major achievement of RLDA in the Current Year and the land use of this site is "residential" and selected Developer M/s Godrej Properties will be developing this property for Smart and Healthy Living Places catering to a demand of mid and premium segment housing.
- Other Major sites which have been leased out are Padi (Chennai) for a leased value of Rs. 43.0 Cr., Hazari Bagh (Ajmer) for a leased value of Rs. 47.88 Cr., Aish Bagh (Lucknow) for a leased value of Rs. 57.67 Cr., Gwaltoli (Kanpur) for a leased value of Rs. 66.70 Cr. Jhansi (E) for a leased value of Rs. 30.66 Cr., Ayanavaram Part C for Rs 28 Cr, Amritsar Fo a lease Period of Rs. 15.07Cr etc.

Re-Development of Railway Colonies

- At present 84 Railway Colonies entrusted to RLDA for Re-development.
- Approximately 25000 Staff Quarters to be Re-Constructed
- Efficient Utilization of FSI/FAR to generate space.
- The entire cost to be met by leveraging commercial development of released Railway Land/Airspace
- Upfront Lease Premium Model + Re-development of Railway Quarters

Re-development of Railway Stations

- A total of 51 Railway Stations in PAN India are being re-developed by RLDA on PPP Model, on Self Sustainable Model in synergy with Smart City Projects launched by Government of India. Entire cost of re-development to be met by leveraging commercial development of spare railway land/airspace in and around the station.

Multi-Functional Complex (MFC) Sites

- A total of 52 MFCs leased out for 45 years to various developers
- Revenue generation of approximately Rs. 500 Crore to Railways
- MFCs provide multiple facilities like shopping, food stalls/restaurants, Book stalls, ATMs, Medicines and Budget Hotels, parking spaces and other similar amenities for rail users at Railway Stations

== Details of leased out RLDA's commercial sites ==
=== Financial Year 2019 – 2020 ===
S.No.	Name of Site	State	Leased Amount (Rs. in Crore) Up to 10 March
1	Ashok Vihar	Delhi	1359.0
2	Gwaltoli (Kanpur )	Uttar Pradesh	67.0
3	Aish Bagh	Uttar Pradesh	54.0
4	Vishakhapatnam	Andhra Pradesh	11.0
5	Vijayawada	Andhra Pradesh	6.0
6	Nizamabad	Telangana	5.0
7	Etawah	Uttar Pradesh	5.0
8	Ayanavaram Chennai	Tamil Nadu	28.0
9	Amritsar	Punjab	15.0

=== Financial year 2018–19 ===
S.No.	Name of the Site	State	Leased Amount (In Crore)
1	Hazari Bagh	Rajasthan	48.0
2	Jhansi (E)	Uttar Pradesh	31.0
3	Kampu Kothi	Madhya Pradesh	14.0
4	Sawai Madhopur	Rajasthan	14.0
5	Shimla	Himachal Pradesh	12.0
6	Villupuram	Tamil Nadu	9.0
7	Johns Ganj	Rajasthan	9.0
8	Waltax Road	Tamil Nadu	4.0

=== Financial year 2017 – 2018 ===
S.No.	Name of Site	State	Leased Amount (In Cr.)
1	Padi	Tamil Nadu	43.0
2	Raxual	Bihar	7.0
3	Bandra East (II)	Maharashtra	7.0
4	Gaya	Bihar	2.0

== Milestones achieved ==
- RLDA has broken all previous records of earnings as well as those of awarding of lease contracts in 2019-20.
- RLDA has awarded tenders for long lease of land parcels worth Rs 1550 crores during the year which is its highest ever performance so far.
- Total Earning of RLDA during the year 2019-20 has been Rs 931 crores as against Rs 31 CR, 18 CR, 43 CR and 83 CR in the previous four years.
