= Diamond Quadrilateral =

Indian railway project

Overview
- Status: Active
- Owner: Indian Railways
- Locale: (bold indicates states containing upcoming major high-speed rail terminals): Delhi; (New Delhi): Maharashtra; (Mumbai): West Bengal; (Kolkata): Tamil Nadu; (Chennai): Karnataka; (Bengaluru): Telangana; (Hyderabad): Gujarat; (Ahmedabad): Andhra Pradesh; (Visakhapatnam): Uttar Pradesh; (Varanasi): Bihar; (Patna): Odisha; (Bhubaneswar): Rajasthan; (Jaipur): Jharkhand; (Ranchi): Punjab; (Amritsar): Haryana; (Gurugram): Madhya pradesh; (Bhopal): Kerala; (Thiruvananthapuram): Chhattisgarh; (Raipur): Jammu and Kashmir; (Jammu): Assam; (Guwahati)

Service
- Type: High-speed rail

Technical
- Track gauge: 1435 mm
- Electrification: 25 kV AC overhead lines
- Operating speed: 320 km/h (200 mph)
Route map

The Diamond Quadrilateral is a project of the Indian Railways to establish a high-speed rail network in India. The Diamond Quadrilateral will connect the four mega cities of India, viz. Delhi, Mumbai, Kolkata and Chennai, similar to the Golden Quadrilateral Highway system.

The High-speed train on the Mumbai-Ahmedabad section will be the first high-speed train corridor to be implemented in the country. On 9 June 2014, then President of India, Pranab Mukherjee, officially declared that the Government of India led by Prime Minister Narendra Modi will launch a Diamond Quadrilateral project of high-speed trains.

== History ==
Prior to the 2014 general election, the two major national parties (Bharatiya Janata Party and Indian National Congress) pledged to introduce high-speed rail. The INC pledged to connect all of India's million-plus cities by high-speed rail, whereas BJP, which won the election, promised to build the "Diamond Quadrilateral" project, which would connect the cities of Chennai, Delhi, Kolkata, and Mumbai via high-speed rail. This project was approved as a priority for the new government in the incoming president's speech. Construction of one kilometer of high speed railway track will cost ₹100 crore (US$10 million) – ₹140 crore (US$15 million) which is 10-14 times higher than the cost of construction of standard railway.

India's Union Council of Ministers passed the proposal of Japan to build India's first high-speed railway on 10 December 2015. The railway will run approximately 500 km (310 mi) between Mumbai and the western city of Ahmedabad at a top speed of 320 km/h (200 mph). Under this proposal, the construction was supposed to begin in 2017, but was postponed due to the COVID-19 Pandemic and construction started only in 2021. The Gujarat side of the project is mostly complete and is expected to open in 2027 whereas the full line to Mumbai is expected to be completed in the year 2028. The estimated cost of this project is ₹980 billion (US$10 billion) and is financed by a low-interest loan from Japan. It will transport the passengers from Ahmedabad to Mumbai in just 3 hours and its ticket fare will be cheaper than air planes, that is, ₹2,500-₹3,000.

== Current status ==
National Rail Plan's (NRP) proposed routes of high-speed rail corridors.

As of July 2020, NHSRCL has floated almost 60% of tenders for civil works, and almost 60% of land is acquired for the first Mumbai-Ahmedabad corridor and the deadline of the full project is 2028. The National High Speed Rail Corporation Limited, the implementing body of the project, has planned 7 routes which are Delhi to Varanasi via Noida, Agra and Lucknow; Varanasi to Howrah via Patna; Delhi to Ahmadabad via Jaipur and Udaipur; Delhi to Amritsar via Chandigarh, Ludhiana and Jalandhar; Mumbai to Nagpur via Nasik; Mumbai to Hyderabad via Pune and Chennai to Mysore via Bangalore. According to reports, the NHAI will soon acquire land to lay tracks for high-speed trains along greenfield expressways for integrated development of the rail transport network in the country. to expedite the project, the Indian Railways along with the National Highways Authority of India (NHAI) will begin the process of acquiring additional land.

The decision to acquire additional land was taken during a recent meeting of a group of infrastructure ministers led by Union Minister Nitin Gadkari. During the infra sector group meeting, it was decided that the NHAI will take over land acquisition and a 4-member committee was constituted to take this process forward.

The four-member task force will work out the modalities for acquiring land and sharing the cost. It may be noted that the Indian Railways is in the process of preparing the blueprint of 7 high-speed rail routes in the country.

As per reports, The railway board has also written to the NHAI and given details of seven high-speed rail corridors for running bullet trains for which the detailed project reports are being prepared.

NHAI has been asked to depute a nodal officer for this purpose for better integration of the mammoth planning exercise. Railways plans to run bullet trains on 7 important new routes of the country.

== See also ==
- Targeted projects
  - Bharatmala, India's project to connect all district headquarters with highways
  - Golden Quadrilateral, India's project to connect major cities of India forming a quadrilateral
  - Parvatmala, India's project for nation-wide cable car transportation
  - Sagar Mala, India's project to modernise and connect all shipping ports
  - Setu Bharatam, India's project to make all national highways railway crossings free
  - UDAN, India's project for regional civil aviation connectivity
  - Make in India
  - PM Gati Shakti
- Transport in India
  - Future of rail transport in India
  - Expressways of India
  - List of national highways in India
  - Indian Human Spaceflight Programme
  - Multi-Modal Logistics Parks in India
  - RORO ferries in India
