= Karnaprayag =

- Town
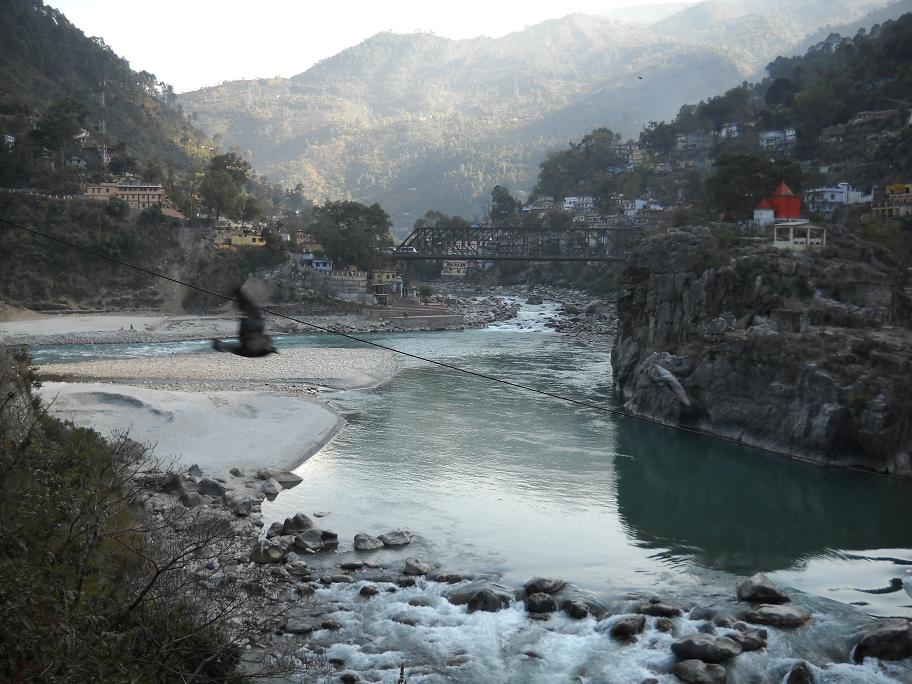
- The Alaknanda River flowing in from the left meets the Pindar River (center background) to flow on as the Alaknanda again (foreground) at Karnaprayag

- Location in Uttarakhand, India Karnaprayag (India)
- Coordinates: 30.259°N 79.218°E
- Country: India
- State: Uttarakhand
- District: Chamoli
- Tehsil: Karnaprayag
- Elevation: 860 m (2,820 ft)

Population (2001)
  - Total: 6,976

Languages
  - Official: Hindi
- Time zone: UTC+5:30 (IST)
- PIN: 246444
- Vehicle registration: UK-11
- Website: uk.gov.in

Karnaprayag is a town and municipal board in the Chamoli District in the Indian state of Uttarakhand. Karnaprayag is one of the Panch Prayag (five confluences) of Alaknanda River, situated at the confluence of the Alaknanda and Pindar River.

== Demographics ==
As of the 2001 census, Karnaprayag had a population of 6,976. Males constitute 56% of the population, and females make up 44%. Karnaprayag has an average literacy rate of 76%, higher than the national average of 59.5%. Male literacy is 81%, and female literacy is 69%. 13% of the population is under six years of age.

== Geography ==
Karnaprayag is located at 30.27°N 79.25°E. It has an average elevation of 860 metres (2,820 feet). The confluence of the Pindar River, which arises from the icy Pindari glacier and the Alaknanda, occurs at Karnaprayag.

== Overview ==
Karnaprayag is one of five sites where the confluence of rivers occurs. The five prayags are Vishnuprayag, Nandprayag, Karnaprayag, Rudraprayag, and Devprayag. Allahabad(Prayagraj), where the Ganges, Yamuna, and mythical Saraswati join, is known as Prayag and is one of the holy places of Hindu pilgrimage. Karnaprayag is believed by many to be the place where Karna of the Mahabharata, was to have worshipped the Sun God. There is an ancient temple devoted to Uma in Karnaprayag. In some versions, Karnaprayag is the place where Lord Krishna did the cremation of Karna.

It is on the way to Badrinath, on the confluence of two holy rivers,Alaknanda and Pindar. It is said that Karna of Mahabharata meditated here for many years to acquire the impregnable shield, which made him a formidable warrior in the battlefield. Swami Vivekananda meditated here for eighteen days with his Guru Bhai, Guru Turianand ji and Akharanand ji. It is the sub-divisional headquarters of district Chamoli. Roads from here go to Almora, Nainital, and Jim Corbett National Park.

== How to reach ==
=== Air ===
The nearest airport is the Jolly Grant Airport near Dehradun 212 km (132 mi) away.

=== Railway ===
The nearest railway station is at Rishikesh. However, Rishikesh is a small railway station not connected by fast trains. Haridwar railway junction, 24 km farther from Rishikesh, has train connections to most of the major cities in India and is, therefore, the railhead for Karnaprayag.

A new railway line, connecting Rishikesh with Karnaprayag is under construction.

=== Road ===
Karnaprayag lies on national highway NH58 that connects Delhi with Badrinath and Mana Pass in Uttarakhand near Indo-Tibet border. Therefore, all the buses and vehicles that carry pilgrims from New Delhi to Badrinath via Haridwar and Rishikesh in pilgrim season of summer months pass through Karnaprayag on the way to Joshimath and further north. Rishikesh is the major starting point for the road journey to Karnaprayag, and regular buses operate from Rishikesh bus station to Karnaprayag. The road distance from Rishikesh to Karnaprayag is 172 km (107 mi) via Rudraprayag and Srinagar (Uttarakhand).

== Gallery ==
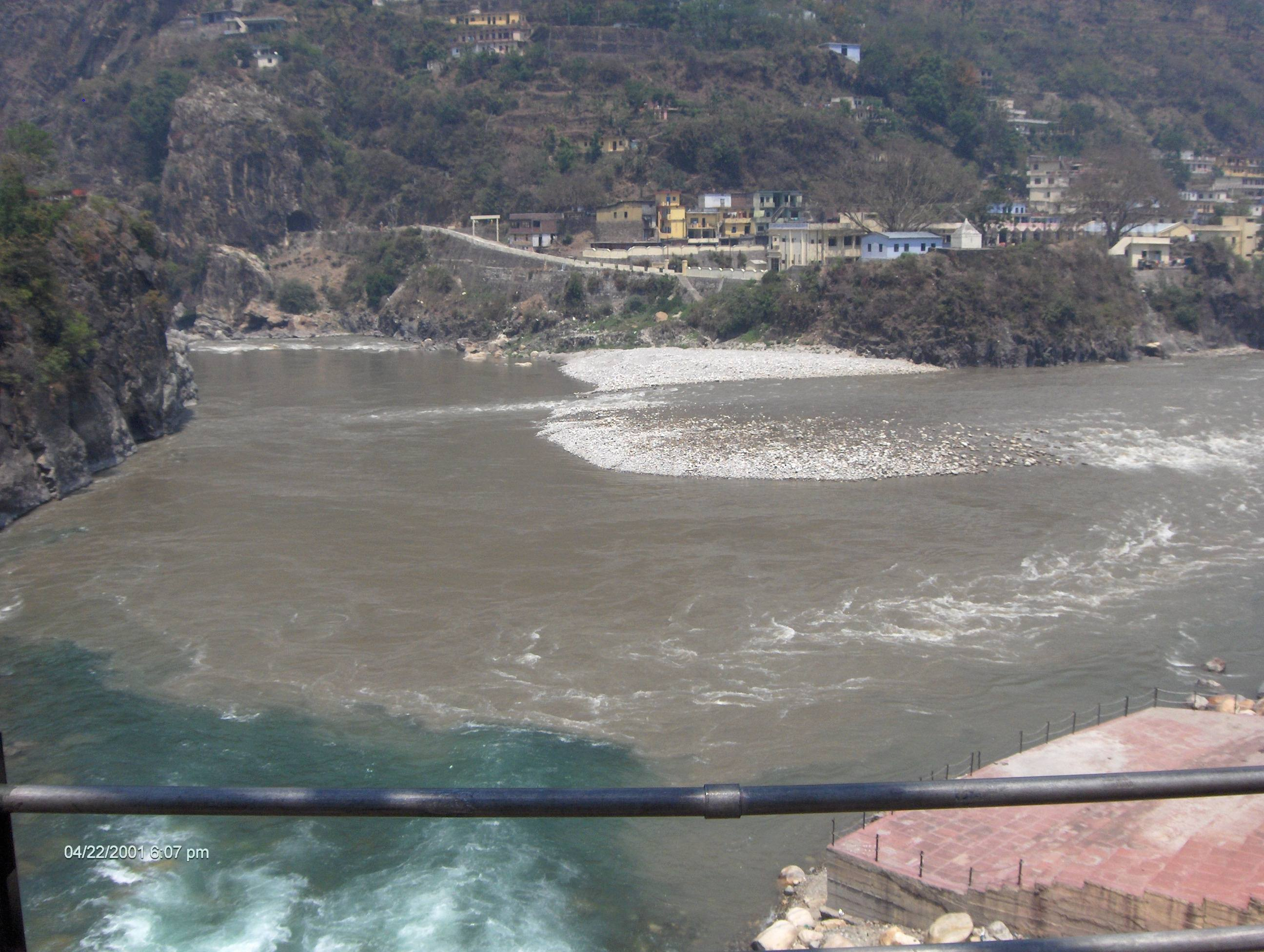
The Alaknanda (from right) is joined by Pindar river (from bottom) at Karnaprayag at a height of 788 m (2,600 ft.)

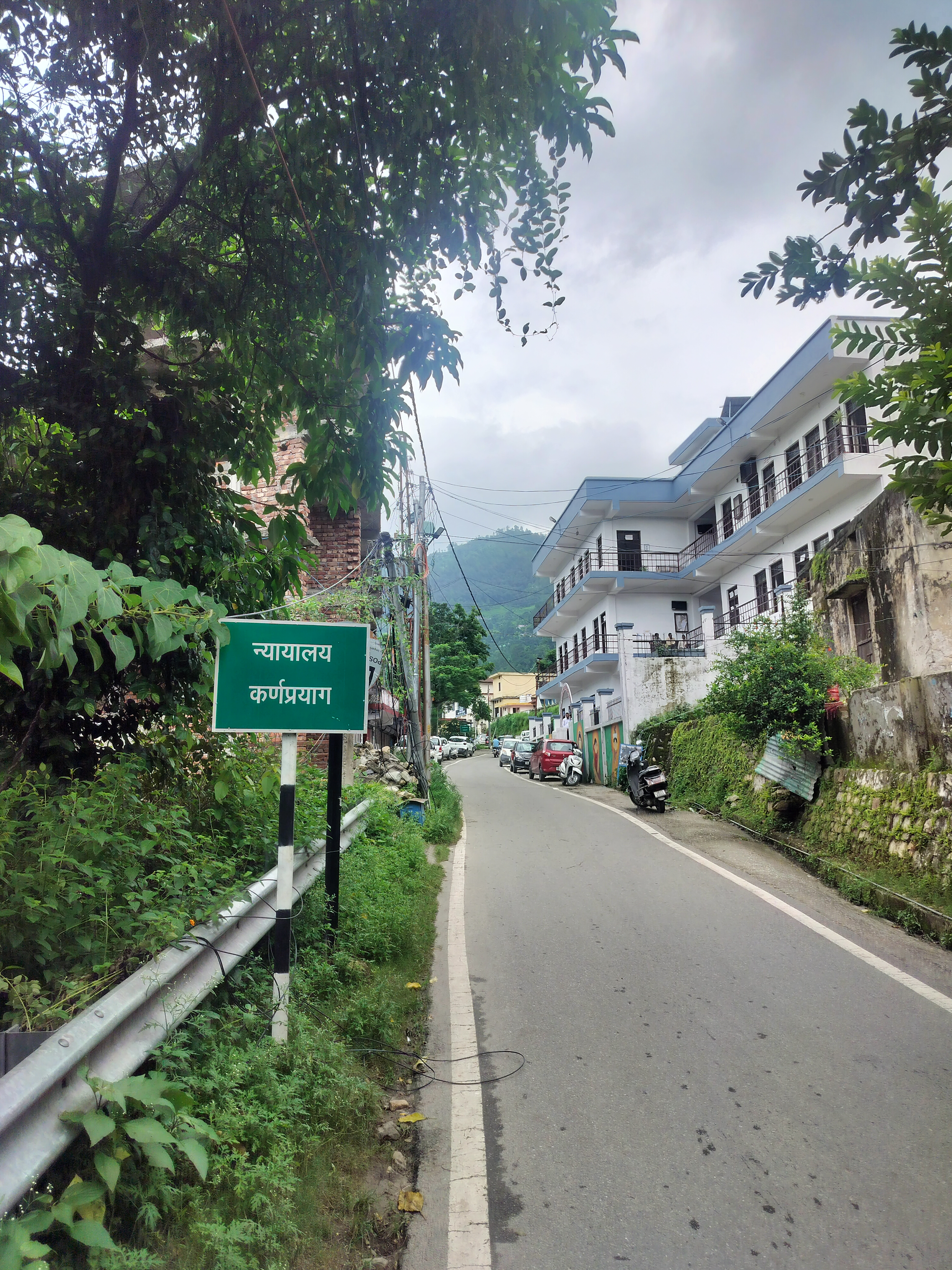
Court,Karanprayag

== See also ==
- Badhangarhi temple
