= Setu Bharatam =

Bridge in India

- Country: India
- Prime Minister(s): Narendra Modi
- Launched: 4 March 2016; 10 years ago

Setu Bharatam was launched by Prime Minister Narendra Modi on 4 March 2016 at a budget of ₹102 billion (US$1.1 billion), with an aim to make all national highways free of railway crossings by 2019.

== Project details ==
Under the project, as many as 208 rails over and under bridges (ROBs/RUBs) would be constructed at unstaffed railway crossings on national highways and 1,500 dilapidated British-era bridges would be widened, rehabilitated or replaced in a phased manner at a cost of ₹208 billion (US$2.2 billion) and ₹300 billion (US$3.1 billion), respectively.

The Setu Bharatam programme aims to make all national highways free of railway level crossings by 2019. This is being done to prevent frequent accidents and loss of lives at level crossings. 208 Railway Over Bridges (ROB)/Railway Under Bridges (RUB) will be built at the level crossings at a cost of ₹20,800 crore as part of the programme.

The details of 208 Railway Over Bridges are as follows:

- Andhra Pradesh – 33,
- Assam – 12,
- Bihar – 20,
- Chhattisgarh – 5,
- Gujarat – 8,
- Haryana – 10,
- Himachal Pradesh – 5,
- Jharkhand – 11,
- Karnataka – 17,
- Kerala – 4,
- Madhya Pradesh -6,
- Maharashtra – 12,
- Odisha – 4,
- Punjab – 10,
- Rajasthan – 9,
- Tamil Nadu – 9,
- Uttarakhand – 2,
- Uttar Pradesh – 9,
- West Bengal – 22

The detailed Project Reports have already been received for 73 ROBs, and of these, 64 ROBs are expected to be sanctioned with an estimated cost of ₹5600 crore. More than 1500 old and worn-down bridges will also be improved by replacement/widening/strengthening in a phased manner at a cost of about ₹30,000 crore.

The Ministry of Road Transport & Highways has also established an Indian Bridge Management System (IBMS) at the Indian Academy for Highway Engineers in Noida, U.P. The aim is to carry out a condition survey and inventory of all bridges on National Highways in India by using Mobile Inspection Units. 11 consultancy firms have been appointed for this purpose. Inventorization of 50,000 bridges has been done. The first cycle of the survey is expected to be completed by June 2016.

== See also ==
- Targeted projects
  - Bharatmala, India's project to connect all district headquarters with highways
  - Golden Quadrilateral, India's project to connect major cities of India forming a quadrilateral
  - Parvatmala, India's project for nation-wide cable car transportation
  - Sagar Mala, India's project to modernise and connect all shipping ports
  - UDAN, India's project for regional civil aviation connectivity
- Transport in India
  - Future of rail transport in India
  - Expressways of India
  - List of national highways in India
  - Indian Human Spaceflight Programme
