= Golden Quadrilateral =

National highway network in India connecting four megacities

- Highway map of India with the Golden Quadrilateral highlighted

Route information
- Maintained by NHAI
- Length: 5,846 km (3,633 mi)
- Existed: 2001–present

NH-16
- Length: 1,684 km (1,046 mi)
- From: Chennai
- To: Kolkata

NH-19 and NH-44
- Length: 1,453 km (903 mi)
- From: Kolkata
- To: Delhi

NH-48
- Length: 1,419 km (882 mi)
- From: Delhi
- To: Mumbai

NH-48
- Length: 1,290 km (800 mi)
- From: Mumbai
- To: Chennai

Location
- Country: India

Highway system
- Roads in India; Expressways; National; State; Asian

The Golden Quadrilateral (Hindi: Svarnim Chaturbhuj; abbreviated GQ) is a network of national highways connecting four major cities of India. It roughly forms a quadrilateral with major cities – Delhi (north), Kolkata (east), Mumbai (west) and Chennai (south) forming the termini. Stretching 5,846 km (3,633 mi), it is one of the longest roads in the world.

The project was part of the first phase of the National Highways Development Project executed by the Government of India. The roads were constructed and are maintained by the National Highway Authority of India under the purview of the Ministry of Road Transport and Highways. The road system consists of access controlled four or six-lane highways, built at a cost of ₹324.9 billion (equivalent to ₹1.5 trillion or US$16 billion in 2026). The project was launched in 1999, and completed in 2012.

== Background and planning ==
In 1998, the Government of India launched the National Highways Development Project (NHDP). The project envisaged the development of about 13,150 km (8,170 mi) of four and six lane highways at an estimated cost of ₹540 billion (equivalent to ₹2.5 trillion or US$27 billion in 2026). The Golden Quadrilateral project was part of the first phase of NHDP, and involved the construction of 5,846 km (3,633 mi) of multi-lane highways connecting the major cities. It was intended to establish better and faster transport networks between major cities, thereby reducing accidents and costs, and drive economical growth by providing better access to markets.

== Construction ==
National Highways Authority of India (NHAI) was tasked with the implementation of the project. The foundation stone for the project was laid on 6 January 1999 by then prime minister Atal Bihari Vajpayee. As per the original plan, majority of the project was intended to be completed by December 2004. However, as of July 2005, four laning of only 4,944 km (3,072 mi) was complete, and the project timeline was revised to be completed by December 2006.

The project faced further delays due to land acquisition issues, disputes with contractors, and renegotiation of contracts. A NHAI engineer Satyendra Dubey wrote letter to the prime minister highlighting that the large contractors were being given inside information by NHAI officials, and the contractors were subcontracting the work to smaller companies which lacked technical expertise. While Dubey was transferred and was later murdered for voicing out his concerns, NHAI implemented reforms in contract procedures due to the allegations.

In September 2009, the government announced plans to convert the existing four-lane highways into six-lane highways in the future. As per an update given to the Parliament of India, about 99.7% of the project was complete by 2009. In January 2012, the government announced that the entire project has been completed. The final cost of the project was estimated at ₹324.92 billion (equivalent to ₹1.5 trillion or US$16 billion in 2026).

== Network ==
The Golden Quadrilateral consists 5,846 km (3,633 mi) of multi-lane highways roughly forming a quadrilateral connecting four major cities – Delhi (north), Kolkata (east), Mumbai (west) and Chennai (south).

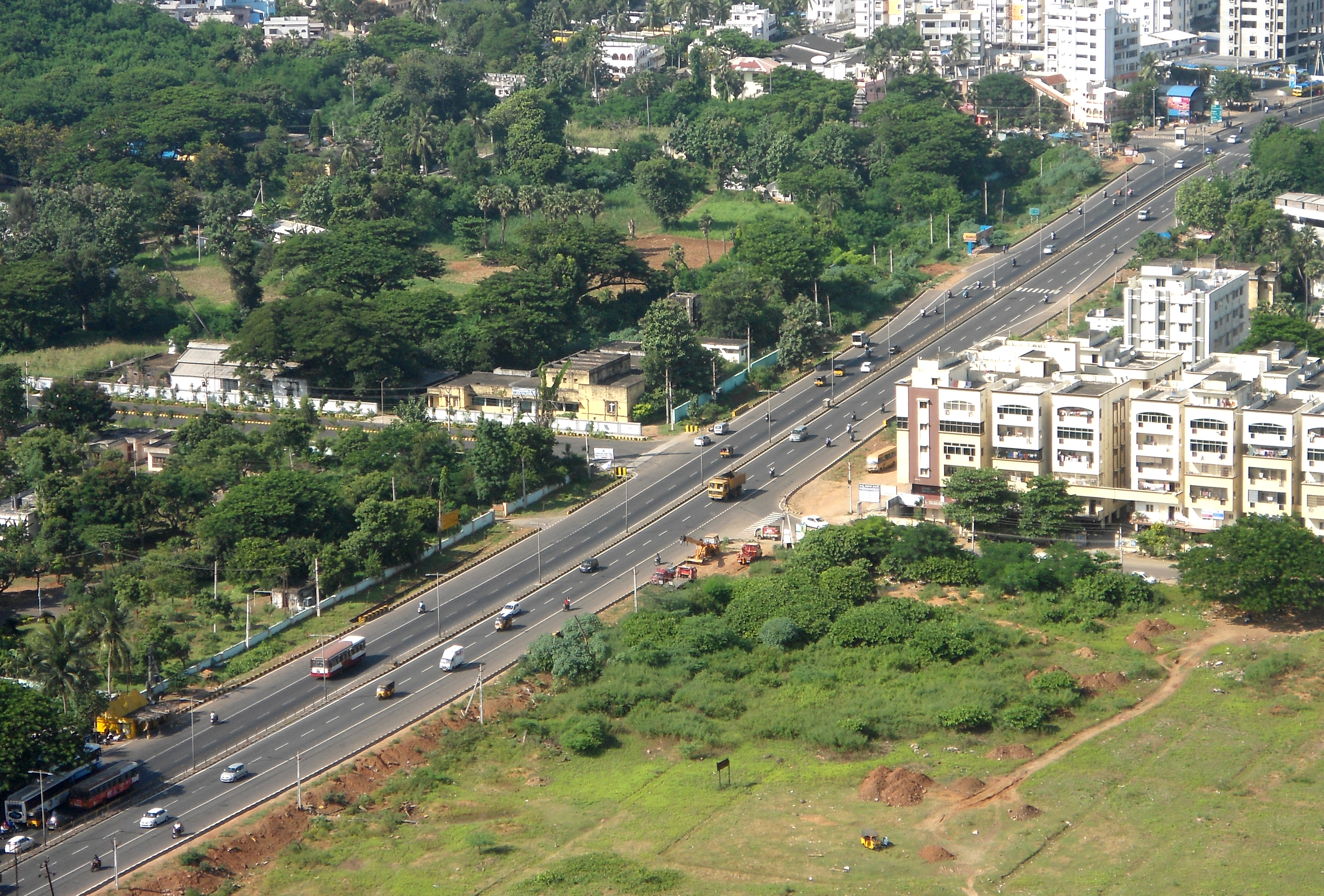
A section of NH-16 between Chennai and Kolkata at Visakhapatnam.

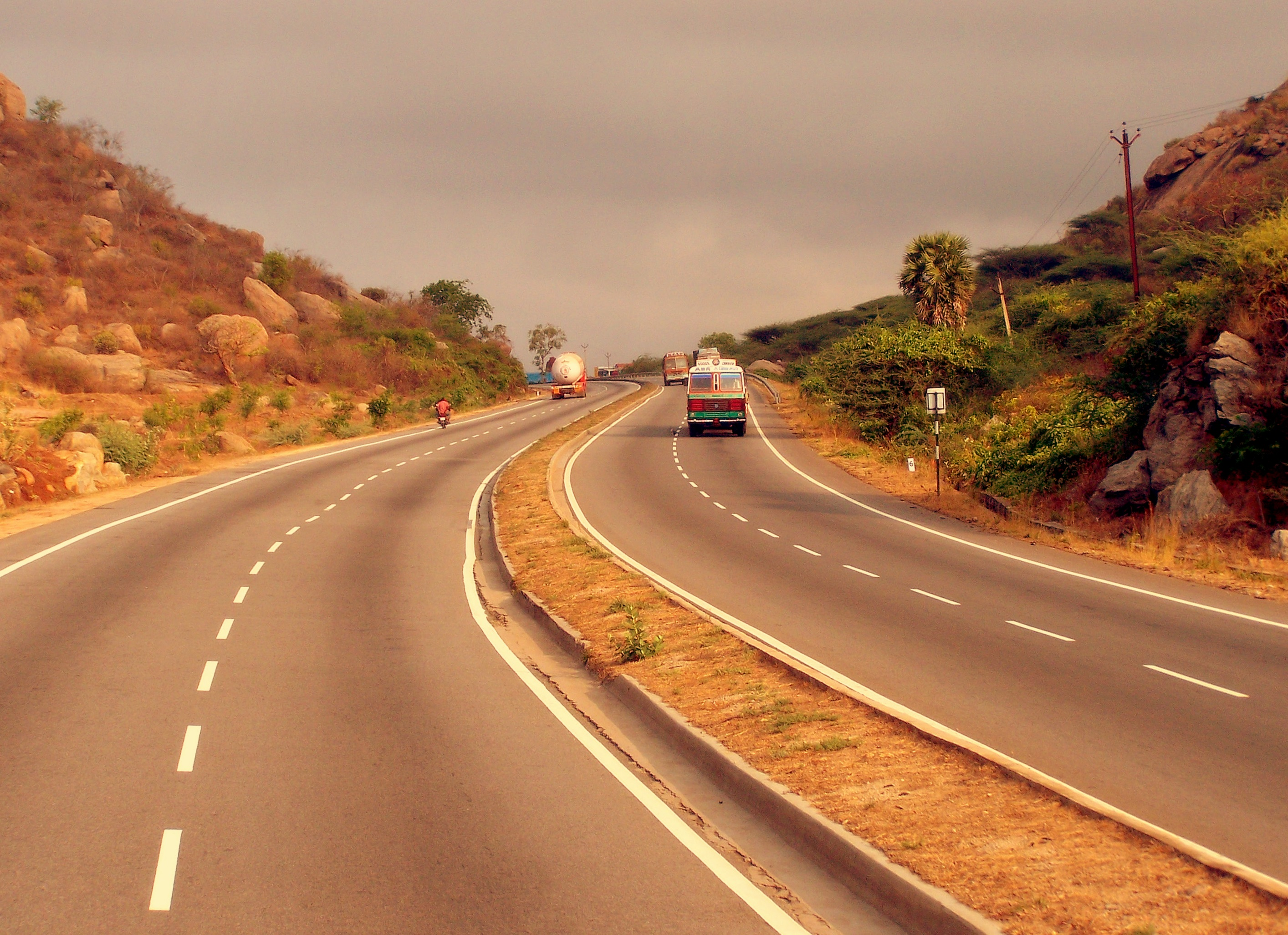
A section of the highway between Chennai and Mumbai

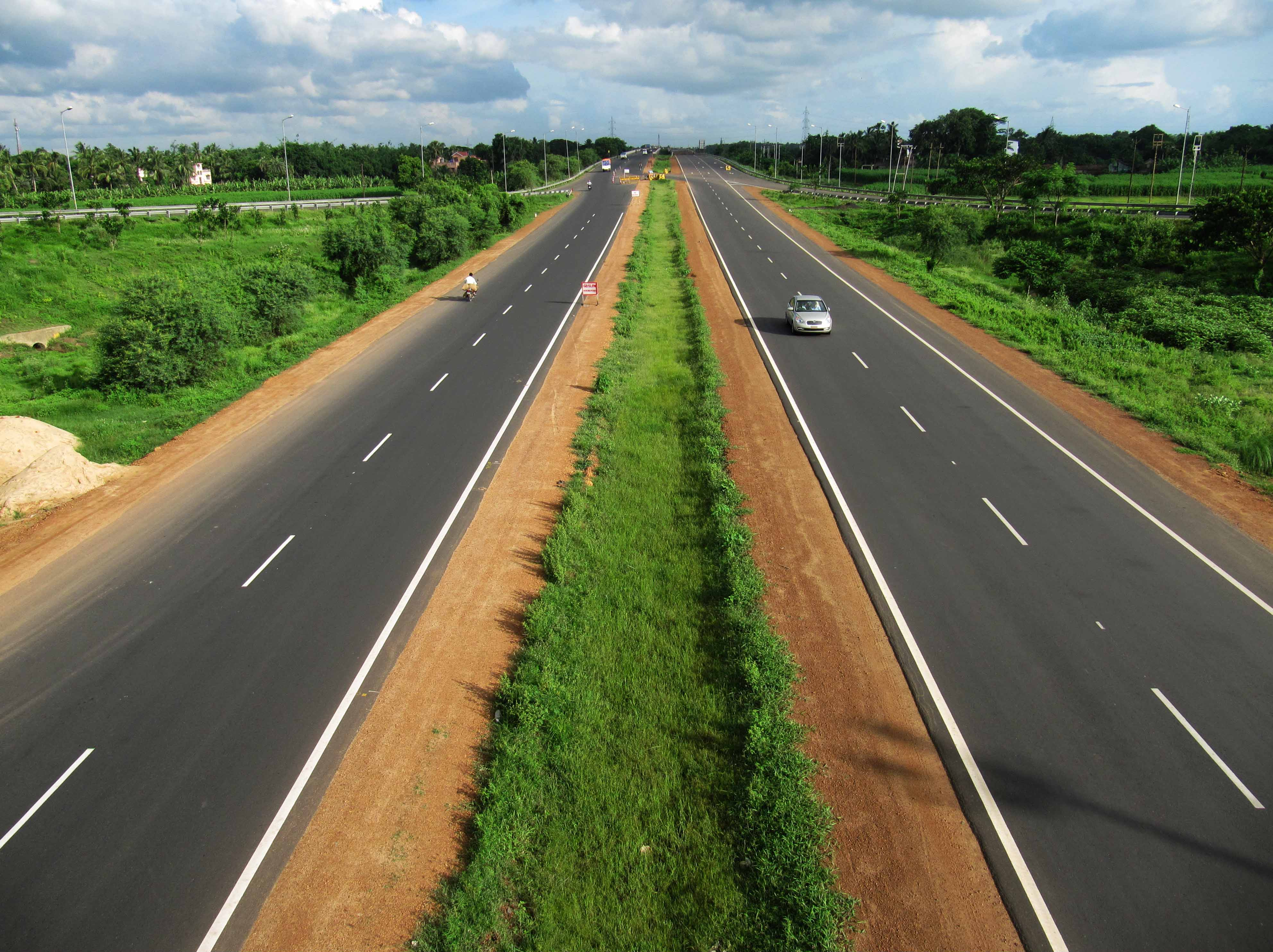
Part of the Delhi-Kolkata section of NH-19.

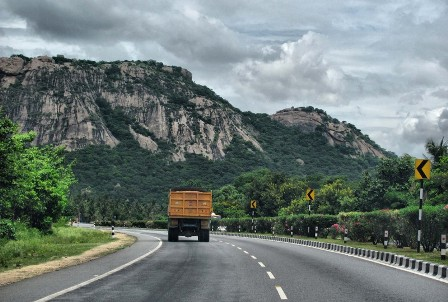
A section of the highway between Chennai and Mumbai

Segment	Length	National Highway	States/UTs
Delhi–Mumbai	1,419 km (882 mi)	NH-48	Gujarat – 488.7 km (303.7 mi); Haryana – 83.3 km (51.8 mi); Maharashtra – 104.2 km (64.7 mi); National Capital Territory – 10.8 km (6.7 mi); Rajasthan – 732 km (455 mi)
Mumbai–Chennai	1,290 km (800 mi)	NH-48	Karnataka – 575.7 km (357.7 mi); Maharashtra – 476.7 km (296.2 mi); Tamil Nadu – 237.6 km (147.6 mi)
Kolkata–Chennai	1,684 km (1,046 mi)	NH-16	Andhra Pradesh – 1,024.1 km (636.3 mi); Odisha – 444 km (276 mi); Tamil Nadu – 41.8 km (26.0 mi); West Bengal – 174.1 km (108.2 mi)
Delhi–Kolkata	1,453 km (903 mi)	NH-19 and NH-44	Bihar – 206 km (128 mi); Jharkhand – 199.8 km (124.1 mi); National Capital Territory – 15 km (9.3 mi); Uttar Pradesh – 823.5 km (511.7 mi); West Bengal – 208.7 km (129.7 mi)
	5,846 km (3,633 mi)		

=== Major towns ===
Major towns
Segment	State/UT				
Delhi–Mumbai	Gujarat	Haryana	Maharashtra	National Capital Territory	Rajasthan
Delhi–Mumbai	Ahmedabad; Ankleshwar; Vadodara	Bawal	Mumbai; Thane	Delhi	Bhilwara; Chittaurgarh; Jaipur; Kishangarh; Udaipur
Mumbai–Chennai	Karnataka	Maharashtra	Tamil Nadu		
Mumbai–Chennai	Belagavi; Bengaluru; Chitradurga	Kohlapur; Pune; Solapur	Chennai; Krishnagiri; Vellore		
Kolkata–Chennai	Andhra Pradesh	Odisha	Tamil Nadu	West Bengal	
Kolkata–Chennai	Anakapalli; Anandapuram; Pendurthi; Nellore; Rajahmundry; Vijayawada	Baleshwar; Bhubaneshwar	Chennai	Kharagpur; Kolkata	
Delhi–Kolkata	Bihar	Jharkhand	National Capital Territory	Uttar Pradesh	West Bengal
Delhi–Kolkata	Aurangabad; Dobhi; Mohania	Barhi; Bagodar; Gobindpur	Delhi	Agra; Kanpur; Prayagraj; Varanasi	Asansol; Kolkata; Palsit

== See also ==
- Bharatmala
- Sagar Mala project
- UDAN
