= Aerial lifts in India =

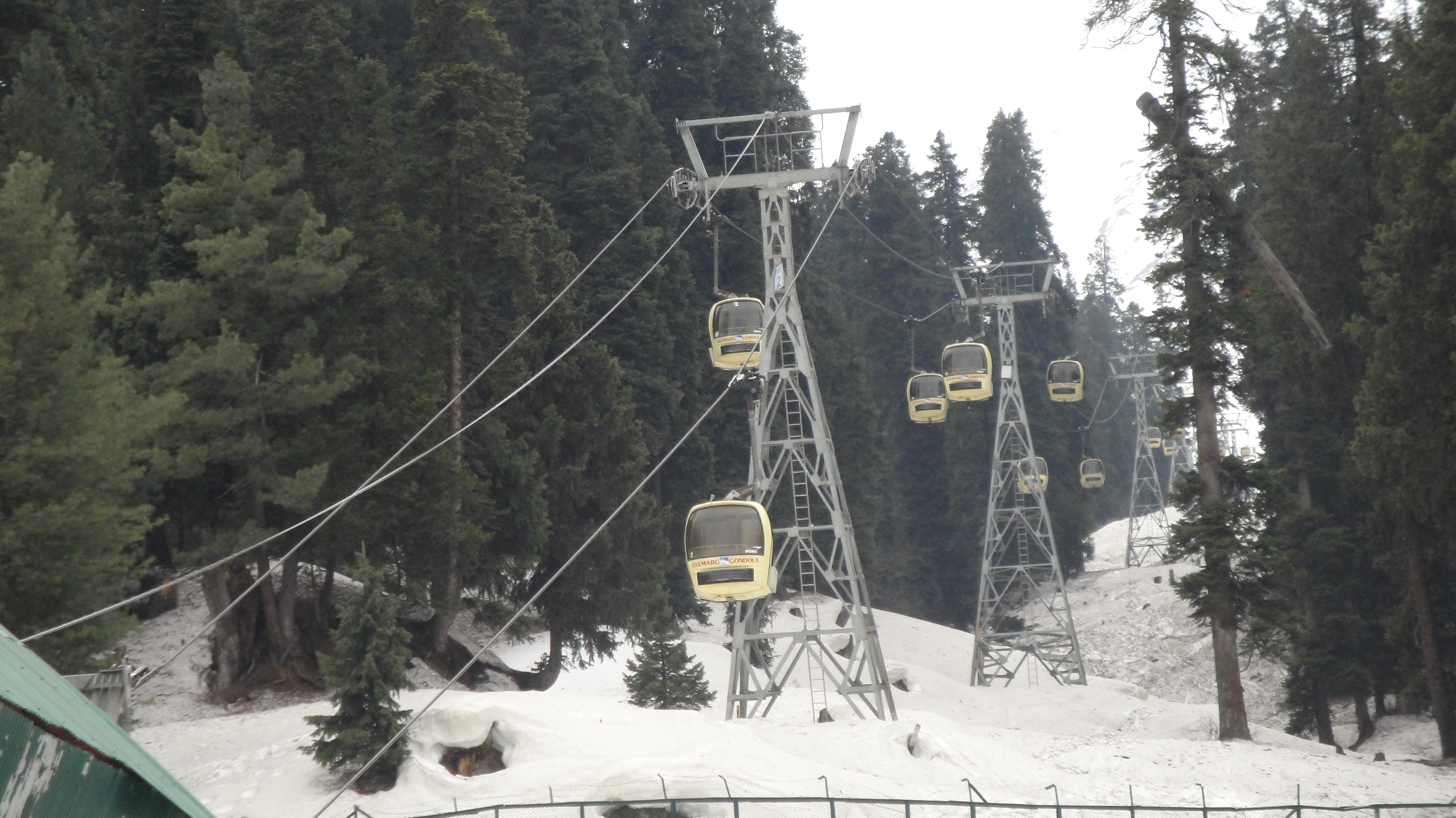
Gulmarg's gondola lift in Kashmir

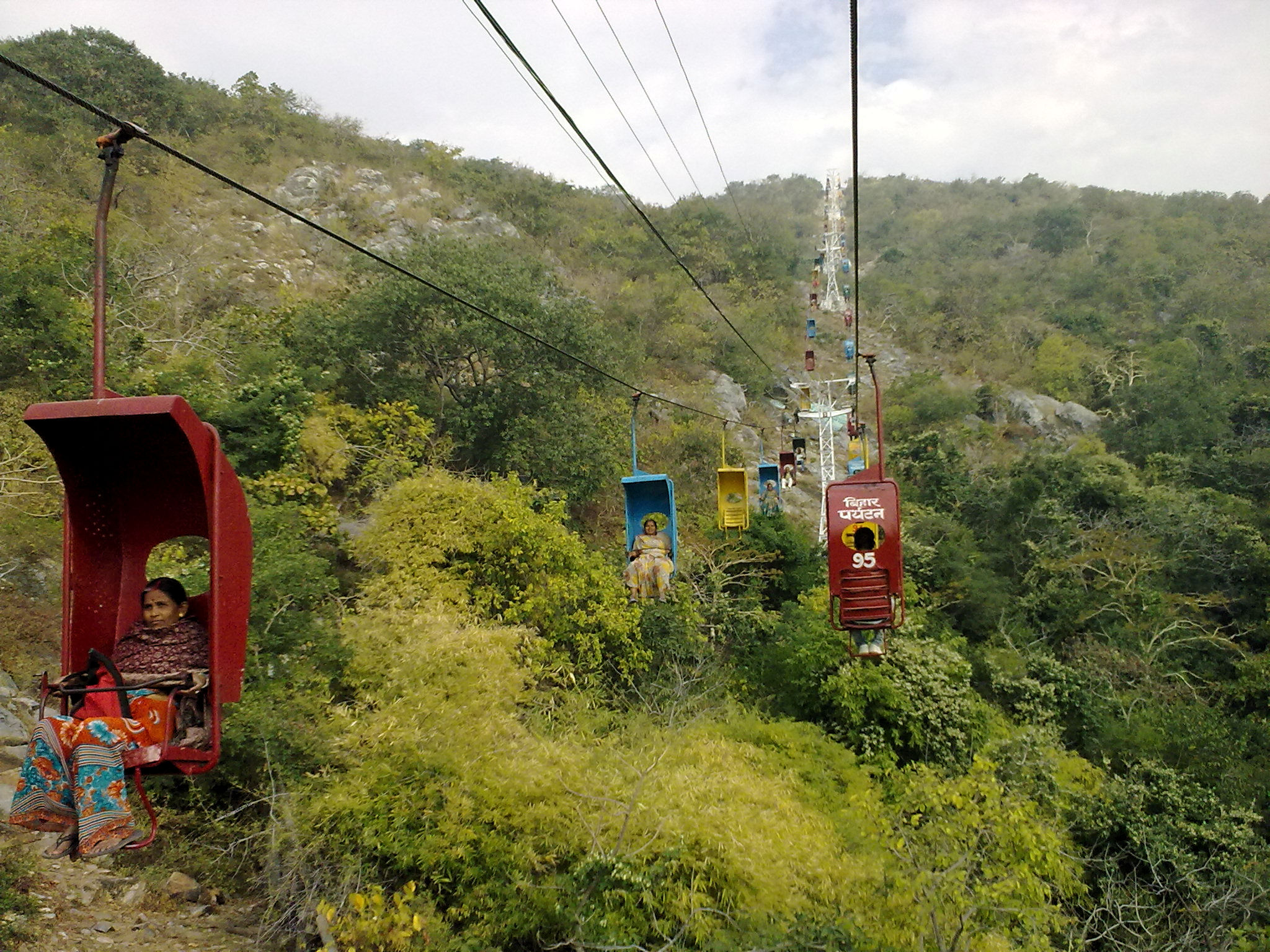
Rajgir's chairlift ropeway in Bihar

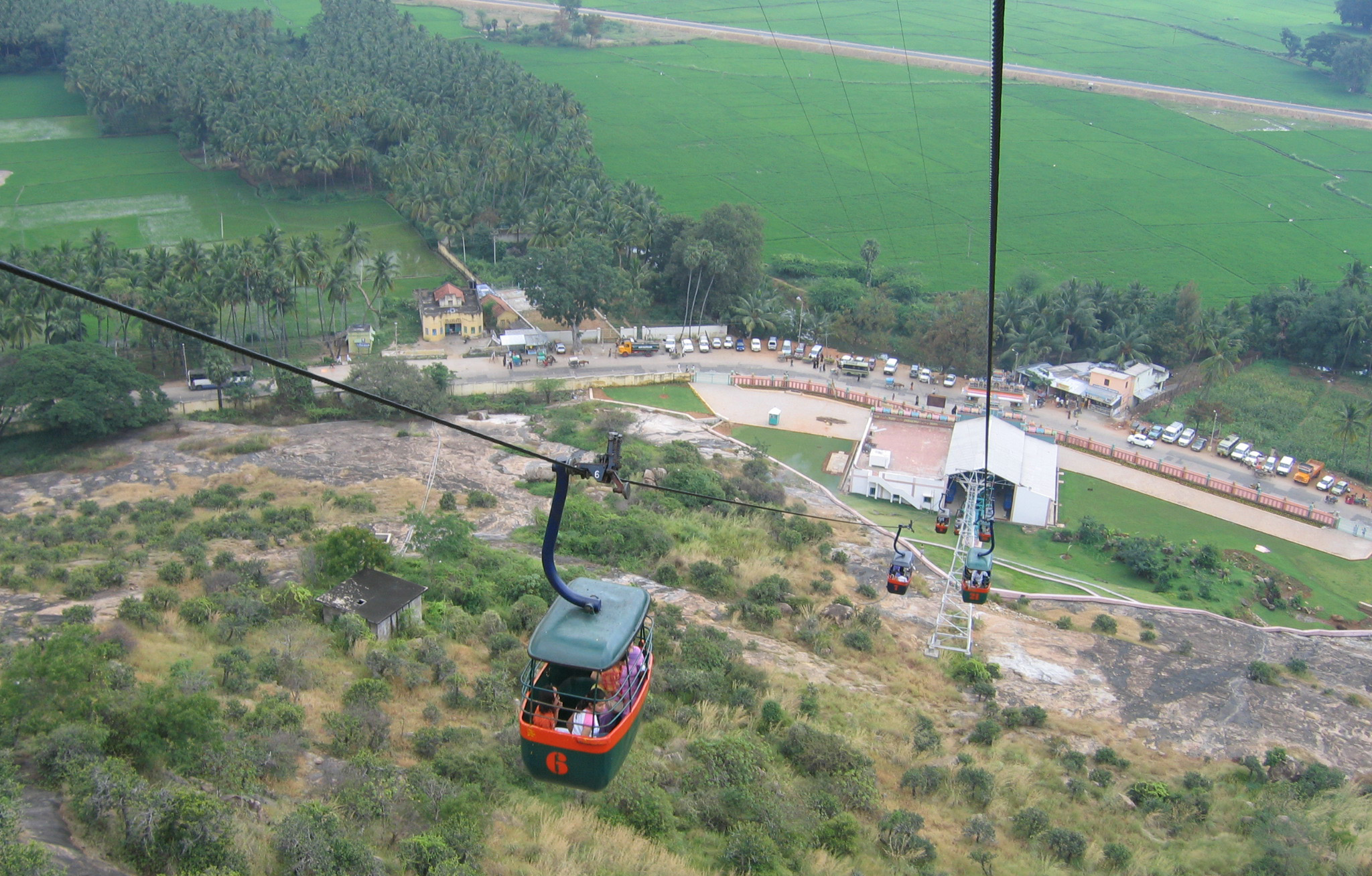
View of Palani from Dhandayuthapani Swamy Temple Ropeway in Tamil Nadu. Many ropeways in India are built to connect temples atop hills.

The aerial lift in India, also known as ropeways or cableways in India, consists of various Cable transport systems such as Aerial tramway, Chairlift, Gondola lift and Material ropeway where cabins, open chairs or containers are hauled above the ground with the help of cables. With 30% of India being mountainous, aerial lifts offer an efficient mode of connectivity in these terrains where roads and railways are otherwise difficult to build.

While historically restricted to hill stations and pilgrimage sites, under the Indian government's Parvatmala Scheme (lit. 'mountain garland scheme'), India envisages spending ₹1,250 billion (equivalent to ₹1.3 trillion or US$14 billion in 2026) in public–private partnership (PPP) mode over five years till 2030 to build 200 new ropeway projects of more than 1200 km length, to decongest the traffic on the narrow roads of big cities where implementation of other modes would pose challenges, in addition to mountainous locations. This article also contains a list of glass bridge skywalks in tourist locations.

Darjeeling Ropeway in West Bengal was India's first ropeway opened in 1968. Rajgir Ropeway in Bihar, a 333m-long chairlift ropeway built in the 1960s, is India's first chairlift ropeway. As of 2024, the 4 km-long Auli Ropeway in Uttarakhand is India's longest and the world's second-longest (single section) ropeway behind Vietnam's 7,899.9 m long Hòn Thơm cable car, and when completed the under-construction 5.5 km-long Mussoorie-Dehradun Ropeway will be the longest in India. Kashi ropeway is India's first urban ropeway, and world's third urban public transport ropeway behind Bolivia's Mi Teleférico opened in 2014 and Mexico City's Mexicable opened in 2021.

As of 2025, all 36 states and union territories (UT) of India have either existing or planned ropeways, except in the UTs of Dadra and Nagar Haveli and Daman and Diu, Lakshadweep, and Puducherry.

== History ==
The first aerial lifts in India were being built during the 1960s and 1970s, primarily in hill stations and religious sites. Notably, the Darjeeling ropeway was the first modern ropeway built in India. A chairlift ropeway was then built at Rajgir Hills, Bihar as a 'gift' to the Vishwa Shanti Stupa, Rajgir by the famous Japanese Buddhist monk Fuji Guruji (Nichidatsu Fujii). Political activist Jai Prakash Narayan was the first person to take the ropeway ride.

Since the 2000s, state governments and private operators have developed several ropeways with modern cabins, automated drive systems and higher safety standards. With the announcement of Parvatmala Pariyojana in 2022, the importance and popularity of ropeways has increased. The project was aimed at creating sustainable ropeway infrastructures in both mountainous and urban regions under a Public–private partnership (PPP) model.

== Terminology ==
Indian aerial lifts use a range of technologies depending on terrain, needs and passenger volume. Cabins on modern systems are typically closed, climate resilient and equipped with CCTV surveillance, emergency communication and automated braking systems.

- Gondola lift: It consists of a continuously circulating cable, strung between two or more stations over intermediate supporting towers. Mono-cable Detachable Gondola (MDG) is used for short routes and tourism, Bi-cable and Tri-cable systems span longer, provide additional support and safety during strong winds. Gondola lift is also the most widely used aerial lift system in India, including urban regions. Example: Kashi ropeway.
- Aerial tramway: It uses one or two stationary cables for support, with a third moving cable for propulsion. The grip is fixed onto the propulsion cable and thus cannot be decoupled during operation. They provide lower capacities and frequencies compared to Gondola lifts. Example: Guwahati ropeway.
- Chairlift: They are continuously circulating systems carrying chairs, usually designed for skiers to board without removing skiing equipment. Detachable chairlifts usually move faster than fixed-grip chairlifts that enable safe boarding and deboarding. Chairlifts in India are also built in non ski areas. Example: Rajgir ropeway
- Material ropeway: Material ropeways or Goods ropeways is built for carrying goods rather than passengers. They are usually monocable or bi-cable gondola lifts with containers. Example: Pamulapalli coal ropeway.

== Legalisation ==
Aerial lift projects in India are regulated by the Bureau of Indian Standards (BIS) and implemented by Ministry of Road Transport and Highways (MoRTH) under its National Highway Logistics Management Limited (NHLML), which oversees new projects under Parvatmala Pariyojana. The new ropeways are being aligned with Make in India initiative, which mandates at least 50% of indigenous components in construction.

== Tourist ropeways ==
=== Operational ===
As of 6 October 2025

List of operational tourist ropeways in India
System	Locale	Type	Length	Opened	Notes
Ambaji ropeway	Gabbar Hill, Gujarat	Monocabled gondola	363 m (1,191 ft)	1998	Opened windows.
Auli ropeway	Joshimath, Uttarakhand	Aerial tramway	4,150 m (13,620 ft)	1993	Glass windows.
Bambleshwari Temple ropeway	Dongargarh, Chhattisgarh	Bi-cabled gondola lift	387 m (1,270 ft)	2021	Glass windows.
Bhaleydhunga ropeway	Namchi district, Sikkim	Monocable gondola lift	3,500 m (11,500 ft)	2024	Glass windows.
Bhatta falls ropeway	Mussoorie, Uttarakhand	Monocable gondola lift	308 m (1,010 ft)	2019	
Bheraghat ropeway	Bhedaghat, Madhya Pradesh	Monocable gondola lift	600 m (2,000 ft)	2025	Glass windows.
Bhopal ropeway	Mahaveer Giri, Madhya Pradesh	Monocable gondola lift	600 m (2,000 ft)	2001	Glass windows.
Chandi devi ropeway	Haridwar, Uttarakhand	Monocable gondola lift	740 m (2,430 ft)	1997	Glass windows.
Chitrakoot ropeway	Chitrakoot, Madhya Pradesh	Monocable gondola lift	302 m (991 ft)	2020	Opened windows.
Darjeeling Ropeway	Darjeeling, West Bengal	Monocable gondola lift	5,000 m (16,000 ft) (Note: in two sections of 2,500 m each)	1968	Glass windows. India's first ropeway.
Dewas ropeway	Dewas, Madhya Pradesh	Monocable gondola lift	367 m (1,204 ft)	2017	Glass windows.
Dhandayuthapani Swamy Temple ropeway	Palani, Tamil Nadu	Monocable gondola lift	323 m (1,060 ft)	2004	Open windows.
Digha ropeway	Digha, West Bengal	Monocable gondola lift	194 m (636 ft)	2015	Glass windows.
Gangtok ropeway	Gangtok, Sikkim	Monocable gondola lift	1,600 m (5,200 ft)	2003	Glass windows. Plans to convert into urban ropeway.
Girnar ropeway	Mount Girnar, Gujarat	Monocable gondola lift	2,300 m (7,500 ft)	2020	Glass windows.
Gulmarg Gondola	Gulmarg, Jammu and Kashmir	Monocable gondola lift	4,631 m (15,194 ft) (Note: in two sections 2.4 km and 2.2 km)	1998	Ski resort gondola lift; Glass windows.
Gun Hill ropeway	Mussoorie, Uttarakhand	Aerial tramway	400 m (1,300 ft)	1971	Glass windows. India's first aerial tramway.
Hirakud Dam ropeway	Hirakud, Odisha	Monocable gondola lift	412 m (1,352 ft)	2019	Glass windows.
Jammu ropeway	Jammu, Jammu and Kashmir	Monocable gondola lift	1,660 m (5,450 ft)	2020	Glass windows.
Jakhu Temple ropeway	Shimla, Himachal Pradesh	Aerial tramway	600 m (2,000 ft)	2017	Glass windows.
Kailasagiri ropeway	Visakhapatnam, Andhra Pradesh	Monocable gondola lift	375 m (1,230 ft)	2004	Glass windows.
Kolkata Science City ropeway	Kolkata, West Bengal	Monocable gondola lift	400 m (1,300 ft)	1998	Opened windows.
Laxman Pahadi ropeway	Chitrakoot district, Uttar Pradesh	Monocable gondola lift	256 m (840 ft)	2019	Glass windows.
Maa Sharda ropeway	Maihar, Madhya Pradesh	Monocable gondola lift	760 m (2,490 ft)	2009	Glass windows.
Madan Negi ropeway	Sandana, Uttarakhand	Aerial trmaway	995 m (3,264 ft)	2009	Caged windows.
Marjing Polo Complex ropeway	Imphal, Manipur	Monocable gondola lift	600 m (2,000 ft)	2025	Glass windows.
Nainital ropeway	Nainital, Uttarakhand	Aerial tramway	705 m (2,313 ft)	1990	Glass windows.
Nandankanan ropeway	Bhubaneswar, Odisha	Monocable gondola lift	618 m (2,028 ft)	2023	Partial glass windows.
Parwanoo ropeway	Parwanoo Timber Trail, Himachal Pradesh	Aerial tramway	1,800 m (5,900 ft)	1988	Partially opened glass windows.
Pavagadh ropeway	Pavagadh Hill, Gujarat	Monocable gondola lift	774 m (2,539 ft)	1986	Glass windows.
Pushkar Savitri Mata Temple ropeway	Pushkar, Rajasthan	Monocable gondola lift	720 m (2,360 ft)	2015	Partially opened glass windows.
Rajgir ropeway	Rajgir, Bihar	Chairlift	333 m (1,093 ft)	1969	Single seater. India's first chairlift ropeway.
Saputara ropeway	Saputara, Gujarat	Monocable gondola lift	920 m (3,020 ft)	1991	Partially opened glass windows.
Shri Naina Devi ropeway	Sri Naina Devi, Himachal Pradesh	Monocable gondola lift	500 m (1,600 ft)	1997	Caged windows.
Srisailam ropeway	Srisailam, Andhra Pradesh	Monocable gondola lift	700 m (2,300 ft)	2005	Opened windows.
Sundha Mata Temple ropeway	Jalore district, Rajasthan	Monocable gondola lift	800 m (2,625 ft)	2006	Glass windows.
Surkanda Devi ropeway	Saklana range, Uttarakhand	Monocable gondola lift	502 m (1,647 ft)	2022	Glass windows.
Tara Tarini Mandir ropeway	Purushottampur, Odisha	Monocable gondola lift	333 m (1,093 ft)	2013	Glass windows.
Vaishno Devi Temple ropeway	Katra, Jammu and Kashmir	Aerial tramway	375 m (1,230 ft)	2018	Glass windows; Air conditioned
Mandar Hill ropeway	Banka, Bihar	Monocable gondola lift	377 m (1,238 ft)	2021	Glass windows
Jeen Mata ropeway	Rewasa, Sikar, Rajasthan	Monocable gondola lift	270 m (886 ft)	2024	Glass windows
Neemach Mata ropeway	Udaipur, Rajasthan	Monocable gondola lift	429.419 m (1,409 ft)	2024	Glass windows; ventilated cabins; automatic doors
Mansapurna Karni Mata Ropeway	Udaipur, Rajasthan	Monocable gondola lift	387 m (1,270 ft)	2008	Glass windows
Khole Ke Hanuman Ji ropeway	Jaipur, Rajasthan	Monocable gondola lift	436 m (1,430 ft)	2023	Glass windows; automatic doors
Dharamshala Skyway	Dharamshala, Himachal Pradesh	Monocable detachable gondola	1,775 m (5,823 ft)	2022	Connects Kotwali Bazaar to McLeod Ganj; capacity of 1,000 passengers per hour per direction.
Skyview Patnitop Ropeway	Sanget Valley–Patnitop, Udhampur, Jammu and Kashmir	Gondola lift	2,800 m (9,186 ft)	2019	Connects Sanget Valley and Patnitop; current operational status not independently confirmed.
Makhdoom Sahib Ropeway	Hari Parbat, Srinagar, Jammu & Kashmir	Monocable gondola lift	585 m (1,920 ft)	2013	Skips 100+ steep steps for elderly pilgrims; offers panoramic views of Srinagar Old City & Dal Lake
Malampuzha Ropeway	Palakkad, Kerala	Chairlift / Ropeway	2,000 m (6,560 ft)	1991	The Malampuzha Ropeway, opened in 1991 at Malampuzha Gardens in Palakkad, Kerala, is South India's first passenger ropeway.
Raigad Ropeway	Raigad Fort, Maharashtra	Aerial tramway	760 m (2,493 ft)	1996	The Raigad Ropeway, opened in 1996 in Raigad district, Maharashtra.
Mansa Devi Ropeway	Haridwar, Uttarakhand	Monocable gondola lift	576 m (1,890 ft)	1981	The Mansa Devi ropeway, opened in 1981 at Haridwar in Uttarakhand.
Solang Valley Ropeway	Manali, Himachal Pradesh	Monocable gondola lift	1,300 m (4,265 ft)	2010	The Solang Valley ropeway, opened in 2010 in Kullu district, Himachal Pradesh.
Jatayu Earth's Center Ropeway	Chadayamangalam, Kollam, Kerala	Monocable gondola lift	500 m (1,640 ft)	2018	The Jatayu Earth's Center ropeway, opened in 2018 at Chadayamangalam in Kollam district, Kerala.

=== Systems in development ===
As of 6 October 2025

Under construction
Planned

List of under-development tourist ropeways in India
System	Locale	Type	Length	Year proposed	Construction began	Planned opening	Notes
Shillong peak ropeway	Shillong, Meghalaya	Monocable gondola lift	2,100 m (6,900 ft)	2022	2024	TBD	Glass windows.
Nandi hills ropeway	Chikkaballapur, Karnataka	Monocable gondola lift	2,930 m (9,610 ft)	2023	2026	2028	Glass windows.
Netaji Subhash Chandra Bose Dweep ropeway	Ross Is., Andaman and Nicobar	TBD	375 m (1,230 ft)	2023	TBD	TBD	
Dhosi Hill ropeway	Dhosi hill, Haryana	Bi-cabled gondola lift	880 m (2,890 ft)	2024	2025	TBD	Construction tender awarded (Feb 2025)
Panaji ropeway	Panaji, Goa	TBD	500 m (1,600 ft)	2025	TBD	TBD	
Golconda fort ropeway	Golconda, Telangana	TBD	1,500 m (4,900 ft)	2025	TBD	TBD	
Tiruvannamalai ropeway	Tiruvannamalai, Tamil Nadu	TBD		2025	TBD	TBD	Bid for DPR invited in Nov 2025.
Glenmorgan-Singara Power House ropeway	Ooty, Tamil Nadu	TBD		2025	TBD	TBD	Bid for DPR invited in Nov 2025.
Kurangani Top Station ropeway	Theni district, Tamil Nadu	TBD		2025	TBD	TBD	Bid for DPR invited in Nov 2025.
Thoranamalai Murugan Temple	Tenkasi district, Tamil Nadu	TBD		2025	TBD	TBD	Bid for DPR invited in Nov 2025.
Sathuragiri Hills ropeway-1	Virudhunagar district, Tamil Nadu	TBD		2025	TBD	TBD	Bid for DPR invited in Nov 2025.
Sathuragiri Hills ropeway-2	Virudhunagar district, Tamil Nadu	TBD		2025	TBD	TBD	Bid for DPR invited in Nov 2025.
Bijli Mahadev ropeway	Kullu, Himachal Pradesh	TBD		2025	TBD	TBD	Construction tender awarded (Feb 2025)
Mahakaleshwar Temple ropeway	Ujjain, Madhya Pradesh	TBD		2025	TBD	TBD	Construction tender awarded (Feb 2025)
Sangam ropeway	Prayagraj, Uttar Pradesh	TBD		2025	TBD	TBD	Construction tender awarded (Feb 2025)
Shankaracharya Temple ropeway	Srinagar, Jammu and Kashmir	TBD		2025	TBD	TBD	Construction tender awarded (Feb 2025)
Sonprayag-Kedarnath ropeway	Kedarnath, Uttarakhand	TBD		2025	TBD	TBD	Bid invited (Feb 2025)
Govindghat Hemkund Sahib ropeway	Hemkund Sahib, Uttarakhand	TBD		2025	TBD	TBD	Bid invited (Feb 2025)
Kamakhya Temple ropeway	Assam	TBD		2025	TBD	TBD	Bid invited (Feb 2025)
Tawang Monastery-PT Tso Lake ropeway	Tawang Monastery, Arunachal Pradesh	TBD		2025	TBD	TBD	Bid invited (Feb 2025)
Kathgodam-Hanuman Garhi Temple ropeway	Nainital, Uttarakhand	TBD		2025	TBD	TBD	Bid invited (Feb 2025)
Ramtek Gad Temple ropeway	Ramtek, Maharashtra	TBD		2025	TBD	TBD	Bid invited (Feb 2025)
Brahmagiri-Anjaneri ropeway	Anjaneri, Maharashtra	TBD		2025	TBD	TBD	Bid invited (Feb 2025)
Barabar Hills ropeway	Jehanabad district, Bihar	Monocable gondola lif		2015	2022	TBD	Connects Hathiyabor with Siddheshwar Nath Temple.
Brahmyoni Hill ropeway	Gaya Ji, Bihar	Monocable gondola lif		2016	2024	TBD	Government-sanctioned; cost ₹8.67 crore.
Dungeshwari Hill ropeway	Bodh Gaya, Bihar	Monocable gondola lif		2016	2024	TBD	Government-sanctioned project; estimated cost ₹16.76 crore
Pretshila Hill ropeway	Gaya Ji, Bihar	Monocable gondola lif		2016	2023	2027	Government-sanctioned tourist ropeway project; estimated cost ₹10.48 crore
Tikitoriya Mata Temple ropeway	Rehli, Sagar district, Madhya Pradesh		150 m (492 ft )	2022	2026	2027	Pilgrimage access to Tikitoriya Mata Temple; cost ₹21.89 crore.
Rohtasgarh Fort ropeway	Rohtas, Bihar	Monocable gondola lift	1,324 m (4,344 ft)	2012 (plan approved); ₹12.65 crore sanctioned 2015–16	2020 (Feb)	TBD	Connects Rohtas to Rohtasgarh Fort and Rohiteshwar Dham/Chaurasan Temple; ₹13.65 crore; 5 towers, 12 cabins × 4 seats. Collapsed during a load trial on 26 Dec 2025; contractor blacklisted, engineers suspended; being rebuilt on a revised IIT Patna–approved design .
Mundeshwari Hills ropeway	Bhagwanpur (Pawara Hill), Kaimur district, Bihar	Mono-cable pulsated system	400 m	2015 (₹7.35 crore sanctioned 2015–16)	TBD	TBD	Connects the base of Mundeshwari Hills to the Maa Mundeshwari Devi Temple; ₹7.35 crore; 500 PPH, 16 cabins of 4 seats; final forest clearance granted Dec 2025.
Kullu Dhalpur–Peej ropeway	Kullu Bus Stand (Sarwari/Dhalpur)–Peej Paragliding Point, Kullu, Himachal Pradesh	Aerial passenger ropeway	1,200 m (3,937 ft)	2024	TBD	TBD	Estimated cost ₹80 crore. Stage-I and forest clearances obtained; Stage-II approval under process. Construction expected to commence in December 2026.

As of 6 October 2025

Closed

List of abandoned tourist ropeways in India
System	Locale	Type	Length	Opened	Closed	Notes
Tawang Monastery ropeway	Tawang, Arunachal Pradesh	Bi-cabled gondola lift	1,184 m (3,885 ft)	2010	2024	Permanently closed.
Trikut Hill ropeway	Deoghar, Jharkhand	Monocable gondola lift	766 m (2,513 ft)	2009	2022	Permanently closed after fatal accident.
Samod Veer Hanuman Ji ropeway	Samod, Rajasthan	Monocable jig-back	365 m (1,198 ft)	2019	2019	Commercial operation suspended; reopening unconfirmed.

== Urban ropeways ==
=== Operational ===
As of 6 October 2025

List of operational urban ropeways in India
System	Locale	Type	Lines	Stations	Length	Opened	Notes
Guwahati Ropeway	Umananda Island, Assam	Aerial tramway	1	3	1.82 km (1.13 mi)	24 August 2020	Glass windows; Swiss manufactured cabins.

=== Systems in development ===
As of 6 October 2025

Under construction
Planned

List of under-development urban ropeways in India
System	Locale	Type	Length	Year proposed	Construction began	Planned opening	Notes
Kashi ropeway	Varanasi, Uttar Pradesh	Monocable gondola lift	3.75 km (2.33 mi)	2022	2023	2026	India's first urban gondola lift.
Aarey Metro Station-Film City ropeway	Mumbai, Maharashtra	TBD	3 km (1.9 mi)	2025	TBD	TBD	Possible extension to Sanjay Gandhi National Park.
Lengpui-Sairang-Aizawl ropeway	Aizawl, Mizoram	TBD	16.62 km (10.33 mi)	2025	TBD	TBD	

== Material ropeways ==
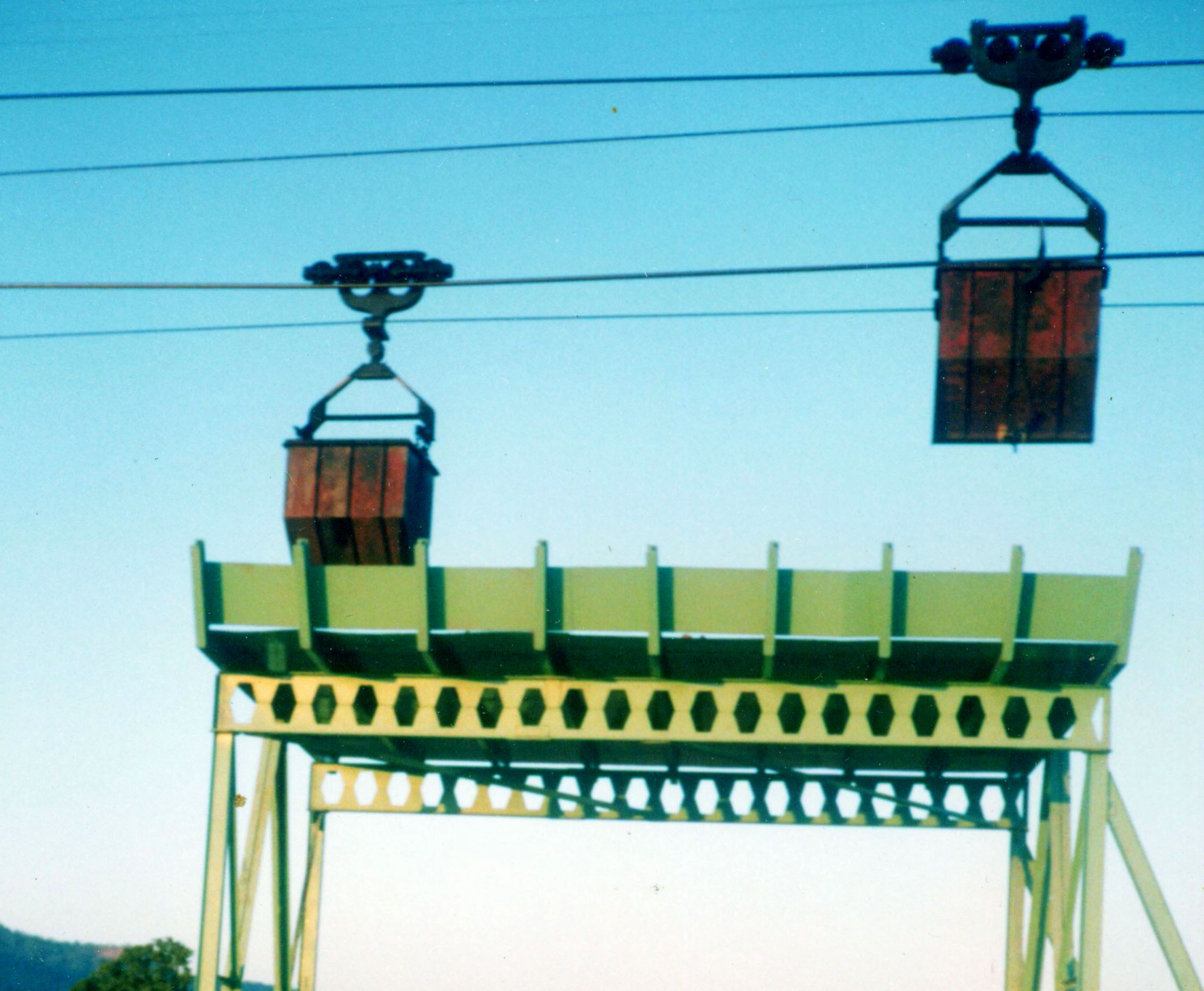
Coal handling ropeway near Pamulapalli in Telangana

=== Operational ===
As of 6 October 2025

List of operational material ropeways in India
System	Locale	Type	Material handled	Length	Opened	Notes
Pamulapalli coal ropeway	Manuguru, Telangana	Bi-cabled gondola	Coal	11.8 km (7.3 mi)	1971	India's first material ropeway. Designed and built by German company.

== List of glass bridges ==
This is a list of glass bridges in India, by state.

- Andhra Pradesh
  - Vishakhapatnam Kailasagiri Skybridge, operational, 55 meter glassbridge on hilltop overlooking the city and east coast.
- Bihar
  - Rajgir Glass Bridge at Rajgir, operational.
- Haryana
  - Adi Badri Glass Bridge Sky Walk, planned.
  - Dhosi Hill Glass Bridge Skywalk, planned.
  - Madhogarh Glass Bridge Skywalk, planned.
  - Tosham Glass Bridge Sky Walk, planned.
- Kerala
  - Mini Ooty Glass Bridge at Mini Ootty in Malappuram District: 60 meter glass bridge skywalk, longest such bridge in India as of June 2024. Longest Glass bridge in India
  - Vagamon Glass Bridge at Vagamon in Idukki District: 40 m cantilever glass bridge skywalk, second longest such bridge in India as of June 2024.
  - Waynad Glass Bridge at 900 Kandi:
- Maharashtra
  - Lonavala Tiger Point Skywalk, a 125 meter long, 6 meter wide, horseshoe-shaped glass-bridge skywalk at Tiger Point in Lonavala, will commence construction in 2025 with target completion by June 2027.
- Sikkim
  - Chenrezig statue and skywalk at Pelling:
- Tamil Nadu
  - Kanyakumari Glass bridge

== See also ==
- Targeted projects
  - Bharatmala, India's project to connect all district headquarters with highways
  - Golden Quadrilateral, India's project to connect major cities of India forming a quadrilateral
  - Setu Bharatam, India's project to make all national highways railway crossings free
  - Sagar Mala, India's project to modernise and connect all shipping ports
  - UDAN, India's project for regional civil aviation connectivity
- Transport in India
  - Funicular railways in India
  - Urban rail transit in India
  - Future of rail transport in India
  - Expressways of India
  - List of national highways in India
  - Indian Human Spaceflight Programme
- General
  - List of aerial tramways
  - List of gondola lifts
