= Saputara ropeway =

Ropeway in Gujarat, India

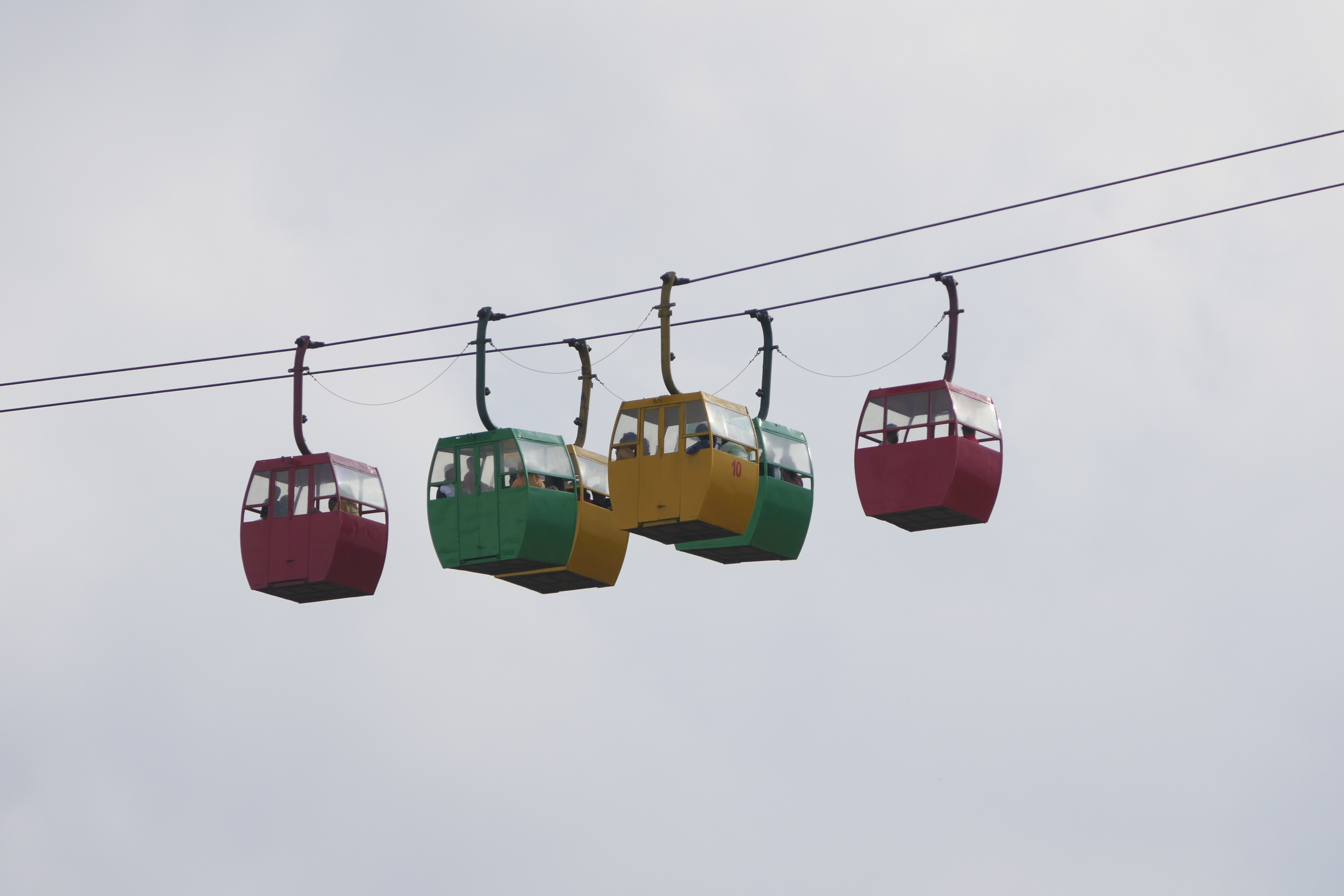
- Saputara ropeway

- Location within Gujarat
- Interactive map of Saputara ropeway

Overview
- Other name: Pushpak ropeway
- Character: Recreational
- Location: Saputara
- Country: India
- Coordinates: 20.576°N 73.73533°E
- Termini: Sunset point Sunrise point
- No. of stations: 2
- Services: Saputara, Gujarat

Operation
- No. of carriers: 6
- Carrier capacity: 4 passengers
- Operating times: 9:00 am to 1:00 pm, 2:00 pm to 7:00 pm
- Trip duration: 5-7 minutes
- Fare: ₹77 (80¢ US) (2019)

Technical features
- Aerial lift type: Mono-cable gondola detachable
- No. of cables: 2

Saputara ropeway, officially Pushpak ropeway, is a ropeway in Saputara, Dang district, Gujarat, India.

== History ==
The construction of ropeway started in 1987.

The ropeway starts from Sunset point and takes to the Sunrise point and Governor's hill. It is suspended above the Saputara Lake. It offers view of the Saputara town and valley.

== See also ==
- Aerial lift in India
- Girnar ropeway
- Pavagadh ropeway
- Ambaji ropeway
