= Karchelia =

- Karchelia, Surat District
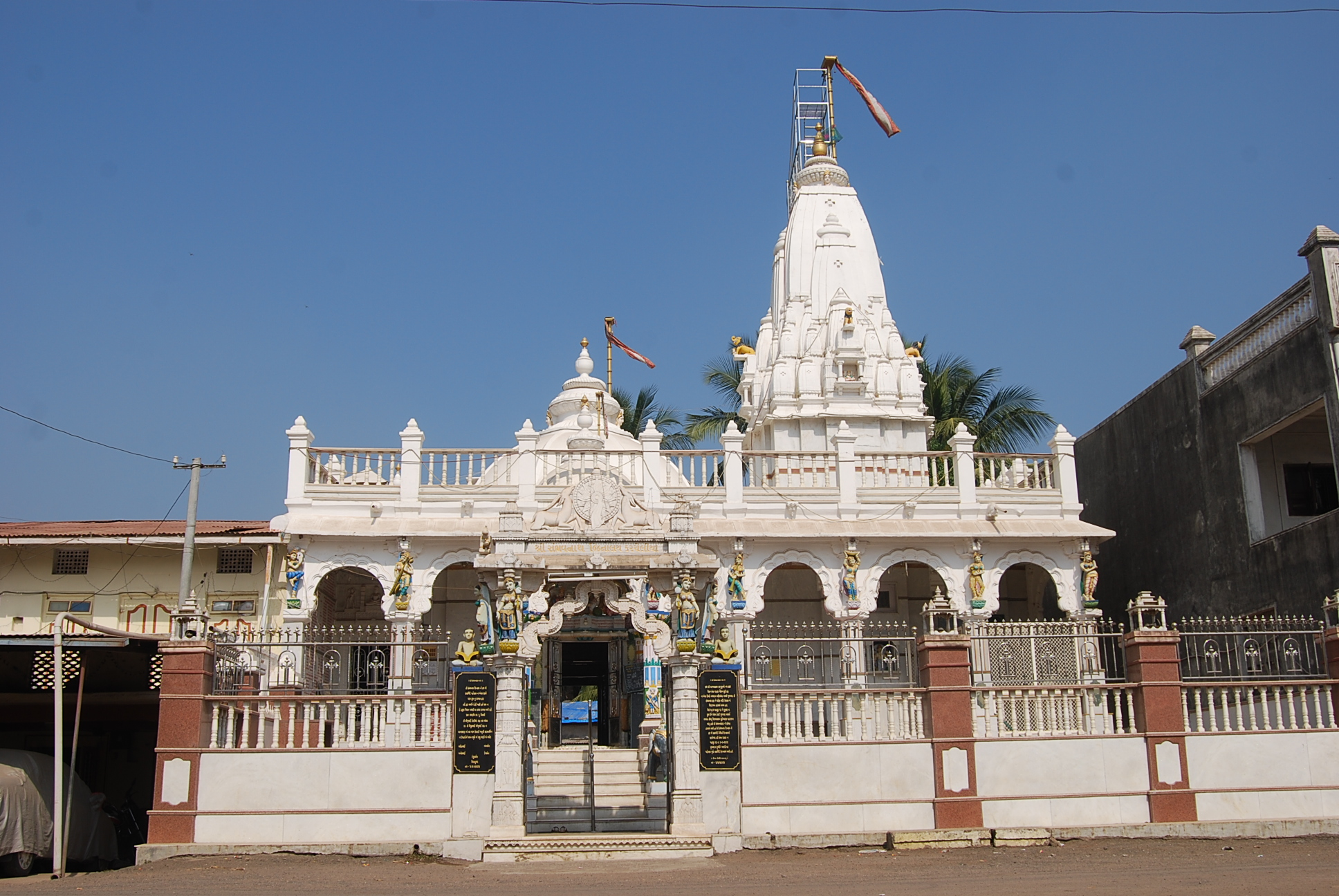
- Karchelia Jain temple

- Location within Gujarat Location within India
- Coordinates: 20.966981°N 73.166793°E
- Country: India
- State: Gujarat
- District: Surat
- Taluka: Mahuwa, Surat

Government
  - Body: Karchelia Gram Panchayat
  - Sarpanch: Sumitraben Bharatbhai Garasiya
  - Mahuwa Taluka PSI Officer (Mahuwa Fojdaar): Not known
- Elevation: 34 m (112 ft)

Population (2011)
  - Total: 5,851
- Time zone: UTC+5:30 (IST)
- Pincode(s): 394 240
- Area code: 91-262-5XX-XXXX
- Spoken languages: Gujarati, Hindi, English

Karchelia is a town of 5,851 people about 55 km southeast of Surat, Gujarat, India. Karchelia is well-connected with public transport from Surat, Bardoli, Navsari, Ahmedabad and Saputara.

Karchelia is an economic hub of Mahuwa taluka in Surat District, Gujarat, India, due to its prominent shops for grocery, cloths, agricultural supplies, nearby sugar factory, and vibrant agriculture cultivation.

== Facilities ==
Karchelia garbage recycling center is a model recycling facility in Gujarat.

Karchelia is a home to a government primary school called "Vardha Rashtrya Prathmik school", semi-private primary school and B.B.S. High School, B.Ed. college and I.T.I. training school. Karchelia traders are well known for their business acumen in retail and wholesale business and are well connected with politicians.

== Seasons ==
Karchelia has a mild winter (November–March), hot summer (April–June) and monsoon (June–October). Winter temperature are 70° to 90 °F (20° to 30 °C). Summer temperatures range from 80° to 104 °F (30° to 40 °C). Monsoon rain usually begins in late June and continues until October, the temperature also drops however the rain can be non-stop for a week at a time. Karchelia does not experience floods, hurricanes, or earthquakes. The best time to visit Karchelia is October through March, due to the bearable heat and lack of monsoon rains.

== See also ==
- List of tourist attractions in Surat
