= Kashi ropeway =

Aerial cable car in Uttar Pradesh, India

- Location within Uttar Pradesh
- Interactive map of Kashi ropeway

Overview
- Status: Under Construction
- Character: Urban transit
- Line no.: 1
- Location: Varanasi
- Country: India
- Coordinates: 25.32652648°N 82.98626268°E
- Termini: Varanasi Cantonment; Godowlia Chowk
- No. of stations: 5
- Services: Varanasi, Uttar Pradesh
- Built by: Vishwa Samudra Engineering Pvt Ltd
- Construction cost: ₹807 crore (US$84 million)
- Construction begin: May 2023

Operation
- No. of carriers: 153
- Carrier capacity: 10 passengers
- Ridership: 96000/day (expected)
- Operating times: 16 hrs/day
- Trip duration: 16 minutes

Technical features
- Manufactured by: Bartholet Maschinenbau AG
- Line length: 3.75 kilometres (2.33 mi)
- No. of support towers: 30

Kashi ropeway is an under construction aerial cable car urban transit system in Varanasi, Uttar Pradesh, India. It will be the first public transport ropeway of India. It will be 3.75km long with five stations connecting Varanasi Cantonment railway station to Godowlia Chowk. The foundation stone was laid on March 2023. It is expected to open on 24 November 2026.

== History ==
When the development plan of metro was rejected in June 2018, the Varanasi Development Authority (VDA) asked Rail India Technical and Economic Service (RITES) to prepare mass rapid transit system (MRTS) plan for the city in December 2019. RITES included ropeway and light metro in MRTS plan. It is being constructed under Parvatmala Pariyojana.

The project was presented by WAPCOS Limited in November 2021 and the first tender was floated in December 2021 but was repeatedly delayed later. The two Austrian engineering firms Salzmann and Bernard Group planned the project. In December 2021, VDA authorised National Highways Logistics Management Ltd (NHLML), a subsidiary of National Highway Authority of India (NHAI) to execute the project which also conducted feasibility study. VDA and NHLML signed memorandum of understating with Government of Uttar Pradesh and Indian Railways. The Government of Uttar Pradesh acquired the land for stations and towers. Sai Geotechnical Engineer Pvt Ltd conducted the geotechnical investigation.

In April–June 2022, the tender was floated by the NHLML. In December 2022, the NHLML awarded the contract worth ₹807 crore (US$84 million) to Vishwa Samudra Engineering Private Limited and Bartholet Maschinenbau AG of Switzerland. The bid price was ₹815.6 crore (US$85 million). It will be constructed using hybrid annuity model, in which 60% and 40% of the cost will be paid during the construction period and operation-maintenance period respectively. The company will maintain the ropeway for 15 years.

On 24 March 2023, Prime Minister Narendra Modi laid the foundation of the ropeway. The construction will cost ₹807 crore (US$84 million). It will facilitate movement of local people, tourists and pilgrims to Godowlia, Kashi Corridor, Kashi Vishwanath Temple and Dashashwamedh Ghat. The construction started in May 2023.

It was originally scheduled to open in August 2025. The trial runs started in September 2026. It is expected to open on 24 November 2026.

It will be the first public transport ropeway of India.

== Technical features ==
The line will be 3.75 km (2.33 mi) long. It will operate from Varanasi Cantonment railway station to Godowlia Chowk. It will have three other stations: Kashi Vidyapith (Bharat Mata Mandir), Rath Yatra and Girja Ghar. There will be no passenger exchange at Girja Ghar. Total 30 towers with height ranging from 10 to 55 metre will be constructed.

It is expected to transport 96,000 passengers per day. It will have a maximum capacity of 3000 passengers per hour per direction. It will have 153 cars with capacity of 10 passengers each. It will operate 16 hours a day and will complete the trip in 16 minutes.

Line	Terminus stations	Other stations	Length	Travel time	Stations	Cabins	Capacity	Towers	Expected date of opening
Line-1	Varanasi cantonment - Godowlia Chowk	Kashi Vidyapith (Bharatmala Mandir); Rath Yatra; Girja Ghar	3.75 km (2.33 mi)	16 min	5	153	3000 pphpd	30	November 2026

== See also ==
- Varanasi Metro
- Aerial lift in India
