= Saputara Lake =

Lake in Gujarat, India

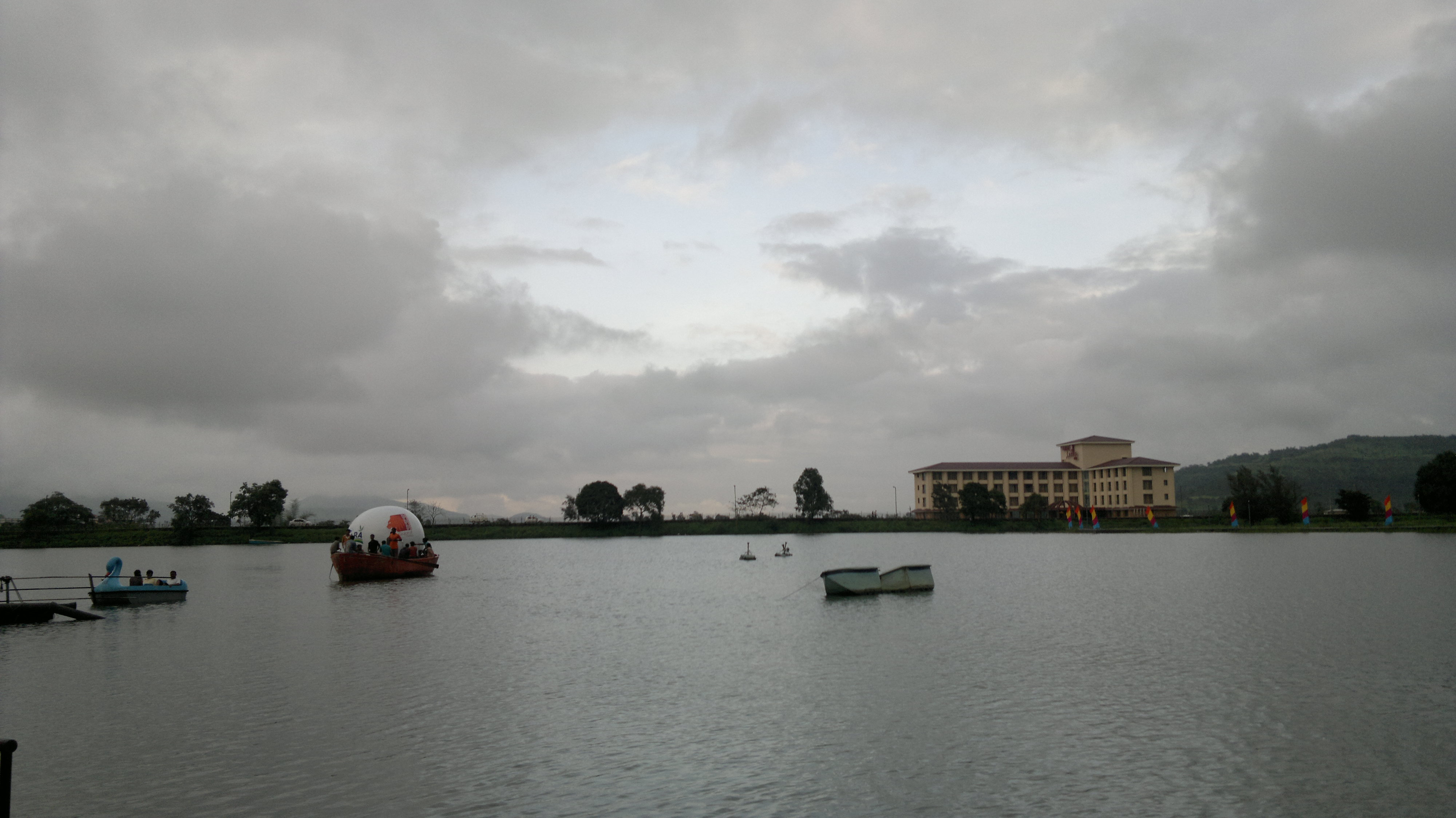

- Location in Gujarat
- Location: Dang, Gujarat
- Coordinates: 20.5755°N 73.7452°E
- Lake type: Artificial lake
- Basin countries: India
- Settlements: Dang

Saputara Lake is a man made lake situated in Dang district in the Indian state of Gujarat. The lake is 1 kilometer from the main city hill station Saputara town, which is a tourist destination.

== History ==
Saputara has mythological importance as it is believed that Lord Rama spent 11 years of his exile here. The name Saputara literally means ‘Abode of Serpents’.

== Geography ==
The lake is manmade and is quite popular for activities like boating. There are several children's parks also in the locality and several other play grounds for the entertainment of the tourists. There are several boating clubs located near the lake. The season after the monsoon is considered to be the best for visiting the lake.

== Leisure ==
Saputara Lake is encompassed by undulating hills and lush greenery, which make it a picturesque place to relax and rejoice. It also offers a distant panorama of the majestic Sahyadri Hills. The sunrise and sunset points of this lake provide stunning vistas during dawn and dusk. For the locals and tourists of Saputara, this spot is considered to be a popular picnic get away. This water body in Saputara is surrounded with lush green environs and beauty. The time after a monsoon is the best to visit.

== Nearby attractions ==
- Purna Wildlife Sanctuary
- Don Hill Station

== See also ==
- Saputara
- Dang District
