= Ambaji ropeway =

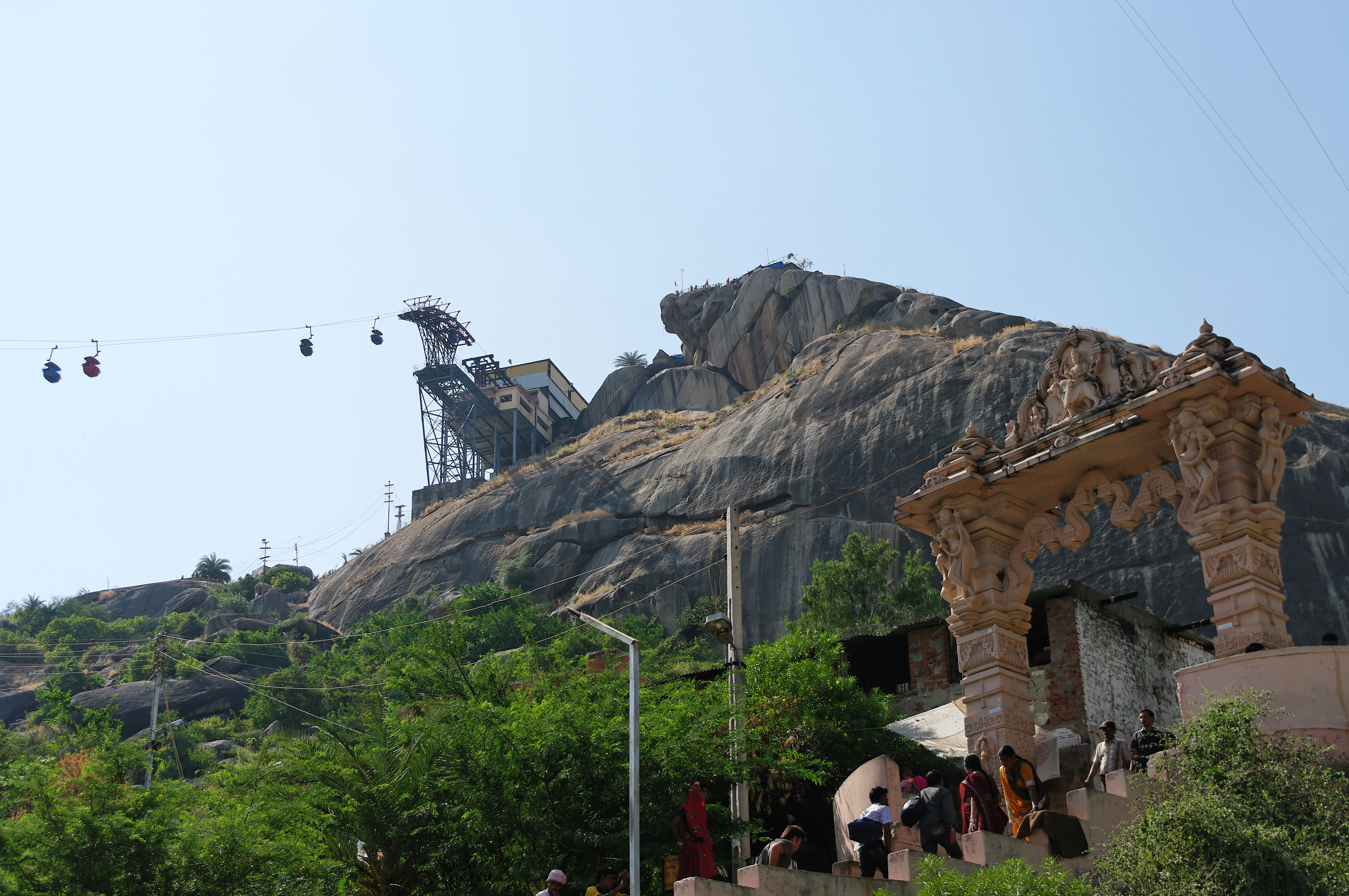
- Top station and ropeway line on the Gabbar hill

- Location within Gujarat
- Interactive map of Ambaji ropeway

Overview
- Other name: Maa Ambadevi Udan Khatola
- Character: Recreational
- Location: Ambaji
- Country: India
- Coordinates: 24.337652°N 72.829305°E
- Termini: Ground Station; Top Station
- No. of stations: 2
- Services: Ambaji, Gujarat
- Built by: Usha Breco Limited
- Open: 1998; 28 years ago
- Website: ushabreco.com

Operation
- Owner: Usha Breco Limited
- Operator: Usha Breco Limited
- Carrier capacity: 4 passengers
- Operating times: 6:00 am to 8:00 pm
- Trip duration: 2-3 minutes
- Fare: ₹94 (98¢ US) (2005)

Technical features
- Aerial lift type: Mono-cable gondola detachable
- No. of support towers: 1
- No. of cables: 2

Ambaji ropeway is a ropeway on Gabbar hill in Ambaji, Banaskantha district, Gujarat, India. It was opened in 1998.

== History ==
Ambaji is a major pilgrim town because of presence of the Ambaji Mata Temple on foothill as well as on the Gabbar hill, a Shakta pitha. Shri Arasuri Ambaji Mata Devasthan Trust which manages these temples installed the ropeway in 1998 and leased it to Usha Breco Limited.

== See also ==
- Aerial lift in India
- Girnar ropeway
- Pavagadh ropeway
- Saputara ropeway
