= Pavagadh ropeway =

Aerial lift in India

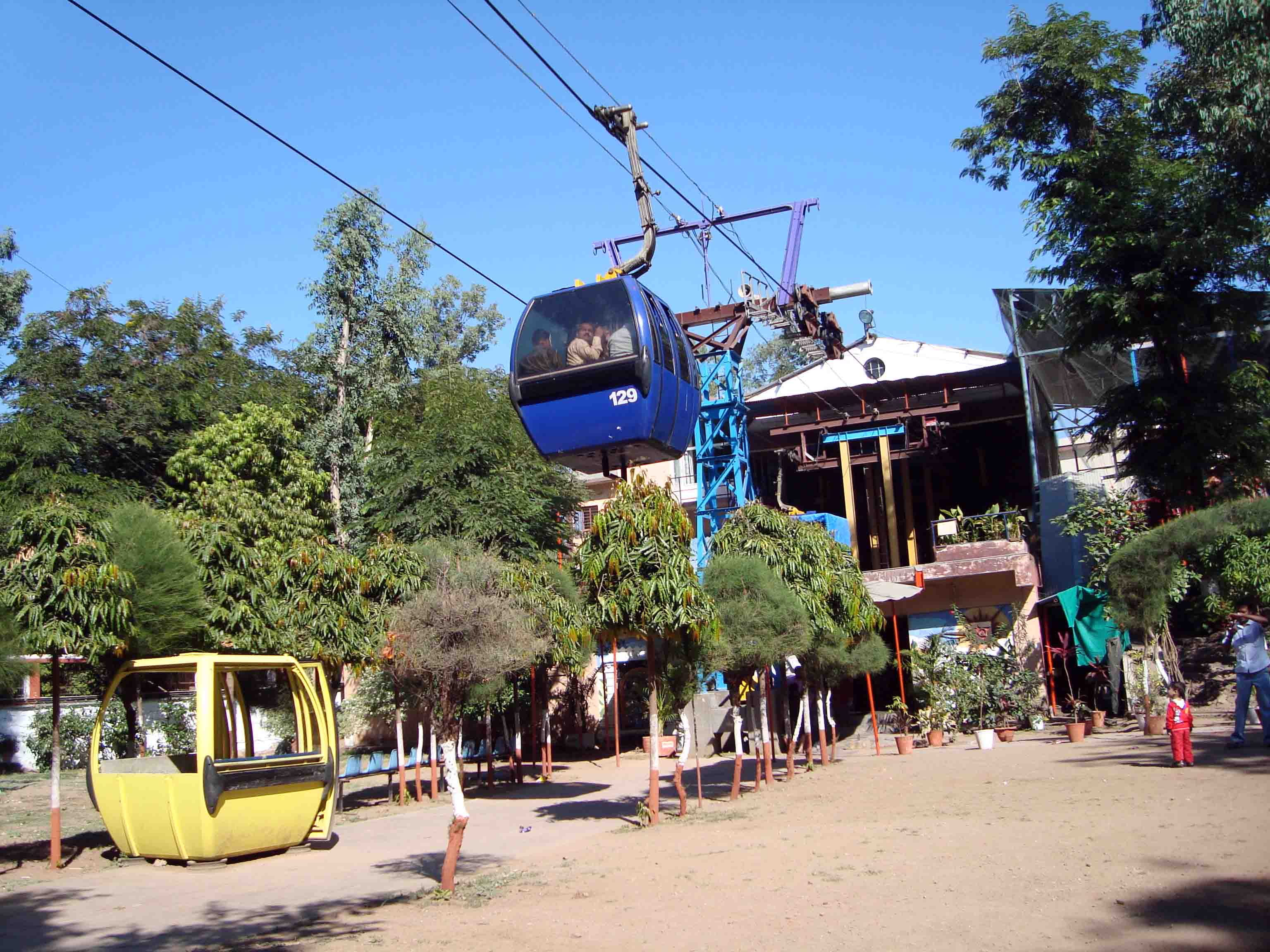
- Pavagadh ropeway line

- Location within Gujarat
- Interactive map of Pavagadh ropeway

Overview
- Other name: Maa Mahakalika Udan Khatola
- Character: Recreational
- Location: Pavagadh
- Country: India
- Coordinates: 22.467142°N 73.523135°E
- Termini: Ground Station (Manchi Haveli); Top Station
- No. of stations: 2
- Services: Pavagadh, Gujarat
- Built by: Usha Breco Limited
- Open: 1986; 40 years ago
- Website: ushabreco.com

Operation
- Owner: Usha Breco Limited
- Operator: Usha Breco Limited
- No. of carriers: 10
- Carrier capacity: 6 passengers
- Ridership: 400 per hour 13,00,000 per year
- Operating times: 6:00 am to 6:45 pm
- Trip duration: 6 minutes
- Fare: ₹150 (US$1.60) (2025)

Technical features
- Aerial lift type: Mono-cable gondola detachable
- Line length: 774 metres (2,539 ft)
- No. of cables: 1
- Vertical Interval: 297 metres (970 ft)

Pavagadh ropeway is a ropeway on Pavagadh hill in Pavagadh, Panchmahal district, Gujarat, India. It was opened in 1986.

== History ==
Pavagadh hill is a major pilgrim site because of presence of the Kalika Mata Temple, a Shakta pitha, as well as tourism site due to the presence of several monuments of Champaner-Pavagadh Archaeological Park, a UNESCO World Heritage Site.

Pavagadh ropeway was opened in 1986. The construction and operation is managed by Usha Breco Limited.

On 19 January 2003, seven people were killed and 24 were injured in a ropeway accident. On 6 September 2025, six people were killed after a cargo ropeway cable snaps midway.

== Technical features ==
Pavagadh ropeway, 774 metres (2,539 ft) in length, is said to be the country's highest then. It operates mono-cable gondola detachable type lifts. A trip takes 6 minutes.

It takes passengers 297 metres (970 ft) above the Pavagadh hill from Manchi Haveli. From there, the passenger has to climb 250 metres (820 ft) to reach the temple. It has a capacity to carry 1250 passengers per hour but operates at capacity of 400 passengers per hour. It transports 13 lakh passengers annually.

There is a proposal of new 250 metres (820 ft)-long ropeway which will take passengers further and alight them 30-40m from the temple.

== See also ==
- Jain temples, Pavagadh
- Aerial lift in India
- Girnar ropeway
- Ambaji ropeway
- Saputara ropeway
