= Girnar ropeway =

Sky tram in Gujarat, India

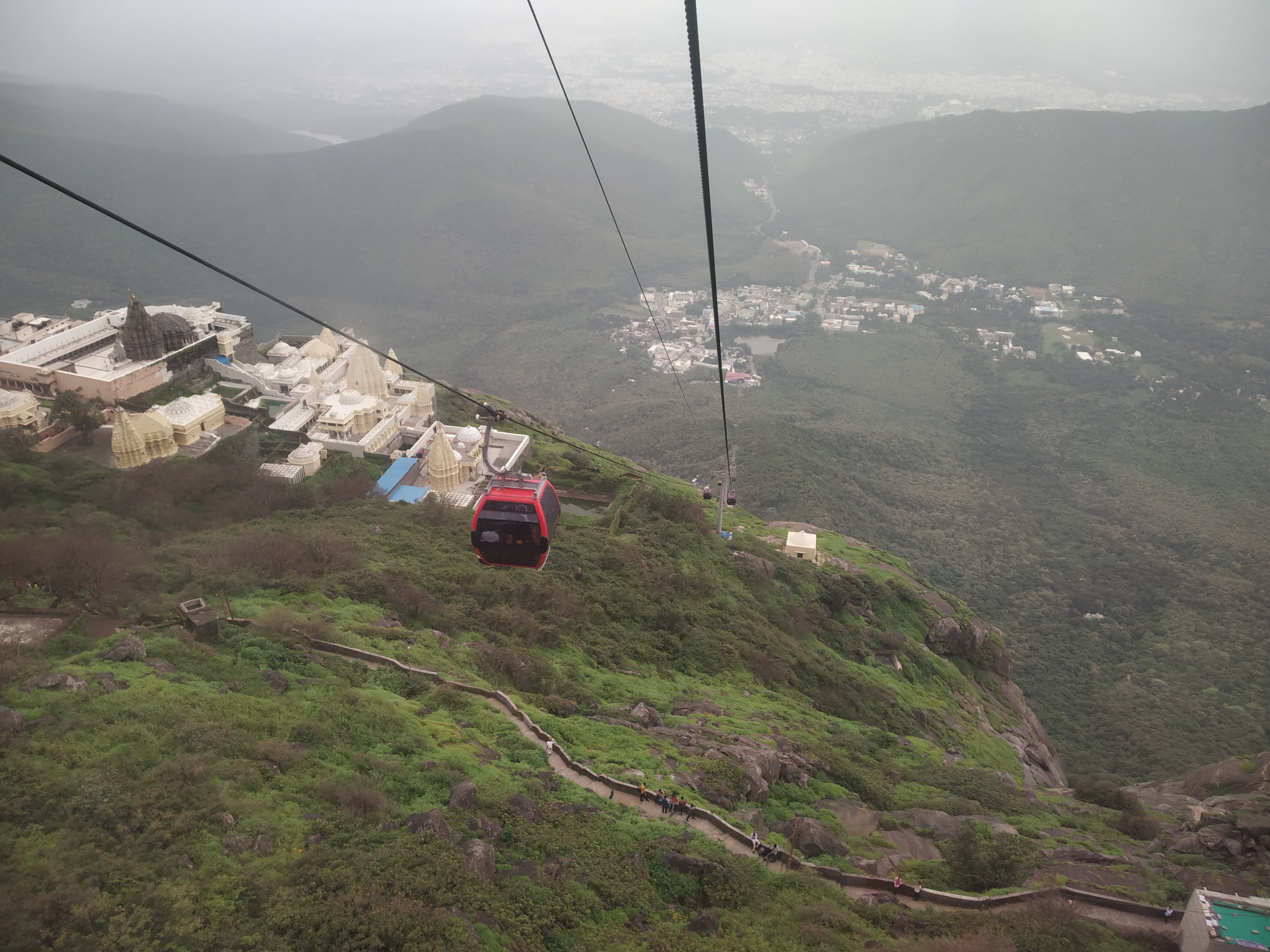
- Girnar and city view from ropeway

- Location within Gujarat
- Interactive map of Girnar ropeway

Overview
- Other name: Girnar Udankhatola
- Character: Recreational
- Location: Bhavnath Taleti, Junagadh
- Country: India
- Coordinates: 21.52702°N 70.506085°E
- Termini: Bhavnath Taleti; Ambaji Temple
- Elevation: lowest: 168m highest: 1066m
- No. of stations: 2
- Services: Junagadh, Gujarat
- Built by: Usha Breco Limited
- Construction cost: ₹130 crore (US$13 million)
- Construction begin: September 2018
- Open: 24 October 2020; 5 years ago
- Website: udankhatola.com

Operation
- Owner: Usha Breco Limited
- Operator: Usha Breco Limited
- No. of carriers: 25
- Carrier capacity: 8 passengers
- Ridership: 8000 daily
- Trip duration: 7.43 minutes
- Fare: ₹700 (US$7.30) (normal) ₹400 (US$4.20) (concessional)

Technical features
- Aerial lift type: Mono-cable gondola detachable
- Manufactured by: Doppelmayr/Garaventa Group
- Line length: 2,126.40 metres (6,976.4 ft)
- No. of support towers: 9
- No. of cables: 1
- Cable diameter: 50 mm
- Installed power: 1000 kVA
- Operating speed: 6 m/s
- Vertical Interval: 900 metres (3,000 ft)

Girnar ropeway

Girnar ropeway is a ropeway on Mount Girnar in Junagadh district, Gujarat, India. First proposed in 1983, the construction started only in September 2018 due to government approval delays and litigation. The construction and operation is managed by Usha Breco Limited. It was inaugurated on 24 October 2020.

== History ==
Mount Girnar is a major pilgrim site because of the presence of the Ambika Jain temple, the Neminath shrine, and many Hindu temples as well as several Jain temples.

The project was first proposed by the Gujarat Tourism in 1983 which suggested the diversion of about 9.1 hectares (22 acres) of forest land. The Government of Gujarat finalised diversion of 7.29 hectares (18.0 acres) of forest land in 1994 and the compensatory forest land was granted near Toraniya village. The Government of India granted permission of the project in 1995.

The project was delayed when the palanquin-bearers, who carried pilgrims up the mountain, opposed the project and petitioned the Gujarat High Court regarding its jeopardization of their livelihood. The petition was dismissed after the company constructing the ropeway, Usha Breco Limited, agreed for compensatory livelihood. As of 2020, a total of 104 shops for palanquin-bearers that were affected by the project are being constructed in the parking lot of the lower terminal. After objections from the environmental activists, the construction was further stopped in 1999.

The work resumed in 2002 after sorting the objections, and the land was acquired in 2007. Then state Chief Minister Narendra Modi laid the foundation stone. As the project was located within the Girnar Wildlife Sanctuary and National Park, the wildlife clearance was granted by the National Board for Wildlife in 2011 while the environmental clearance was granted by the Ministry of Environment, Forest and Climate Change of India in 2016.

The proposed alignment of the ropeway was considered a risk to local endangered long-billed vultures. A Public Interest Litigation regarding it was filed in 2017 and was dismissed by the Gujarat High Court in 2020.

The construction was restarted in September 2018. The project was projected to open in May 2020 but was further delayed due to the COVID-19 pandemic. Trial runs were carried out in September 2020 and the construction was completed on 17 October 2020. The project was inaugurated on 24 October 2020 by now Prime Minister Narendra Modi.

== Technical features ==
The ropeway is 2,320 metres (7,600 ft) long. It was constructed at the cost of ₹130 crore (equivalent to ₹162 crore or US$17 million in 2023) which included the construction of the lower and upper terminals as well as nine poles supporting the rope. It operates mono-cable gondola detachable type lifts. It takes passengers 850 metres (2,800 ft) up the hill to the Ambika temple. It has 25 trolleys with a capacity of eight passengers each. It can carry up to 1000 passengers per hour but currently operates at capacity of 800 passengers per hour and 8000 per day. The trip takes 7.43 minutes.

== See also ==
- Aerial lift in India
- Pavagadh ropeway
- Ambaji ropeway
- Saputara ropeway
