= 900 Kandi =

Place in Wayanad

Thollayiram Kandi
- Location in Kerala, India Thollayiram Kandi (India)
- Coordinates: 11.55786°N 76.13199°E
- Country: India
- State: Kerala
- District: Wayanad

Languages
  - Official: Malayalam, English
- Time zone: UTC+5:30 (IST)

900 Kandi (Thollayiram Kandi) is a tourist destination located in Meppadi village of Wayanad district, Kerala. Thollayiram in local parlance means “900” and Kandi means “a patch of land". It is one of the hidden areas in the forest of Wayanad and are not visited by many tourists. The off-road trekking through the middle of the forest and a glass bridge located here are the major attraction at 900 Kandi.

== Overview ==
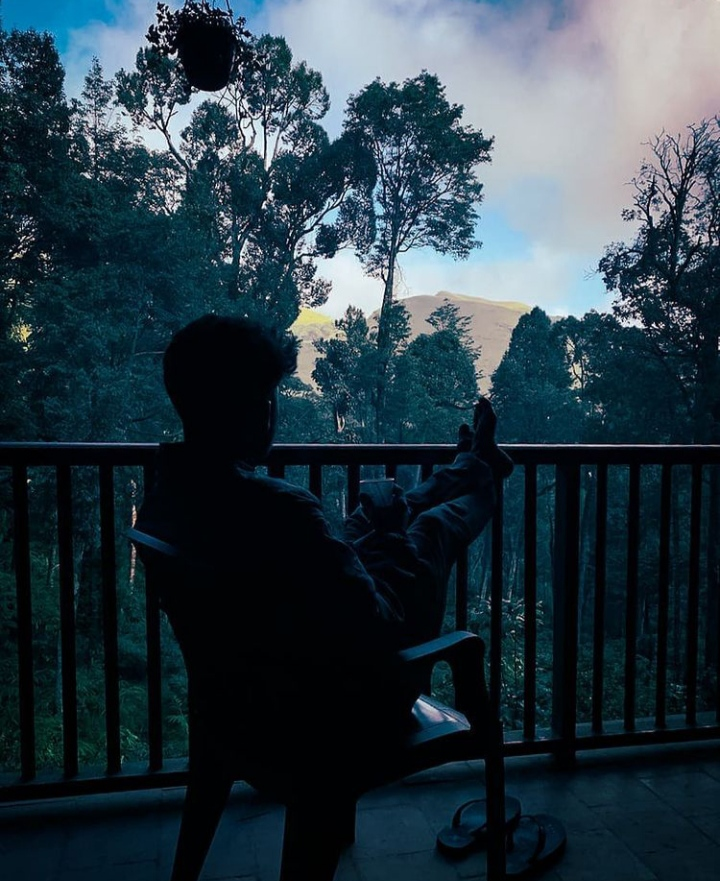
A view of 900 Kandi from a resort

900 Kandi was mostly unknown to common people until the release of Lord Livingstone 7000 Kandi in 2015, which was shot here. In the local language 'Kandi' means a field. 900 Kandi is the name of the estate situated within the forest land. It lies within the dense forests of Wayanad. The 900 acres of land here was a farm belonging to one of the settlers, Parel Pappanchan(TK Mathew), decades ago. After that, this area was called as 900 Kandi. Despite the area's farmland has expanded beyond 900 acres, the name still lives on. Spread over acres of estates and forest lands, the journey to 900 Kandi is through the forests.

== Location ==
The journey to 900 Kandi begins beyond the first bridge after Kalladi Maqam on the way from Meppadi to Soochipara Falls. 900 Kandi is located at a distance of 14 km from Meppadi. Bus facility is available to Meppadi which is 12 km from Kalpatta town. Private jeep services are available from Meppadi to 900 Kandi. The nearest railway station from Meppadi is Kozhikode station which is 78 km away and the nearest airport is Calicut International Airport, which is 87 km away.

== See also ==
- List of Glass Bridge Skywalks in India
