= Don, Dang =

Don
- Village
- 20°42.76928', 073°49.09832' Don (India)
- Coordinates: 20°42′46.1″N 73°49′5.9″E
- Country: India
- State: Gujarat
- District: Dang District
- Elevation: 1,000 m (3,300 ft)

Population (2001)
  - Total: 1,200 (estimated)

Languages
  - Official: Gujarati
- Time zone: UTC+5:30 (IST)
- PIN: 394710
- Telephone code: +02631
- Vehicle registration: GJ30

Don is a hill station and village in Dang district of Gujarat, India. It is touted to be the second hill station in state after nearby Saputara.

== Geography ==
Don is situated on a plateau in the Dang forest area of Western Ghats (Sahyadri) range at an altitude of about 1000 meters, higher than the nearby Saputara. It is located 33 km from Ahwa and 55 km from Saputara. Earlier the hill station was 85 km away but the distance was shortened after the construction of a new road in 2013.

== Tourism ==
The village has a pleasant low temperature climate throughout the year. The hill station is rich in bio-diversity. There is a hillock named after Dronacharya. There are waterfalls and caves near Pandav village on the approach. Monsoon season brings the most number of tourists to Don Hill Station. After October, the weather gets hot and number of tourists drop significantly until the following Jun

== Vulture Point ==
As the name suggests, Vulture Point is a notable spot for observing vultures and other raptors. The area provides a rare opportunity to see these majestic birds in their natural habitat, soaring above the cliffs.
