= Vishwa Shanti Stupa, Rajgir =

Indian peace pagoda

Shanti Stupa
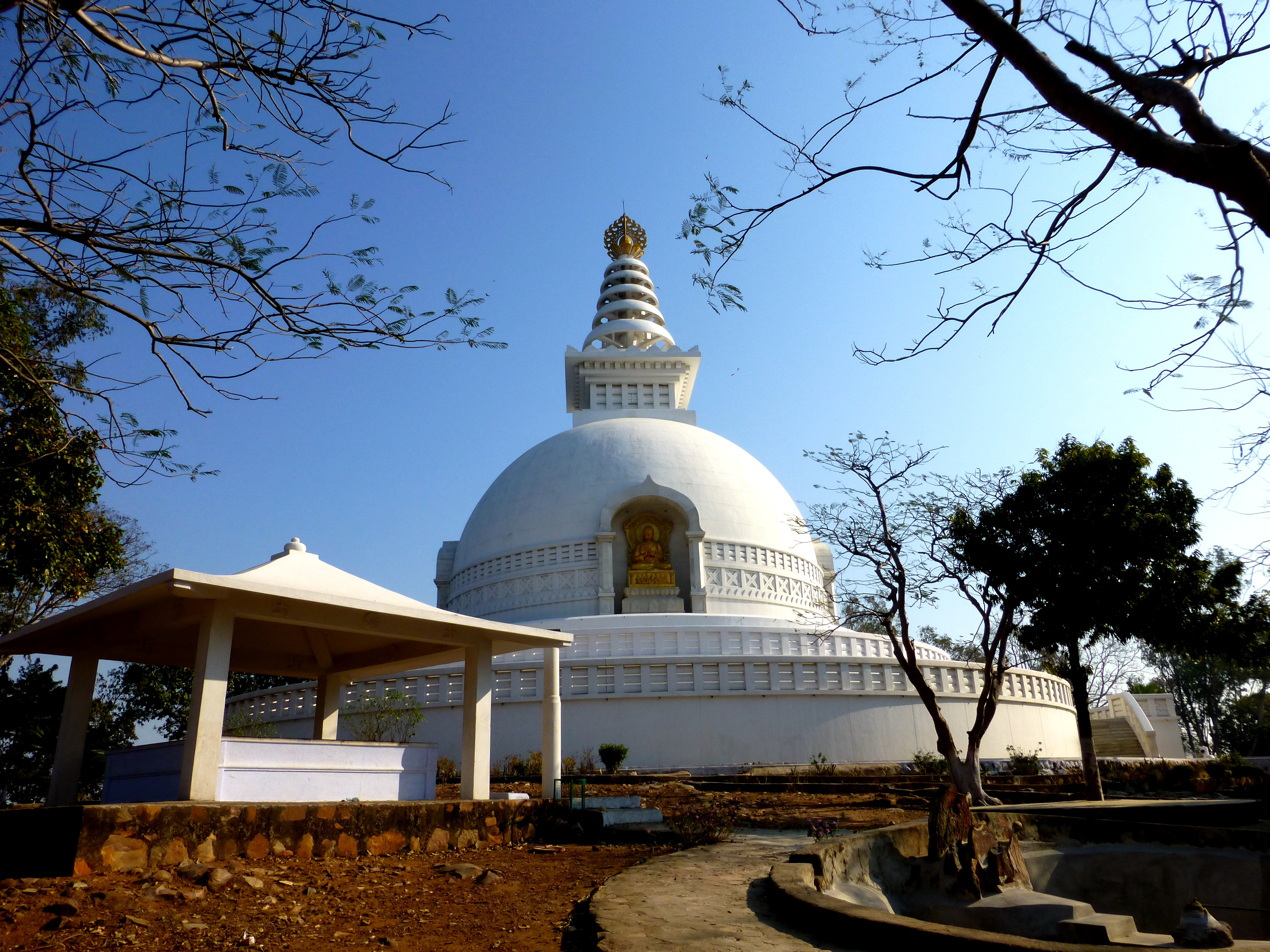

Religion
- Affiliation: Tibetan Buddhism

Location
- Location: Ratnagiri Hills, Rajgir, Nalanda District, Bihar, India
- Country: India
- Interactive map of Shanti Stupa
- Coordinates: IN-BR 25°00′44″N 85°44′45″E

Architecture
- Founder: Nichidatsu Fujii
- Established: 1969

Vishwa Shanti Stupa ('World Peace Stupa') is a large white Peace Pagoda in Rajgir, Nalanda District, Bihar, near Gitai Mandir. Statues of the Buddha are mounted on the stupa in four directions. It also has a small Japanese Buddhist temple with a large park. There is a temple near the stupa where prayers are conducted for universal peace. The initial pagoda was completed in 1969. New initiatives in 1993 resulted in the present form. It is one of around 80 Peace Pagodas which have been built around the world by the neo-Buddhist organisation Nipponzan Myohoji. This was a dream of Nichidatsu Fujii, inspired by Mohandas K. Gandhi, as a reaction to the atomic bombing of Japan, the first, and more well known, Vishwa Shanti stupa, being built on Ratnagiri Hill in Rajgir.

== The Stupa ==
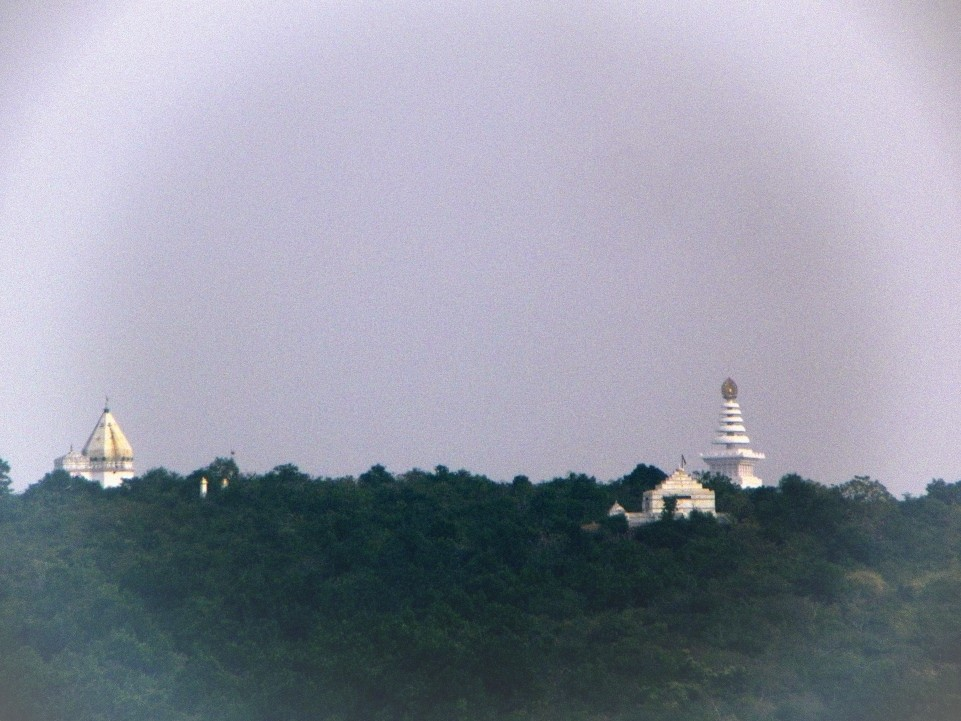

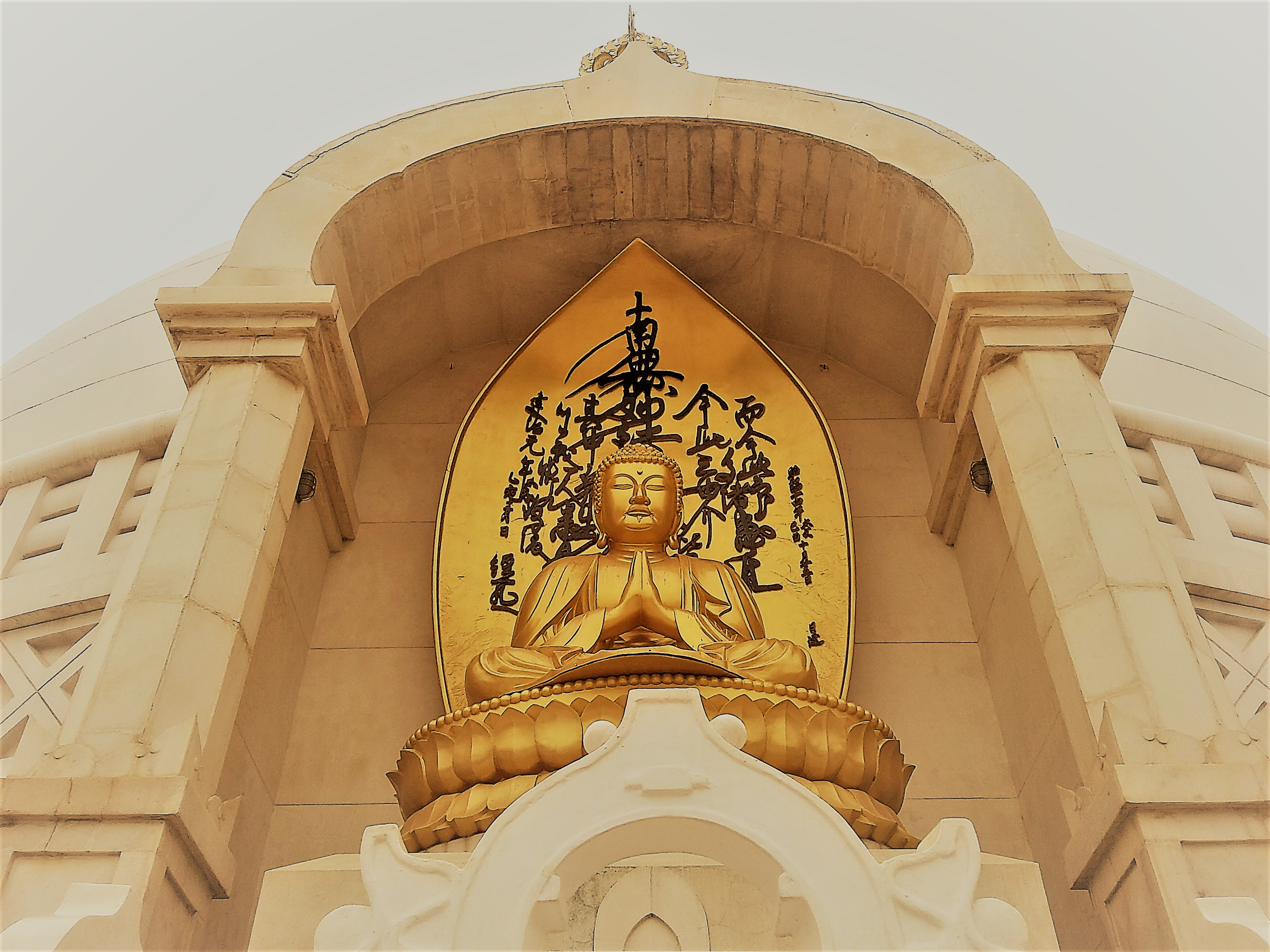

Located on about the top of the 400 m high Rajgir Hills in the lush-green valley of Rajgir, the white stupa stands 120 ft tall with a total diameter of 103 ft. The stupa is studded with four gold gilded statues of Buddha, showing four important events of his life. This stupa was constructed by Mackintosh Burn Limited, a renowned PSU construction company under the Government of West Bengal.

== Portrayals in popular culture ==
- 1970: The song "O Mere Raja" from the Hindi film Johny Mera Naam features the stupa and the single-seat ropeway to the peak.
