= Neemach Mata Temple =

Neemuch Mata
- Location of Neemach Mata Temple in Rajasthan and India. Neemach Mata Temple (India)

Religion
- Affiliation: Hinduism
- Festivals: Navratri, Diwali

Location
- Location: Udaipur
- State: Rajasthan
- Country: India
- Coordinates: 24°36′36″N 73°40′41″E

Specifications
- Temple: 1
- Elevation: 900 m (2,953 ft)

Neemach Mata Temple is located on a hill on the banks of the Fateh Sagar Lake in the city of Udaipur, Rajasthan, India. This temple is located on a green hill in the Dewali (pronounced Dey-vaa-lee) area of Udaipur. It has both stairs and uphill slope walk way to climb, which is around 900 metres long. It enshrines the stone idol of Neemach Mata Devi. There is also an idol of Lord Ganesh and three west-facing lions of stone.

== History ==
Neemach Mata is the kuldevi of Dakot khandan of Bhatnagar(kayasth)and all the dakot family assemble on the occasion of Haryali amavsya and perform the pooja every year. The temple is in memory of 'devi' who came in front of a devotee on the hill here. Complete story is written on the poster depicted in the temple, the photo of same is placed below.

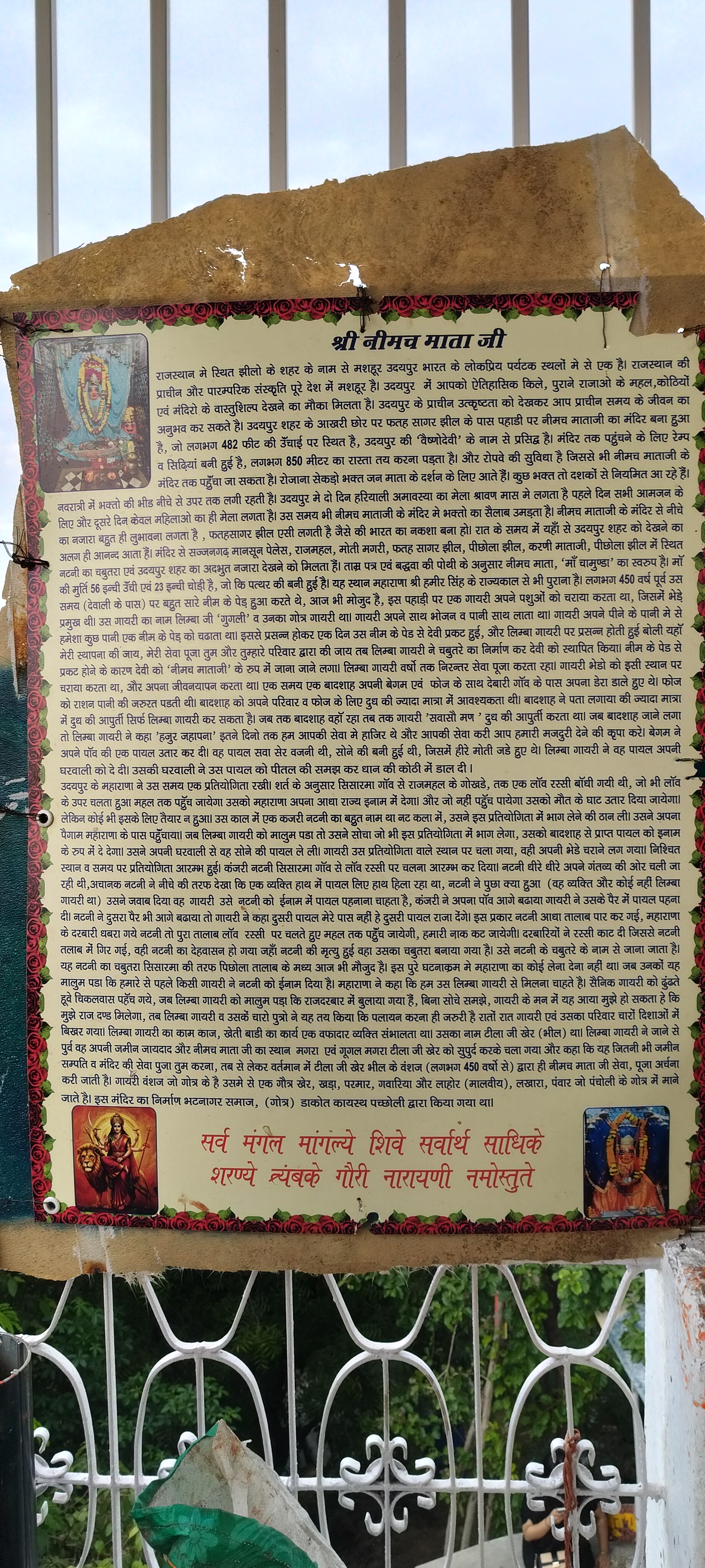
Poster depicting history of Mata

== Access & Facilities ==
On 22 January 2024, a state of the art Monocable Ropeway service was inaugurated for pilgrims to easily visit the temple. The facilities at the ropeway building to go the temple include wheelchairs, washrooms, massage chairs, traditional Rajasthani costume photography, Game zone for kids, Sunset point with awesome views at upper terminal of ropeway and a multi-cuisine cafe called "Yummy Eats" at the lower terminal. There is free parking available for all ropeway customers opposite Fatehsagar lake in the Ropeway compound. The 2-way journey is priced at Rs.165 for children above 3 years and upto 100 cm and 220 per person for all else w.e.f. 19th Feb 2026.

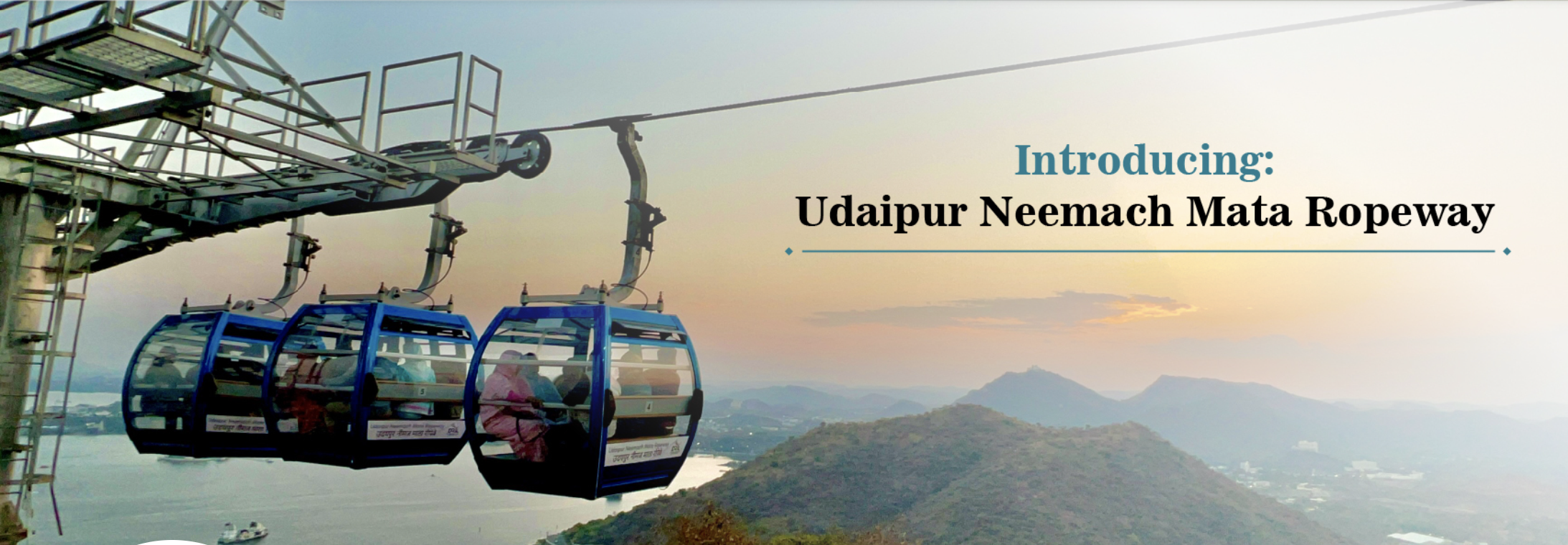
Neemuch Mata Ropeway

== Geography ==
The temple is located at the banks of Fatehsagar Lake.This temple is located on a green hill in the Dewali (pronounced Dey-vaa-lee) area of Udaipur. It has both stairs and uphill slope walk way to climb, which is around 900 metres long.

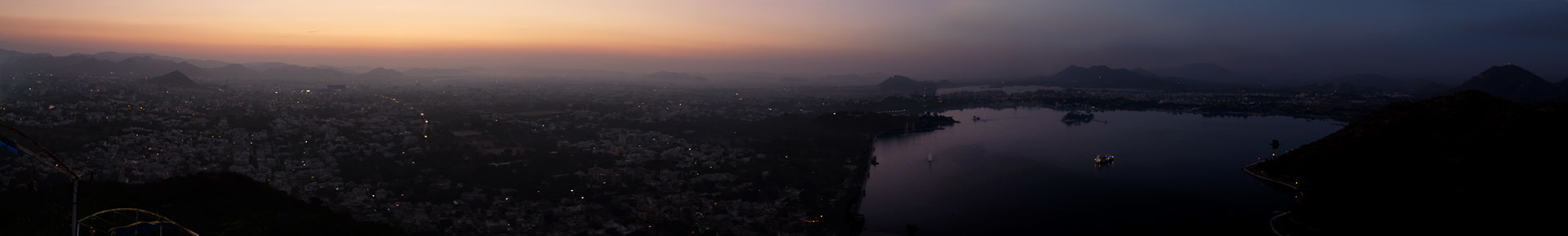
View from Neemach Mata Temple at dawn
