= Saputara =

- Hill station
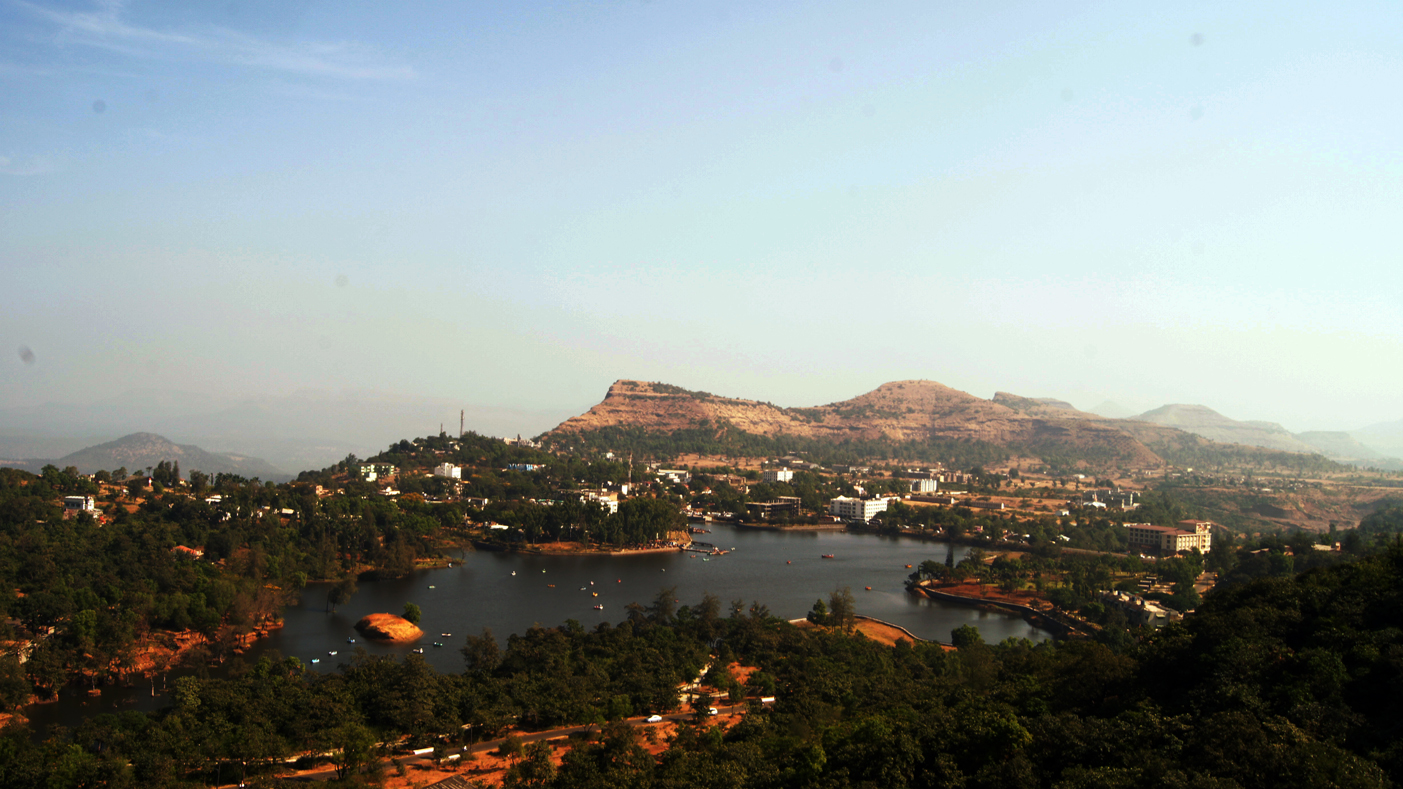
- View of Saputara Hill station

- Location in Gujarat
- Coordinates: 20°34′47″N 73°44′48″E
- Country: India
- State: Gujarat
- District: Dang District
- Elevation: 900 m (3,000 ft)

Population (2011)
  - Total: 2,968
  - Density: 3,151/km^{2} (8,160/sq mi)

Languages
  - Official: Gujarati
- Time zone: UTC+5:30 (IST)
- PIN: 394720
- Telephone code: +02631
- Vehicle registration: GJ-30

Saputara is a hill station in the Dang district of Gujarat, India. It is a well-known tourist destination located in the Sahyadris or Western Ghats.

== Notable sites ==
Places to visit in and around Saputara are Saputara Lake, Sunset Point, Sunrise Point, Echo Point, The SaputaraTribal Museum and Hathgadh Fort.

Vansda National Park is located around 69 kms from Saputara.

== Climate ==
The winter season begins in October and goes on till February. Though the winter temperature in Saputara can drop as low as 8 °C, overall, the weather remains quite enjoyable. The maximum temperature here during the winter is 28 °C.

== Demographics ==
As per 2011 census of India, the Saputara notified area has population of 2,968 of which 1,031 are males while 1,937 are females. The literacy rate of Saputara is 87.4%. Thus Saputara has higher literacy rate compared to 75.2% of The Dangs district. The male literacy rate is 89.73% and the female literacy rate is 86.29% in Saputara.

== Transportation ==
Saputara lies on National Highway 953 which connects to Songadh in Gujarat and Pimpalgaon Baswant in Maharashtra.

== Gallery ==
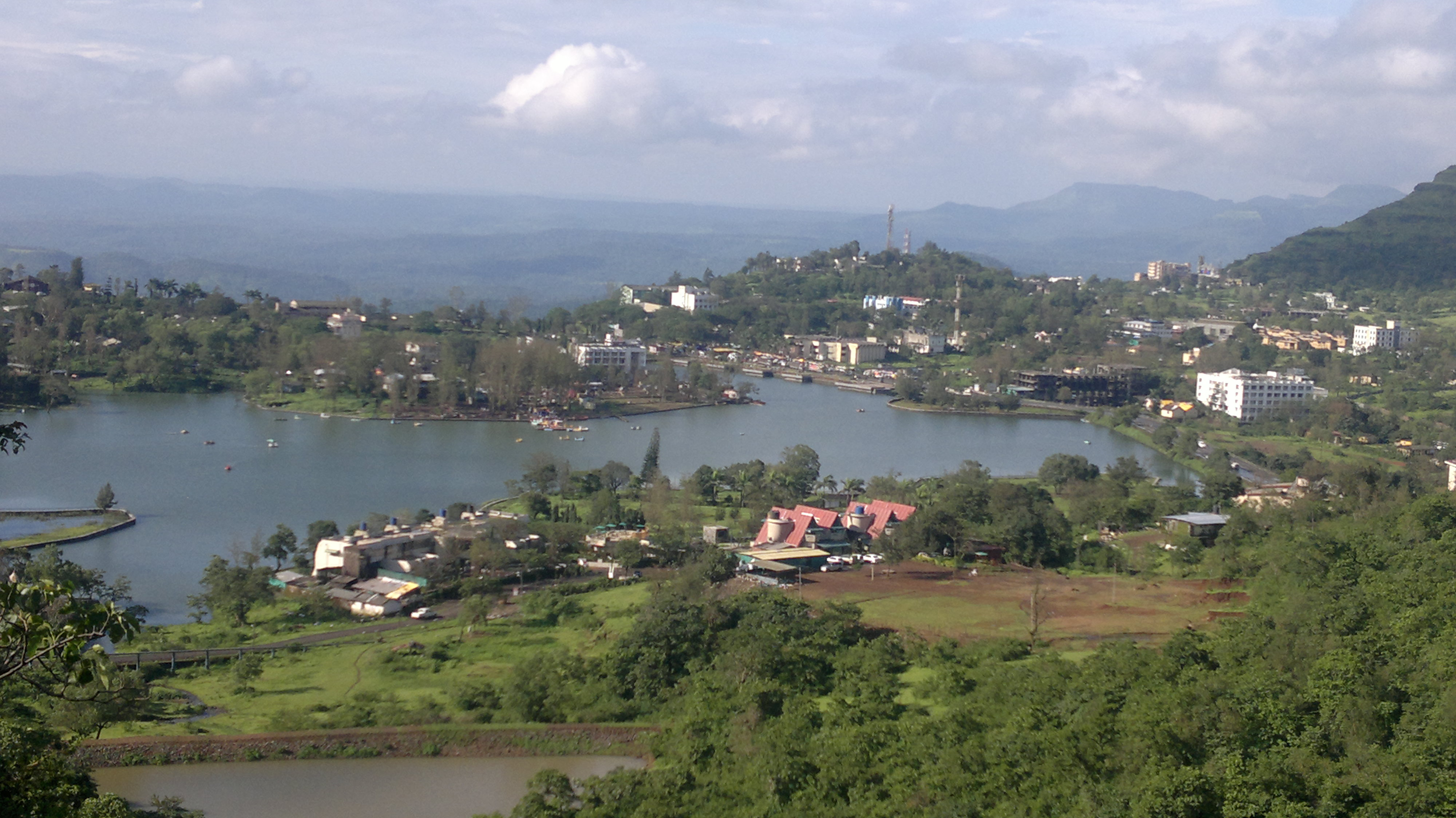
View of Saputara Hill station

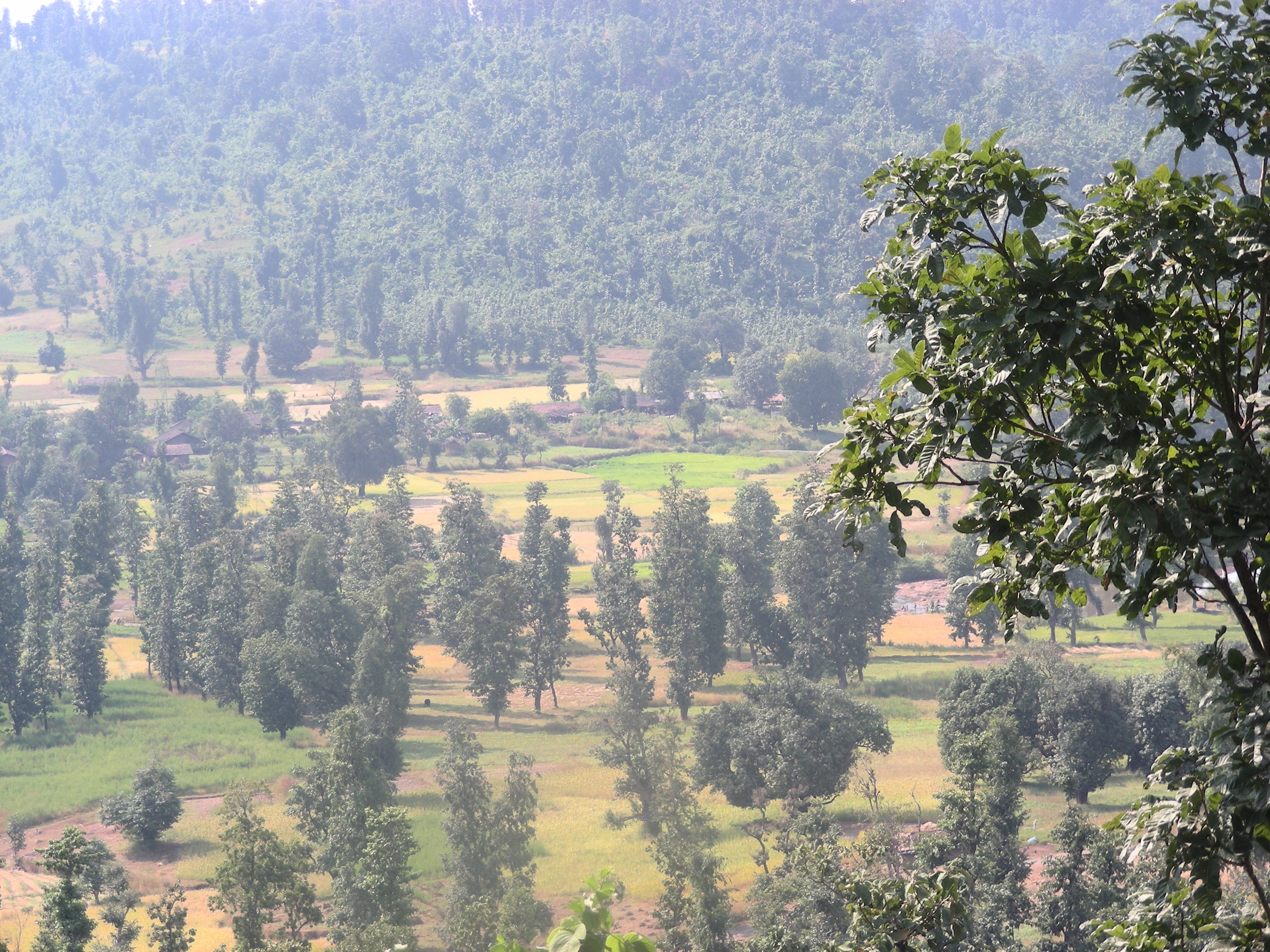
Valley view

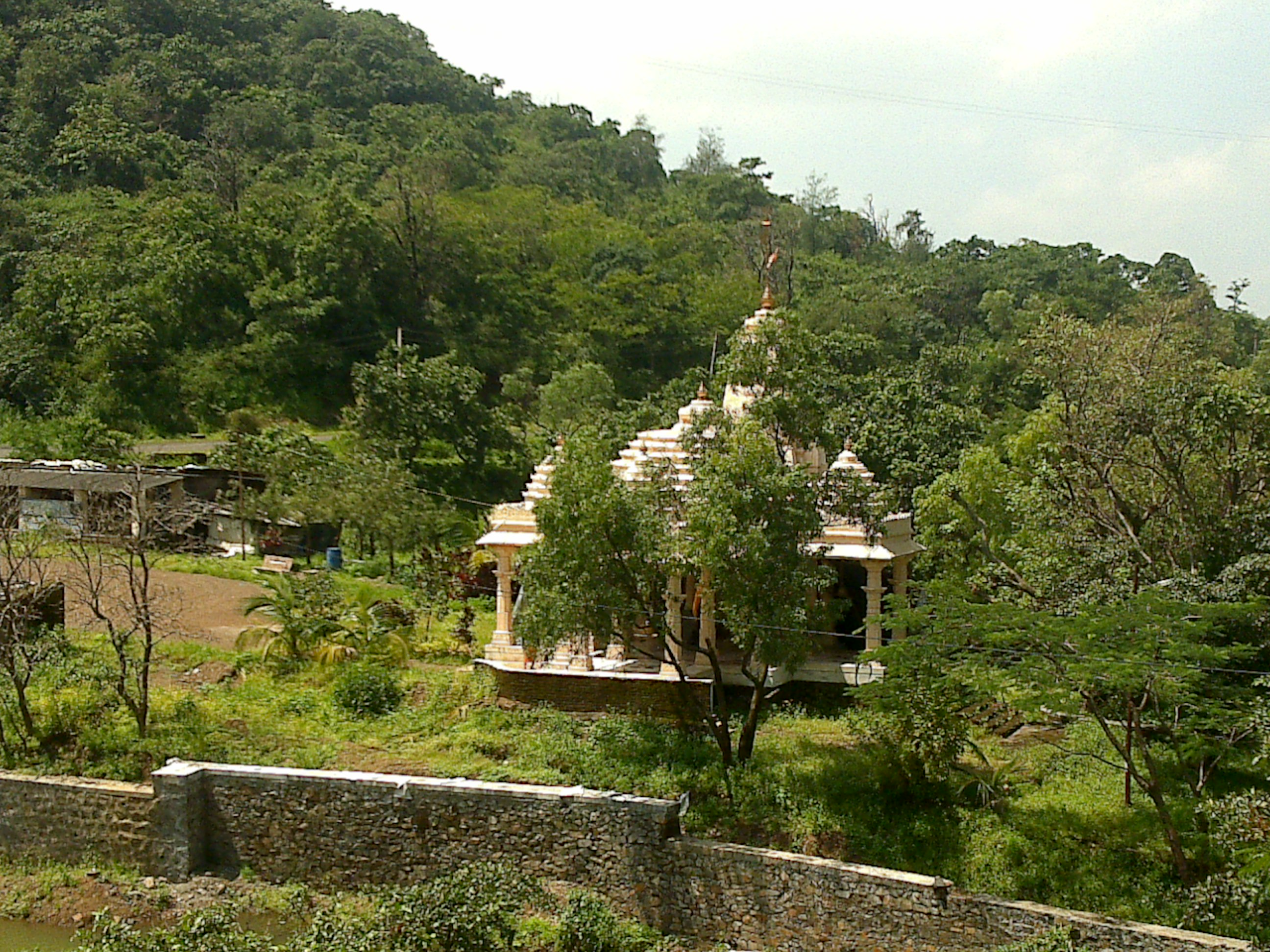
Nageshwar Temple

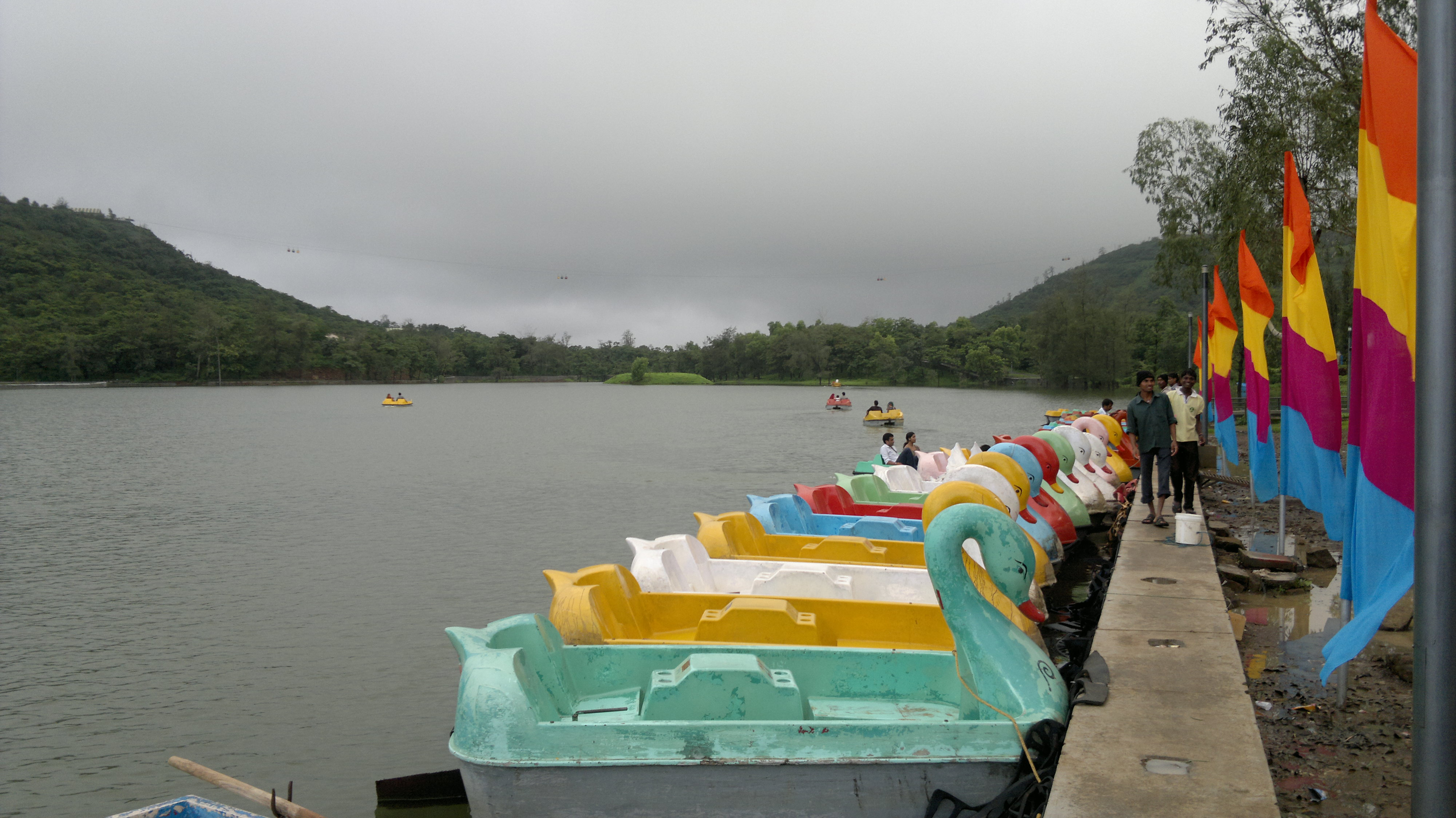
Boats at Saputara Lake

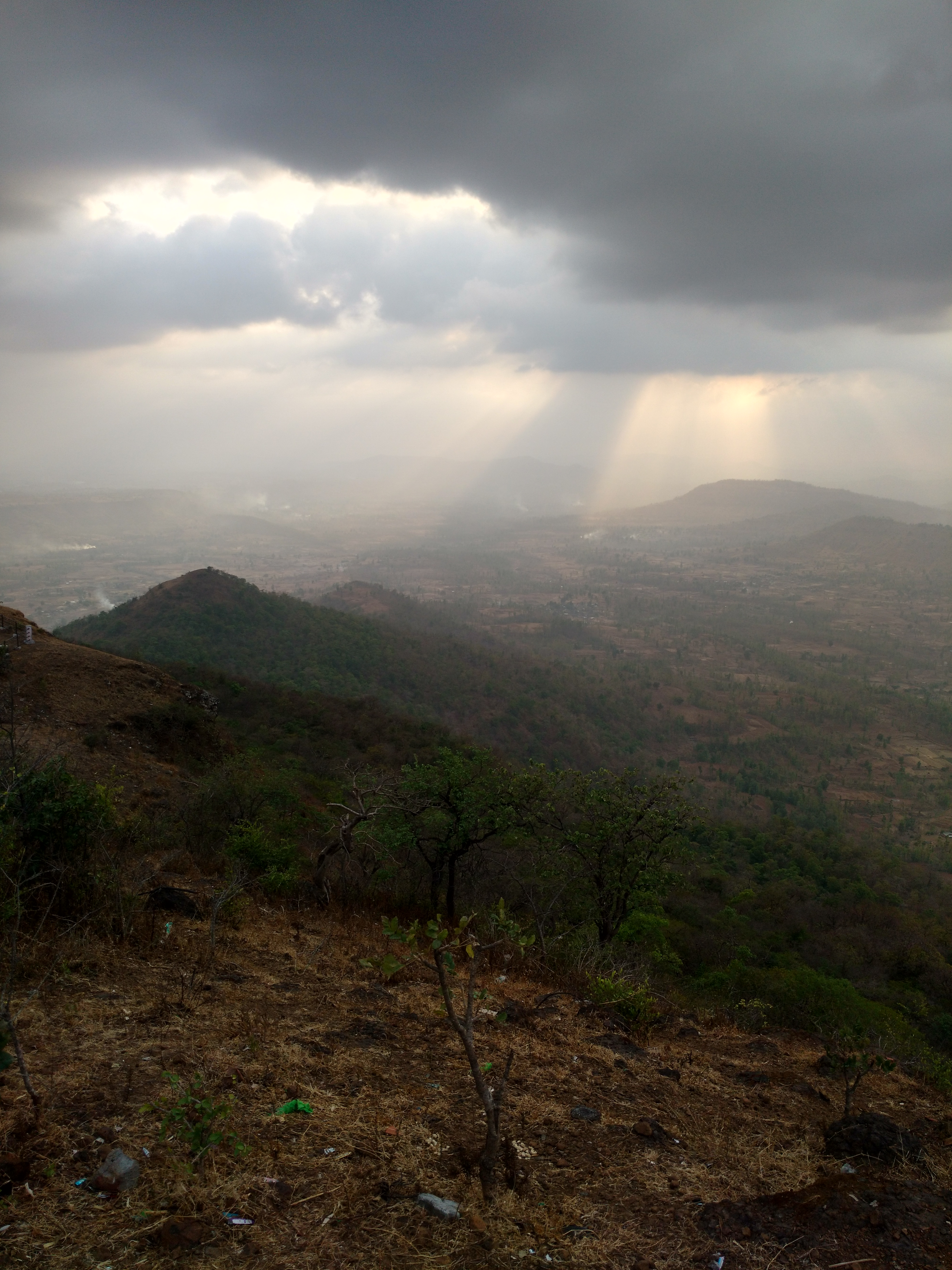
A View from Sunset Point Saputara Hill Station

== See also ==
- Kim River
