= RORO ferries in India =

RORO ferry services in India include the following, many others are under implementation or planning phases.

== List ==
=== Assam ===
- Majuli island in Brahmaputra River: 2 vessels operate on National Waterway 2 (NW2) by Inland Waterways Authority of India (IWAR) with capacity of 200 passenger, 4 cars and 2 trucks.
- Pandu Port (Guwahati) across Brahmaputra River: 1 vessel operates on NW2 by IWAR with capacity of 200 passenger, 4 cars and 2 trucks.
- Dhubri Port across Brahmaputra River: 1 vessel operates on NW2 by IWAR with capacity of 200 passenger, 4 cars and 2 trucks.
- Karimganj - Bangladesh over Barak River:

=== Gujarat ===
- Dahej and Hazira in Gulf of Khambhat: Discontinued in early 2020. Restarted for passengers only in March 2021.
- DG Sea Connect: Ghogha (Bhavnagar district in Saurashtra) to Hazira (Surat district: The all-weather Ropax ferry, which can carry 550 passengers, 30 trucks, 7 smaller trucks, and 100 two-wheelers, reduces the 370-km road distance which takes 12 hours to 60-km sea route which takes 4 hours.

=== Goa ===
Was in the implementation phase in 2017.

=== India-Bangladesh ===
- Karimganj - Bangladesh over Barak River .

=== Kerala ===
- Kochi & Kozhikode: It opened in November 2020.

=== Maharashtra ===
- Ferry Wharf (Mumbai) - Mandwa (Alibag in Raigad district).

Operated since 2018 which cuts Ferry Wharf-Mandwa and Ferry Wharf-Mandwa-Goa travel time by 3 hours. Ferry Wharf to Alibag travel by road takes 4 hours, which is en route to Goa. Ferry from Ferry Wharf to Mandwa Jetty will take 30 minutes, and from Mandwa Jetty it takes further 45 to drive to Alibag from where travelers can drive to Goa.

- Nerul (Navi Mumbai): It was in the implementation phase in 2017.

=== West Bengal ===
- Kolkata to Northeast India .

== See also ==
- Multi-Modal Logistics Parks in India
- List of national waterways in India
- Sagar Mala project
- Setu Bharatam
- UDAN
