= Sissiborgaon =

- Township
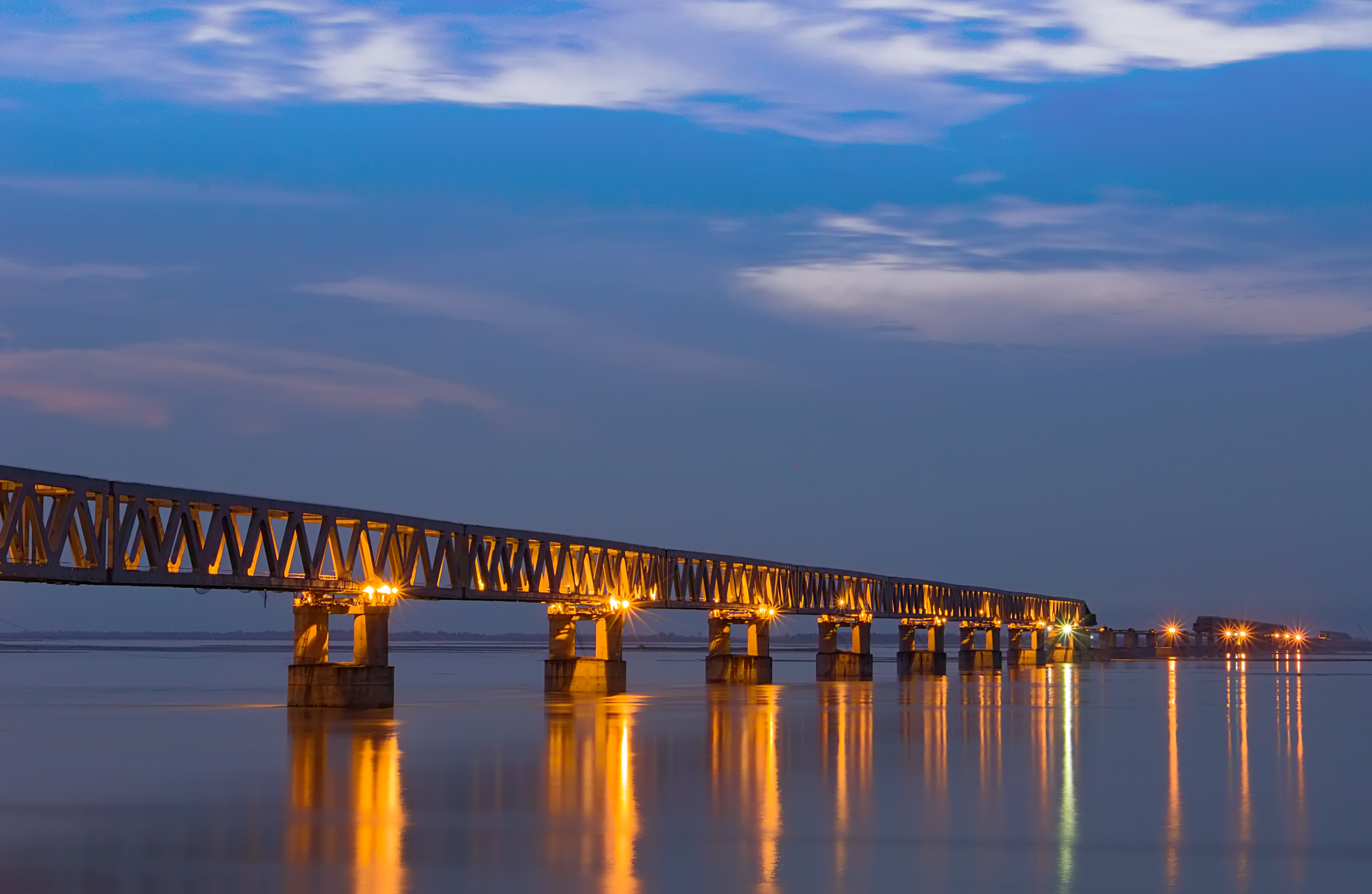
- Nicknames: Bor Gaon
- Interactive map of Sissiborgaon
- Country: India
- State: Assam
- Region: Upper Assam
- District: Dhemaji district

Government
  - Body: Sissiborgaon Gaon Panchayat

Area
  - Total: 998.01 km^{2} (385.33 sq mi)
- Time zone: UTC+5:30 (IST)
- PIN: 787 XXX
- Telephone code: +91 - (0) 361 - XX XX XXX
- Official language: Assamese

Sissiborgaon is a village and tehsil of Dhemaji district, Assam state, India. Sissiborgaon is a populated developed village.

== Location ==
According to Census 2011 information the location code or village code of Sissiborgaon village is 288939. Sissiborgaon village is located in Sissibargaon Tehsil of Dhemaji district in Assam, India. It is situated 22 km away from district headquarter. Sissiborgaon is the sub-district headquarter of Sissiborgaon village. As per 2009 stats, Sissiborgaon village is also a gram panchayat.

== Sengajan multimodal waterways terminal ==
Sengajan multimodal waterways terminal on Brahmaputra National Waterway 2 in Sissiborgaon tehsil is part of Bharatmala and Sagarmala projects. There are 19 National Waterways for the Northeast connectivity.

== Banking service ==
- State Bank Of India
- Assam Gramin Vikash Bank

== Education ==
=== Colleges ===
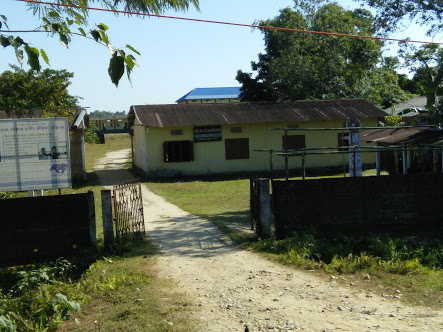
Entrance of Sissiborgaon College

- Sissiborgaon College
- Sissiborgaon Junior College
- Sissiborgaon Science College

=== Schools ===
- Sissiborgaon M.V. School.
- Sissiborgaon Higher Secondary School.
- Sissiborgaon girls High School
- Sissiborgaon girls M.E. School
- Sankardev Sishu/Vidya Niketan, Sissiborgaon
- Vivekananda Kendra Vidyalaya
- Sissiborgaon English Academy
- Gelua M.P. High School
- Mising Janajatiyo M.E. School

== Religion ==
A large majority of the people in the region follow Hinduism, while there are only 3% of Muslims and 1% of people following other faiths.

Religions in Sissiborgaon
1. Hinduism (97.0%)
2. Muslim (2.80%)
3. Others (1.20%)

== Population ==
The Sissiborgaon village has population of 728 of which 344 are males while 384 are females as per Population Census 2011. In Sissiborgaon village population of children with age 0-6 is 102 which makes up 14.01% of total population of village. Average Sex Ratio of Sissiborgaon village is 1116 which is higher than Assam state average of 958. Child Sex Ratio for the Sissiborgaon as per census is 1217, higher than Assam average of 962.

== Transportation ==
=== Road ===
The National Highway 15 passes through Sissiborgaon connecting it to Baihata Chariali and Rupai. There are also many small paths within this tehsil.

=== Railway ===
There are two railway stations in Sissiborgaon. The old one is situated in Jonai railway track and new one is situated in Bogibeel railway track.
