= Barpathar =

- town
- Location in Assam, India Barpathar (India)
- Coordinates: 26.3°N 93.87°E
- Country: India
- State: Assam
- District: Golaghat
- Elevation: 99 m (325 ft)

Population (2001)
  - Total: 7,078

Languages
  - Official: Assamese
- Time zone: UTC+5:30 (IST)
- PIN: 785602
- Vehicle registration: AS - 05 - XX - XXXX

Barpathar is a town and a municipality board in Golaghat district in the state of Assam, India.

== Geography ==
Barpathar is located at 26.3°N 93.87°E. It has an average elevation of 99 metres (324 feet) from sea level.

The river Dhanshiri flows on the south-west border of the town dividing it from the town of Old Barpathar located in the Karbi Anglong District of Assam. To the east to north flows the Doiyang river, skirting the Merapani Reserve Forest.

=== Climate ===
The climate ranges from semi-cool September–October to winter months of November to February, temperate months of March–April and sultry summer and rainy season of May to September. Average temperature ranges from 19 °C to 35 °C.

== Transport ==
=== Oriyamghat multimodal waterways terminal ===
Oriyamghat multimodal waterways terminal on Brahmaputra National Waterway 2 in Barpathar is being developed as part of Bharatmala and Sagarmala projects. There are 19 National Waterways for the Northeast connectivity.

=== Railway ===
The Lumding–Dibrugarh section railway line of Northeast Frontier Railways connecting Guwahati and Dibrugarh divides the town into two to the east and west, with Barpathar Railway Station [BXP] in the centre (parking, with toilet available).

=== Road ===
An arterial road connects Barpathar at the north-west with the District town of Golaghat located at a distance of 44 km to the north-west. The same road connects the town with the National HighWay No 36 to the west linking it by road to Guwahati.

The Uriamghat Road running parallel to the rail line on the east to south connects the town with the crude oil producing area of Uriamghat. Another goes from the east to the east-north to Rengmai on the bank of Doiyang river skirting Merapani Reserve Forest. Yet another goes from the east to the north west connecting it with Jamuguri, Furkating and then to Golaghat. The road coming to the west part of the town from Golaghat runs farther parallel to the rail line to connect it with Sarupathar in the south and then farther south to Naojan and Bokajan.

== Economy ==
=== Agriculture ===
The population is mostly agricultural, and comprises various sub-groups of Assamese speaking people: Ahoms, Sutias, Bodos, Kacharis, Misings, Kalitas, Mahantas, and Brahmins. The town has a large percentage of Bengali speaking people and a small fraction of Muslims as also Christians and Buddhists.

Greater Barpathar encompasses a cluster of well-established villages, viz., Dubarani, Baramukhia, Dhundasam, Rengmai, Premhara, Jaljori, Jorhatiya, Pabhajan, Boranagar, Hezari, Sarulangtha, Upperlangtha, Premhara, Nahorani, Sewaguri, Kordoiguri, Singimari, Dighali Pathar etc. The villages have orchards of coconuts, bananas, pineapples, betel nuts, lichees, paddy fields, sugar cane fields, etc. There is a weekly big bazaar on every Thursday at Barpathar town.

Barpathar is known as the "Granary of Sivasagar". It produces rice, sugarcane, mustards, sesame, fruits and vegetables and tea. The town has a number of tea estates, viz., Pabhajan Tea Estate, Barpathar Tea Estate, Bhuyan Bagan, Dighali Tea Estate, Rengmai Tea Estate, Singimari Tea Estate, Barpathar Tea Estate etc. During the last decade or so the Assamese peasantry has taken to growing tea in their lands thereby pushing up tea production. This has induced setting up of new factories for production of tea in the town.

=== Industry ===
The area surrounding Uriamghat produces crude oil, which, partly feeds the Numaligarh Oil Refinery. There are couple of small scale businesses like Soaponica detergent company (www.sikmik.in), Printing Industry Named Jairam Printer, Dhansiri water plant and a few incense stick factories.

== Education ==
Various educational institutions have been set up, namely, Barpathar Higher Secondary School (oldest in the Dhanshri Sub-Division of Golaghat District), Adarsha Hindi High School (Hindi), M C Dev High School (Bengali), Barpathar Girls High School, Sanskrit Vidyalaya, Industrial Training Institute (ITI) and the Barpathar College. A number of English Medium Schools - 1) Bolosing Memorial School; 2) Anjali Borbora Memorial Academy; 3) Amrit International School (CBSE); 4) Pranabananda Vidya Mandir L etc.

A Junior College and Shankardev Shishu Niketan Jatiya Viiya Vidpathar, Barpathar, have been set up in the last few years.

== Culture ==
Every village in the Town has a "namghar" where the Vaishnava followers meet in the evening to perform naam prasanga offering prayers to Lord Krishna. Various religious Bhawnas (dramas) are also performed in these namghars. Besides, there is also a Sarvajanin Mandap where Durga Puja is performed every year. Bihu Sanmilan held in April each year, in the Hindu Mmnth of Vaishakha (Assamese Bohag) draws a large number of Bihu dancing troupes to the town.

== Demographics ==
As of 2001 India census, Barpathar had a population of 7078. Males constitute 53% of the population and females 47%. Barpathar has an average literacy rate of 78%, higher than the national average of 59.5%; with 56% of the males and 44% of females literate. 12% of the population is under 6 years of age.

As per 2011 Census of India Report the Barpathar town is divided into 4 wards for which elections are held every 5 years. The Barpathar Town Committee has population of 7,657 of which 3,968 are males while 3,689 are females as per report released by Census India 2011.

The population of children aged 0–6 is 761 which is 9.94% of total population of Barpathar (TC). In Barpathar Town Committee, the female sex ratio is 930 against state average of 958. Moreover, the child sex ratio in Barpathar is around 888 compared to Assam state average of 962. The literacy rate of Barpathar city is 89.40% higher than the state average of 72.19%. In Barpathar, male literacy is around 92.57% while the female literacy rate is 86.01%.

== Notable people ==
- Lovlina Borgohain, Boxer
