= Silghat =

- city
- Location in Assam, India Silghat (India)
- Coordinates: 26°37′N 92°56′E
- Country: India
- State: Assam
- District: Nagaon

Languages
  - Official: Assamese
- Time zone: UTC+5:30 (IST)
- Vehicle registration: AS

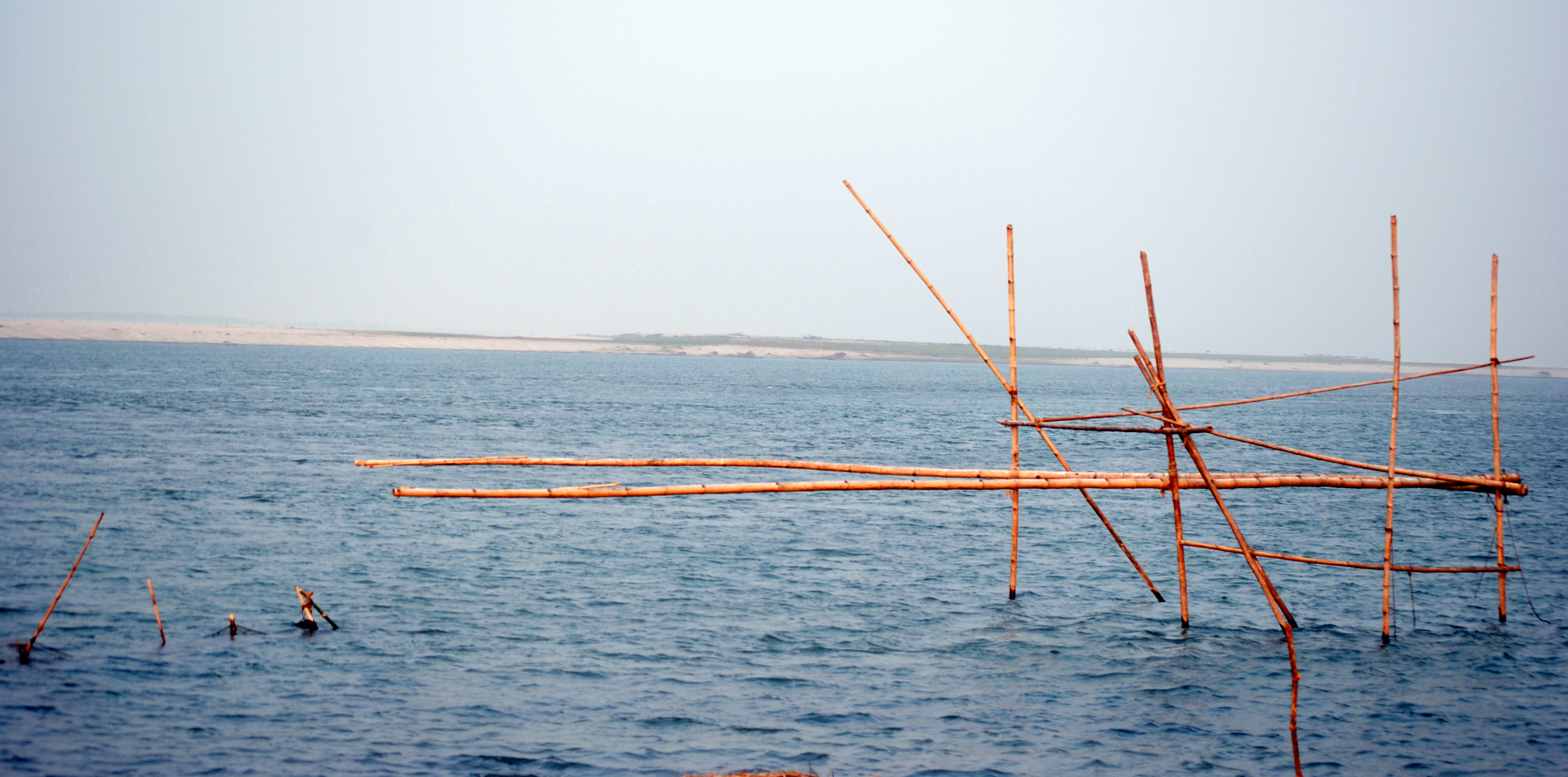
View of river Brahmaputra at Silghat

Silghat is a town located on the southern banks of the Brahmaputra, in Nagaon district in the Indian state of Assam. It is 48 km northeast of Nagaon. With a river and hills, the scenery of Silghat attracts local and visitors throughout the year. Silghat is home to Kamakhya Temple, Trishuldhari (religious cum picnic spot), Samantagiri, Simala Garh, Manuh Kata Tumoni, heritage British era bungalows, Gandhi Asthidham, and Sudhakantha Sammanoi Khetra. Every year in March or April (Chot/Bohag), Ashokastami mela is held at Slighat's holy river bank. The Assam Cooperative Jute Mill Ltd. operates in Silghat.

== Economy ==
Assam Co-operative Jute Mills Ltd. operates at Silghat. The mill opened in 1970. It is a major producer of jute in Assam. It is the only jute mill in the country in the co-operative Sector. It was registered in 1959 under the Assam Co-operative Societies Act.

== Transport ==
The nearest airport is at Saloni, 10 km from Tezpur.

Silghat Town Railway Station provides train service. Alipurduar–Silghat Town Rajya Rani Express, Nagaon Express, Kolkata–Silghat Town Kaziranga Express, and Guwahati - Silghat Town DEMU originate from this station.

National Highway 52 passes through the town.

Silghat multimodal waterways terminal on Brahmaputra National Waterway 2 in Sissiborgaon tehsil is part of Bharatmala and Sagarmala projects. 19 National Waterways for the Northeast connectivity.

== Places of Interest ==
- Silghat Kamakhya Mandir
- Trishuldhari Shiva Mandir
