= Dahej–Ghogha Sea Connect =

Ferry service in India

- Locale: Gujarat
- Waterway: Gulf of Khambhat
- Transit type: RORO/ROPAX ferry
- Route: Ghogha ⇆ Hazira
- Operator: Indigo Seaways
- Began operation: 8 November 2020
- System length: 60 kilometres (37 mi)
- Travel time: 2-3 hrs
- No. of lines: 1
- No. of vessels: 2
- No. of terminals: 2
- Website: Official website

Dahej–Ghogha Sea Connect (DG Sea Connect) is a RORO/ROPAX ferry service connecting Ghogha and Hazira in Gulf of Khambhat in Gujarat, started in 2020.

== History ==
The project was started in 2012 by Narendra Modi, the then Chief Minister of Gujarat. The first phase between Ghogha and Dahej cost ₹6.15 billion (US$64 million) to the exchequer. It was envisioned to reduce the travel time between the two places from 6–8 hours by road to 1-1.5 hours by sea. The RORO services was launched by Indian Prime Minister Narendra Modi on 22 October 2017. The ROPAX passenger services were launched in August 2018 by the Chief Minister Vijay Rupani.

In its first one and a half year, the services were suspended six times due to various reasons. The services were again suspended from October 2019 to February 2020 due to siltation at Dahej. It was again suspended on 21 March 2020 due to dredging issue. Gujarat Maritime Board had spent ₹100 crore (US$10 million) to dredge a five-metre draft for the ferry in financial year 2018–19. Later it was announced that Dahej-Ghogha ferry was permanently suspended due to siltation and lack of financial feasibility in dredging. In March 2021, a ferry service carrying only passengers was restarted. The smaller ship has a capacity of 130 passengers and makes a single trip daily.

Later an alternative route to Hazira was considered for the services. In July 2020, Adani Hazira won the bid to lease their jetty. The ROPAX services between Ghogha and Hazira was inaugurated on 8 November 2020 by Prime Minister Modi.

== Operations ==
The ferry is operated by the Indigo Seaways Pvt. Ltd. in partnership with Gujarat Maritime Board.

One of the ferry is 2015 Korean-built Voyage Symphony model. It has a capacity of 525 passengers, 80 cars and 30 trucks. Between October 2017 and August 2019, about 3.31 lakh passengers and 7000 vehicles had used the service. In September 2022, another ferry Voyager Express was launched with a capacity of 600 passengers, 55 trucks, 25 tempos, 70 cars and 50 two-wheelers.

== See also ==
- RORO ferries in India
- Indian Rivers Inter-link
- List of national waterways in India
- Sagar Mala project, national water port development connectivity scheme
- Water transport in India
- Ghogha ROPAX Ferry Terminal
