= Bharatmala =

Indian highway and expressway construction project

- Type of project: Infrastructure
- Country: India
- Prime Minister(s): Narendra Modi
- Ministry: Ministry of Road Transport and Highways
- Key people: Nitin Gadkari
- Established: 31 July 2015; 11 years ago
- Status: Active

The Bharatmala Pariyojna (lit. 'India garland project') is a project in India implemented by Government of India. It is slated to interconnect 550 District Headquarters (from the current 300) through a minimum four-lane highway by raising the number of corridors to 50 (from the current six) and move 80% of freight traffic (40% currently) to national highways by interconnecting 24 logistics parks, 66 inter-corridors of total 8,000 km (5,000 mi), 116 feeder routes of total 7,500 km (4,700 mi) and seven northeast multi-modal waterway ports. The project also includes the development of tunnels, bridges, elevated corridors, flyovers, overpasses, interchanges, bypasses, and ring roads, to provide the shortest, jam-free and optimized connectivity to multiple places. It is a centrally-sponsored and funded road and highways project of the Government of India.

This ambitious umbrella programme subsumed all existing Highway Projects including the flagship National Highways Development Project (NHDP), launched by the Atal Bihari Vajpayee government in 1998. The total investment for 83,677 km (51,994 mi) committed new highways is estimated at ₹10.63 trillion (US$110 billion), making it the single largest outlay for a government road construction scheme (as of March 2022). The project will build highways from Maharashtra, Gujarat, Rajasthan, Punjab, Haryana and then cover the entire string of Himalayan territories - Jammu and Kashmir, Himachal Pradesh, Uttarakhand - and then portions of borders of Uttar Pradesh and Bihar alongside Terai, and move to West Bengal, Sikkim, Assam, Arunachal Pradesh, and right up to the Indo-Myanmar border in Manipur and Mizoram. Special emphasis will be given on providing connectivity to far-flung border and rural areas including the tribal and backward areas.

Other than NHDP related projects which are greenfield, there is Brownfield National Highway Projects which is an upgrade/widening of existing four-lane highways into six-lane highways that are not controlled access highways. Many state highways have been converted to National Highways under this project. It is both an enabler and beneficiary of other key Government of India schemes, such as industrial corridor, Make in India, Startup India, Standup India, Setu Bharatam, Sagarmala, dedicated freight corridors, UDAN-RCS, Digital India, BharatNet, and Parvatmala.

== Context ==
=== Size of Indian highway network ===
India's 6,617,100 km (4,111,675 mi) road network is the largest in the world, of which only 2% (~1,60,000 km) are national highways (NHs) carrying 40% road traffic.

=== Benefits of Bharatmala ===
Bharatmala will significantly boost highway infrastructure:

- Raise six NC corridors to 50 corridors (6 NC and 44 EC)
- Raise 40% freight to 80% freight on national highways
- Raise 300 districts to 550 districts connected by minimum four-lane highways

== Project components ==
=== Components summary ===
Bharatmala components or predecessors:

- Completed national road development connectivity older scheme
  - Golden Quadrilateral
- Subsumed in Bharatmala
  - National Highways Development Project
  - National corridors
    - Diamond Quadrilateral
    - North-South and East-West Corridor
  - Char Dham Highway
  - India-China Border Roads, partially subsumed in Bharatmala and partially under Ministry of Defence

=== National Highways Development Project ===
The NHDP project covers 48,793 km (30,319 mi), including 28,915 km (17,967 mi) completed, 10,574 km (6,570 mi) under construction and 9,304 km (5,781 mi) left for award (as of May 2017). The uncompleted projects under NHDP will also be subsumed in Bharatmala. NHDP was meant to convert dirt roads into national highways or any 1/2 lane roads into four-lane national highways.

==== National corridors ====
National Corridors of India (NC) are six high volume corridors, including four in Golden Quadrilateral and 2 in North–South and East–West Corridors, including Mumbai - Kolkata Highway (NH6), known as East Coast - West Coast Corridor, that carry 35% of India's freight. Expansion to six to eight lanes, ring roads, bypasses and elevated corridors will be built in Bharatmala to decongest the National Corridors. Logistics Parks will be set up along the NC. Busiest stretches of National Corridors will be converted to the expressways. 8,000 km (5,000 mi) inter-corridor and 7,500 km (4,700 mi) feeder routes will be built. Additionally, 3,300 km (2,100 mi) of border roads and 2,000 km (1,200 mi) international highways will be built to connect six national corridors to international trade routes.

==== National Corridors Efficiency Program ====
National Corridors Efficiency Program (NCEP) entails 5,000 km (3,100 mi) phase-I decongestion of 185 choke points by 34 6-8 laning, 45 bypasses and 30 ring roads of 6 NC.

New ring roads in Bharatmala include:

- Agra
- Amaravati
- Belgaum
- Bengaluru
- Berhampur
- Bhubaneswar
- Chitradurga
- Delhi
- Dhanbad
- Dhule
- Gurugram
- Indore
- Jabalpur
- Jaipur
- Kota
- Lucknow
- Madurai
- Nagpur
- Patna
- Pune
- Raipur
- Ranchi
- Sagar
- Sambalpur
- Shivpuri
- Solapur
- Surat
- Thiruvananthapuram
- Udaipur
- Varanasi
- Vijayawada

==== Northeast India connectivity ====
North East Economic corridor will connect seven state capitals and seven multimodal waterways terminals on Brahmaputra on the Bharatmala route.

- Dhubri
- Silghat
- Biswanath Ghat
- Neamati
- Dibrugarh
- Sengajan
- Oriyamghat

=== Economic corridors ===
44 economic corridors or industrial corridors of India, 26,200 km (16,300 mi), were identified and 9,000 km (5,600 mi) will be taken up in phase-I. They exclude six national corridors. 66 8,000 km (5,000 mi) inter-corridors (IC) & 116 7,500 km (4,700 mi) feeder routes (FR) were identified for Bharatmala.

==== List of national economic corridors ====
List of 44 economic corridors (EC):

- EC-1: Mumbai-Kolkata
- EC-2: Mumbai-Kanyakumari
- EC-3: Amritsar-Jamnagar
- EC-4: Kandla-Sagar
- EC-5: Agra-Mumbai
- EC-6: Pune-Vijayawada
- EC-7: Raipur-Dhanbad
- EC-8: Ludhiana-Ajmer
- EC-9: Surat-Nagpur
- EC-10: Hyderabad-Panaji
- EC-11: Jaipur-Indore
- EC-12: Solapur-Nagpur
- EC-13: Sagar-Varanasi
- EC-14: Kharagpur-Siliguri
- EC-15: Raipur-Visakhapatnam
- EC-16: Delhi-Lucknow
- EC-17: Chennai-Kurnool
- EC-18: Indore-Nagpur
- EC-19: Chennai-Madurai
- EC-20: Mangaluru-Raichur
- EC-21: Tuticorin-Cochin
- EC-22: Solapur-Bellary-Gooty
- EC-23: Hyderabad-Aurangabad
- EC-24: Delhi-Kanpur
- EC-25: Tharad-Phalodi
- EC-26: Nagaur-Mandi Dabwali
- EC-27: Sagar-Lucknow
- EC-28: Sambalpur-Paradeep
- EC-29: Amreli-Vadodra
- EC-30: Godhra-Khargone
- EC-31: Sambalpur-Ranchi
- EC-32: Bengaluru-Malappuram
- EC-33: Raisen-Pathariya
- EC-34: Bengaluru-Mangaluru
- EC-35: Chittaurgarh-Indore
- EC-36: Bilaspur-New Delhi
- EC-37: Solapur-Mahabubnagar
- EC-38: Bengaluru-Nellore
- EC-39: Ajmer-Udaipur
- EC-40: Sirsa-Delhi
- EC-41: Sirohi-Beawar
- EC-42: Jaipur-Agra
- EC-43: Pune-Aurangabad
- EC-44: North East Corridor

==== Logistics parks ====
Logistics parks entailing 45% of India's freight traffic have been identified to be connected by Bharatmala economic corridors, to develop hub-and-spoke model where hub-to-hub transport can be done with 30 tonne trucks and hub-to-spoke transport can be done with 10 tonne trucks. Currently all transport is point-to-point in 10 tonne trucks (2017).

- Ambala
- Bengaluru
- Bathinda
- Bhopal
- Chennai
- Cochin
- Coimbatore
- Guwahati
- Hisar
- Hyderabad
- Indore
- Jagatsinghpur
- Jaipur
- Jammu
- Kandla
- Kolkata
- Kota
- Nagpur
- Nashik
- Panaji
- Patna
- Pune
- Raipur
- Rajkot
- Solan
- Sundargarh
- Valsad
- Vijayawada
- Visakhapatnam
- North Gujarat
  - Ahmedabad
  - Vadodara
- South Gujarat
  - Surat
  - Bharuch
- North Punjab
  - Jalandhar
  - Amritsar
  - Gurdaspur
  - Mukerian
- South Punjab
  - Ludhiana
  - Sangrur
  - Patiala
- Delhi-NCR
  - Delhi
  - Faridabad
    (IMT Manesar)
  - Narnaul
    (Nangal Choudhary IMHL)
  - Ghaziabad
- MMR
  - Mumbai
  - Mumbai suburbs
  - Jnpt
  - Mumbai Port
  - Thane
  - Raigad

==== International economic corridors ====
===== India's neighbourhood =====
- East of India: India's Act East policy connectivity will be further developed in the Bharatmala routes (slide 22) with several dozen 24 Integrated check posts (ICPs), transit through Bangladesh to improve Northeast India, and integrating Bangladesh–Bhutan–Nepal-Myanmar–Thailand BIMSTEC corridors.
  - Bangladesh-China-India-Myanmar (BCIM Economic Corridor)
  - Mekong-Ganga Cooperation
  - BIMSTEC projects, Bay of Bengal informal Economic Corridor
    - Bangladesh Bhutan India Nepal Initiative (BBIN)
    - India-Myanmar Kaladan Multi-Modal Transit Transport Project
    - India–Myanmar–Thailand Trilateral Highway
    - Great Nicobar Island Development Project, including International Container Transshipment Port, Galathea Bay
    - Thai Canal
    - Sabang strategic port development, India-Indonesia project
    - Dawei Port Project in Myanmar
- West of India
  - India–Middle East–Europe Economic Corridor (IMAC)

===== Asia-wide =====
- Asian Highway Network
- ASEAN–India Free Trade Area
- Trans-Asian Railway
- Hippie trail, defunct road route from UK to India-Singapore-Australia

===== Global =====
- Build Back Better World, G7 rival to China's "One Belt, One Road"
- Free and Open Indo-Pacific
- With Russia
  - East of India: Chennai–Vladivostok Maritime Corridor
  - West of India: International North–South Transport Corridor, included Chabahar Port

== Finance ==
=== Central Road Fund ===
Central Road Fund (CRF) was created as a non-lapsable fund under the Central Road Fund Act 2000, by imposing a cess on petrol and diesel, to build and upgrade national highways, state roads, rural roads, railway under/over bridges, and national waterways.

=== Bharatmala Phase-I funds ===
Total phase-I budget ₹692,324 crore (US$72 billion) for five years Bharatmala project from 2017 to 2022, including existing NH projects subsumed under Bharatmala, such as incomplete National Highways, SARDP-NE, Externally Aided Projects (EAP, e.g. world Bank and ADB), and Left Wing Extremism roads (LWE).

== Implementation phases ==
=== NHIDCL ===
The National Highways and Infrastructure Development Corporation Limited was created in 2014 as a fully owned company of the Ministry of Road Transport and Highways by the Government of India to expedite construction of National Highway projects with specific focus on Northeast India.

=== Phases ===
The plan envisages the construction of 83,677 km (51,994 mi) roads, including 34,800 km (21,600 mi) of additional highways and roads across the country, apart from an existing plan of building 48,877 km (30,371 mi) of new highways by the National Highway Authority of India. Bharatmala has synergy with Sagarmala.

==== Phase 1: 34,800 km ====
Bharatmala phase-I will raise the NH connection to a total of 80% or 550 districts out of a total of 718 districts from the current 42% or 300 districts connected to NH (as of Dec. 2017). Mapping of Shortest Route for 12,000 routes carrying 90% of India's freight, commodity-wise survey of freight movement across 600 districts, automated traffic surveys over 1,500+ points across the country, and satellite mapping of corridors was done to identify upgradation requirements for Bharatmala.

The total length of 34,800 km (21,600 mi) highways will be constructed under phase-I, including 24,800 km (15,400 mi) of new highways and another 10,000 km (6,200 mi) currently under-construction remaining incomplete under NHDP, compared to the 19 years it took to upgrade almost same length of national highways under NHDP.

Road type	Total length	Phase-I length	Notes
Economic corridors	26,200 km (16,300 mi)	9,000 km (5,600 mi)	44 EC corridors exclude 6 NC.
Inter-corridor & feeder routes	15,500 km (9,600 mi)	6,000 km (3,700 mi)	66 8,000 km (5,000 mi) inter-corridors (IC) & 116 7,500 km (4,700 mi) feeder routes (FR).
National Corridors Efficiency Program		5,000 km (3,100 mi)	6-8 laning, bypasses and ring roads of 6 NC.
Border & international connectivity roads	5,300 km (3,300 mi)	2,000 km (1,200 mi)	3,300 km (2,100 mi) of border roads and 2,000 km (1,200 mi) to connect 6 national corridors to international trade routes, such as BIMSTEC, MIT and BIN (Bangladesh-India-Nepal).
Coastal & port connectivity roads		2,000 km (1,200 mi)	Synergy with Sagarmala.
Expressways	1,600 km (990 mi)	800 km (500 mi)	NC stretches converted to expressway.
Total under Bharatmala Pariyojana		24,800 km (15,400 mi)	
NH remaining under NHDP	10,000 km (6,200 mi)	10,000 km (6,200 mi)	
Total to be built or upgraded	83,677 km (51,994 mi)	34,800 km (21,600 mi)	

==== Phase-II: 48,877 km ====
Multimodal logistics parks will make current corridors more effective, and will improve connectivity with north east and leverage synergy with inland waterways.

Multi-modal logistics parks will provide seamless cargo transfer between railway cargo, inland waterways, air cargo, dedicated freight corridors, access-controlled expressways, national highways, and state highways in a hub and spoke model.

== See also ==
- Targeted projects
  - Golden Quadrilateral, India's project to connect major cities of India forming a quadrilateral
  - India-China Border Roads, strategic border roads mostly under Ministry of Defence
  - Parvatmala, India's project for nation-wide cable car transportation
  - Setu Bharatam, India's project to make all national highways railway crossings free
  - Sagar Mala, India's project to modernise and connect all shipping ports
  - UDAN, India's project for regional civil aviation connectivity
- Transport in India
  - Future of rail transport in India
  - Expressways of India
  - List of national highways in India
  - Indian Human Spaceflight Programme
- Other
  - Indian Rivers Inter-link
  - List of national waterways in India
  - List of longest ring roads
