= BECL =

BECL may refer to:

- Bangkok Expressway Company Limited
- Bhavnagar Energy Company Limited, which owns the Bhavnagar Thermal Power Station
