= Bhumbhali =

Bhumbhali is a village in Bhavnagar Taluka of Bhavnagar district in Gujarat, India.

Bhumbhali is famous for a kind of yellow earth, which is used as a flux for soldering metal vessels. This is largely exported. About a mile from Bhumbhali, on the road to Koliak, is the Bhamaria well, said to have been constructed by Mokhadaji Gohil, to enable him to water his camels when raiding near Ghogha.

== Demography ==
It had a population of 1563 in 1881.
