= PLIC (disambiguation) =

PLIC may refer to:

- Premier League International Cup
- Platform-Level Interrupt Controller, a programmable interrupt controller for RISC-V architecture
- Port-Linked Industrial Clusters; see Sagar Mala project § List of Port-Linked Industrial Clusters (PLIC)
