= Kolkata–Silghat Town Kaziranga Express =

Express train in India

Overview
- Service type: Express
- Locale: West Bengal, Assam
- First service: 1 January 2019; 7 years ago
- Current operator: Eastern Railway zone

Route
- Termini: Kolkata (KOAA); Silghat Town (SHTT)
- Stops: 15
- Distance travelled: 1,175 km (730 mi)
- Average journey time: 23h 55m
- Service frequency: Weekly
- Train number: 13181/13182

On-board services
- Classes: AC 2 tier, AC 3 tier, Sleeper class, General Unreserved
- Seating arrangements: No
- Sleeping arrangements: Yes
- Catering facilities: On-board catering E-catering
- Observation facilities: LHB coach
- Entertainment facilities: No
- Baggage facilities: No
- Other facilities: Below the seats

Technical
- Rolling stock: 4
- Track gauge: 1,676 mm (5 ft 6 in)
- Operating speed: 49 km/h (30 mph), including halts

Kaziranga Express is an Express train belonging to Eastern Railway zone that runs between Kolkata and Silghat Town in India via Rampurhat, Malda Town, New Jalpaiguri. It is currently being operated with 13181/13182 train numbers on a weekly basis.

The train is named after Kaziranga National Park of Assam, which is famous for the great one-horned rhinoceroses.

== Route ==
- Kolkata
- Barddhaman Junction
- Bolpur Shantiniketan
- Rampurhat Junction
- Malda Town
- New Jalpaiguri (Siliguri)
- New Cooch Behar
- New Alipurduar
- Fakiragram
- New Bongaigaon
- Kamakhya
- Guwahati
- Jagiroad
- Chaparmukh
- Nagaon
- Jaklabandha
- Silghat Town

Note: Bold letters indicates Major Railway Stations/Major Cities.

== Locomotive ==
earlier was WDM-3D. It is hauled by an Electric Loco Shed, Howrah-based WAP-7 from Kolkata to New Cooch Behar and then a Diesel Loco Shed, Siliguri-based WDP-4D locomotive completes the journey from New Cooch Behar to Silghat Town for 13181 and vice versa for 13182.

== Service ==
The 13181/Kolkata–Silghat Town Kaziranga Express has an average speed of 52 km/h and covers 1175 km in 22h 40m. The 13182/Silghat Town–Kolkata Kaziranga Express has an average speed of 53 km/h and covers 1175 km in 22h 05m.

== Rake sharing ==
The train shares its rake with 13167/13168 Kolkata–Agra Cantonment Express.

== See also ==
Kolkata–Sairang Express
