= Ghogha ROPAX Ferry Terminal =

ROPAX terminal in India

- Interactive map of the Ghogha ROPAX Ferry Terminal area
- Alternative names: Ghogha Ferry Terminal

General information
- Type: Ferry building
- Location: Machhiwada, Ghogha, Gujarat-364110, India
- Coordinates: 21.677171°N 72.282922°E
- Current tenants: Dahej–Ghogha Sea Connect
- Construction started: 2019
- Completed: 2020
- Owner: Gujarat Maritime Board, Government of Gujarat

Ghogha ROPAX Ferry Terminal is a combined RoRo-Passenger ferry terminal, located in Ghogha, Bhavnagar district, Gujarat.

== History ==
The concept of a ferry terminal was formulated in 1979 under the 5th Five-Year Plans of India to establish a modern ferry service for the transportation of loaded trucks, buses, and other vehicles across the Gulf of Khambhat between Ghogha and Dahej. Later, it was passed on as a component of a state government initiative.

The terminal was inaugurated in 2020 by Indian Prime Minister Narendra Modi as a part of the Ghogha-Hazira ferry service.
