= Piram Island =

- island
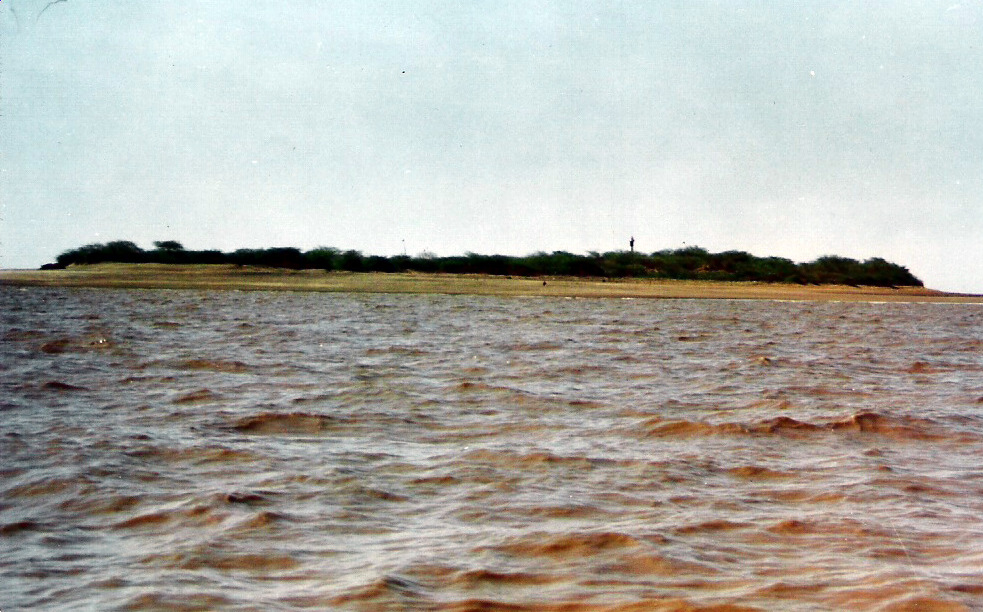
- Piram island from the sea

- Location in Gujarat, India Piram Island (India)
- Coordinates: 21°35.9′N 72°21.2′E
- Country: India
- State: Gujarat
- District: Bhavnagar district

Area
  - Total: 0.753 km^{2} (0.291 sq mi)

Languages
  - Official: Gujarati, Hindi
- Time zone: UTC+5:30 (IST)

Piram Island or Piram Bet is an island in Gulf of Cambay of Arabian Sea which falls under Bhavnagar district of Gujarat state, India. Except the campus of lighthouse, the island is privately owned.

== Geography ==
The island is situated 7.2 nautical miles from Ghogha, a town and former sea port, in Bhavnagar district. The island is spread of 186 acres but half of it is wasteland.

== History ==
The island is connected with Ghogha throughout its history. The island was under Muslim soldiers of Delhi Sultanate in early years of 14th century. In 1325, the island was captured by Mokhadaji Gohil, the Gohil chief of Umrala and ancestor of Bhavnagar State family. He made the island his headquarter, built a fort and levied toll from all ships passing up the Gulf of Cambay. He became a noted pirate in Gulf. His exactions came to the knowledge of the emperor Muhammad bin Tughluq of Delhi Sultanate who was then quelling a revolt in Gujarat. In 1347, Tughluq attacked Ghogha and killed Mokhadaji. He destroyed the fort of Piram island. He left Ghogha and Piram in the hands of Dungarji, Mokhadaji's son.

The island fell into obscurity after the destruction of the fort. In the middle of the eighteenth century (c. 1729), a merchant of Surat named Mulla Muhammad Ali, built a fort on Piram with an intention to establish himself as an independent chief. Subsequently it fell under the royal family of Bhavnagar State who had built a bastion on south west corner of the island to keep watch on the maritime activities. The British built the 24m high circular masonry lighthouse tower on the bastion in 1864-65 from the ruins of Mulla's bastion. The lighthouse and quarters are now owned by Directorate General of Lighthouse and Lightships, Government of India which was the only settlement on the island which was closed down in 2010. The island is under ownership of decedent of royals of Bhavnagar, Siddhrajsinh Raol. It is one of the few privately owned virgin islands of India. He intended to sell it in 2012.

== Paleontology and Archaeology ==
The island exposes sediments of Late Miocene age, equivalent to the Siwalik Hills. fossils found include the sivatheriine giraffes, Bramatherium and Sivatherium were found. The fossils of the prehistoric equid, Hipparion were also found on the island. Also known is Piramys a side-necked turtle belonging to the family Podocnemididae, a group which no longer occurs in India or Asia and today is only found in South America and Madagascar. Several shipwrecks found around the island are dated to the fourteenth century.

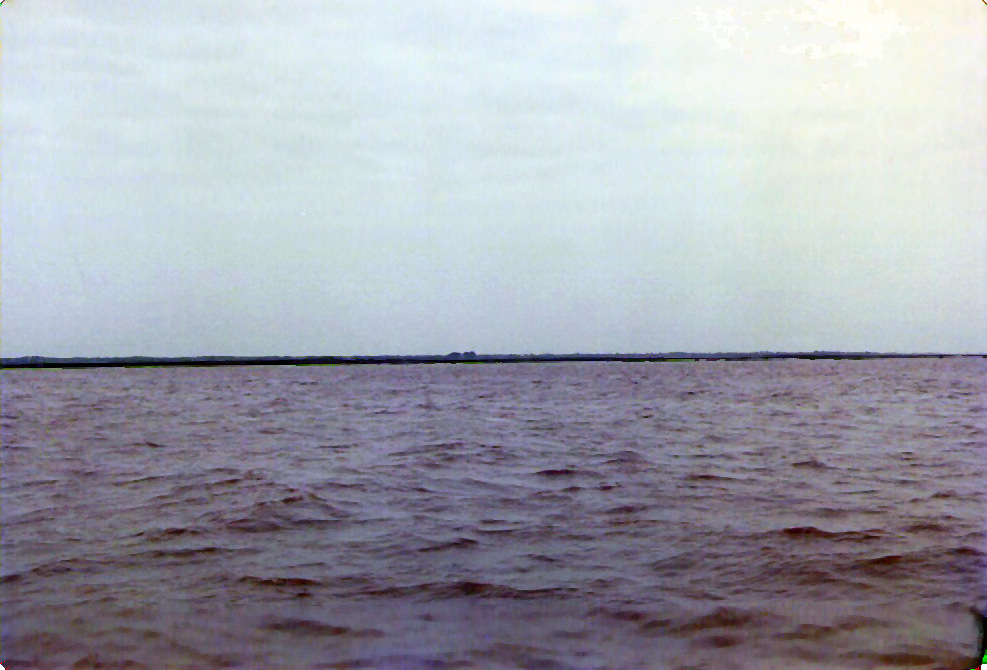
Piram Bet

== Flora and fauna ==
The island has mangrove vegetation and also nesting site for two endangered species of sea turtle; Olive ridley sea turtle and Green sea turtle, and around fifty species of birds, mostly seabirds. The sea turtles arrives for nesting in August–September.
