= Bhavnagar Thermal Power Station =

- Country: India
- Location: Ghogha
- Coordinates: 21°34′56″N 72°13′22″E
- Status: Operational
- Commission date: 2017
- Operator: Bhavnagar Energy Company Limited

Thermal power station
- Primary fuel: Coal

Power generation
- Units operational: 2 X 250 MW
- Nameplate capacity: 500 MW

External links
- Website: www.becl.in

Bhavnagar Thermal Power Station or Padva Thermal Power Station is a coal-based thermal power plant located in Padva village near Ghogha town in Bhavnagar district, Gujarat. The power plant is owned by Bhavnagar Energy Company Limited. Bharat Heavy Electricals is executing the project.

== Capacity ==
The planned capacity of the power plant in 500 MW.

Stage	Unit Number	Capacity (MW)	Date of Commissioning
1st	1	250	Commissioned 2016 May
1st	2	250	Commissioned 2017 March
