= Dhubri Port =

River port in Assam

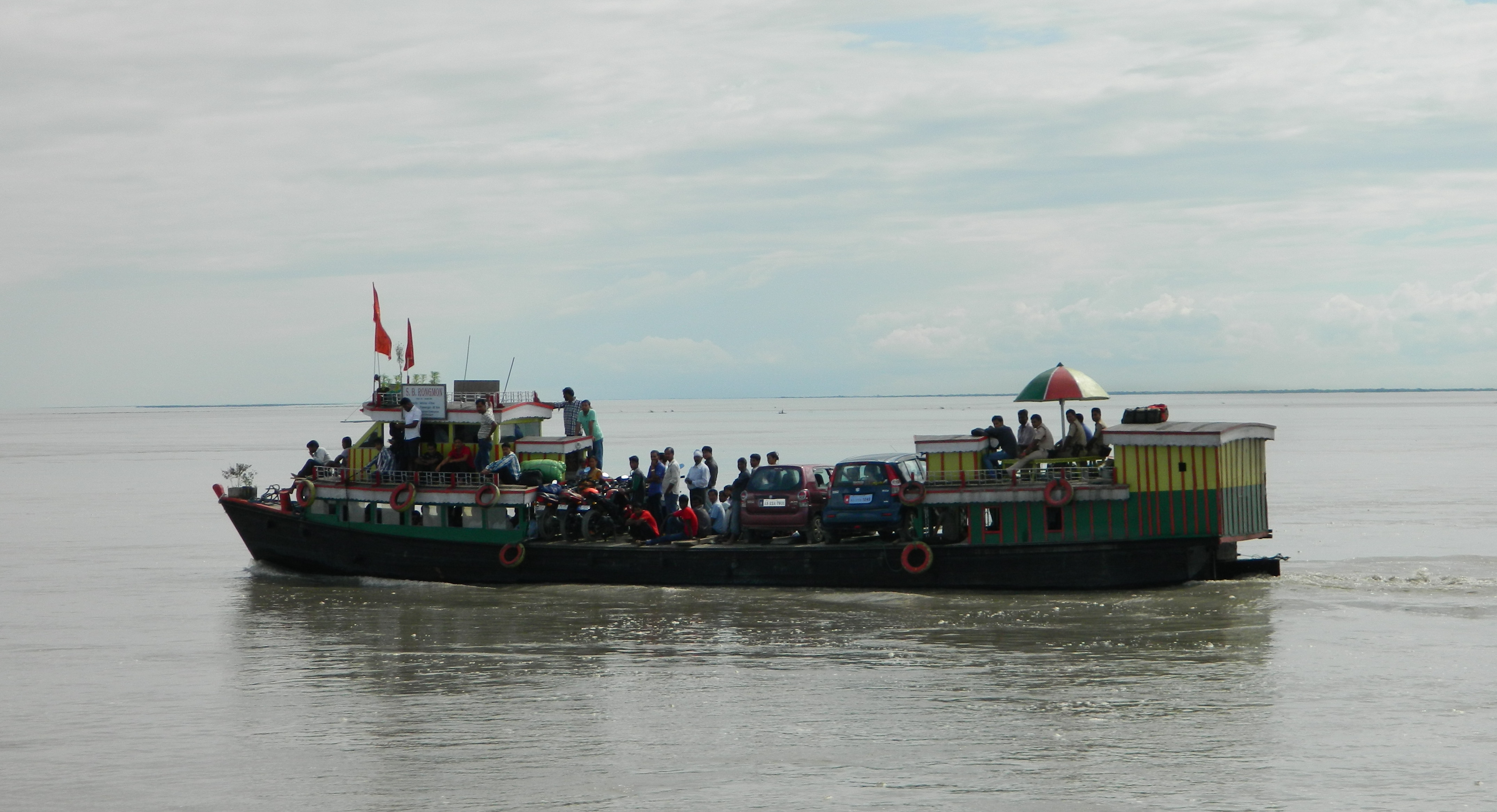
- Click on the map for a fullscreen view
- Dhubri Port (India)

Location
- Country: India
- Location: Dhubri, Assam
- Coordinates: 26°00′40″N 89°59′06″E

Details
- Operated by: Inland Waterways Authority of India
- Owned by: Inland Waterways Authority of India
- Type of harbour: River port
- No. of wharfs: 1
- Draft depth: 2 metres (6 ft 7 in)
- Cargo: Coal, Jute, Stone, Fertilizer

Statistics
- Website https://www.dhubriport.com

Dhubri port is an important river port in Assam, India. This port is located in Dhubri town on the banks of the Brahmaputra River. This port is located on the National Waterway 2. It is important for port terminal. It is located near the Bangladesh border at the western end of National Waterway 2.

== Location ==
Dhubri Port or Jetty is located in Dhubri town on the north bank of the Brahmaputra River.

== History ==
Dhubri port is a very old river port. This port is an important part of the economy of Dhubri and its adjoining areas. From the time of the British rule, this port was connected to the port of Kolkata with the water route. Jute and rice from Dumbari port were sent to the Port of Kolkata. After the country's independence, the Jamuna and Sundarban rivers fall between Pakistan and later Bangladesh. However, now between the two countries, ships and small vessels are carrying goods between Kolkata and Dhubri port.

== RORO ==
Port has a roll-on/roll-off (RORO) ferry service with 1 low draft vessel operated on National Waterway 2 (NW2) by Inland Waterways Authority of India (IWAR) with capacity of 200 passenger, 4 cars and 2 trucks.

== See also ==
- Inland waterways of India
- Pandu Port
