= National Waterway 2 =

Indian waterway

National Waterways (NW-2)

Details
- Location: India
- Opened: 1 September, 1988
- Length: 891 km
- North end: Sadiya
- South end: Bangladesh border
- No. of terminals: 11
- Owner: Inland Waterways Authority of India (IWAI)
- Operator: Central Inland Water Transport Corporation (CIWTC)

National Waterway 2 (NW-2) is a section of the Brahmaputra River having a length of 891 km between the Bangladesh border near Dhubri and Sadiya in Assam.

== History ==
It was declared as National Waterway No. 2 on 1 September 1988.

== Development ==
=== Summary ===
- Established: September 1988.
- Length: 891 km
- Fixed terminals: Pandu Port.
- Floating terminals: Dhubri Port, Jogighopa, Tezpur, Silghat, Dibrugarh, Jamuguri, Bogibil, Saikhowa and Sadiya

=== Navigational aid ===
To provide the safe navigation for various vessels, day navigation marks with bamboos and navigational lights fixed on country boats/beacons have been provided between the Bangladesh Border and Dibrugarh.

=== Enhancements ===
In December 2017, the union minister Nitin Gadkari flagged off 2 barges of 200-tonne capacity each carrying a total of 400 tonnes of cement from the Pandu Port to Dhubri Port for a distance of 255 km, resulting in reduction of 300 km of road travel and logistics costs for this Sagarmala project to connect Northeast India and to enhance movement for the Indian Armed Forces by setting up roll on-roll off services, 4 Global Positioning System (DGPS) stations for safe navigation (Dhubri, Jogighopa, Biswanthghat and Dibrugarh) and 12 floating terminal facilities (Hatsingimari, Dhubri, Jogighopa, Pandu Port, Tezpur, Silghat, Biswanath Ghat, Neamati, Sengajan, Bogibil, Dibrugarh/Oakland and Uriumghat, which will be increased). There are 19 National Waterways for the Northeast connectivity.

=== Economic impact ===
India and Bangladesh plan to use NW2 as part of the larger Eastern Waterways Grid for economic development purposes.

=== See also ===
- Inland waterways of India
- Inland Waterways Authority of India
- Pandu Port

=== External links ===
- NW II on the website of the Inland Waterways Authority of India
