= Pandu Port =

- Interactive map of Pandu Port
- Location within India

Location
- Country: India
- Location: Guwahati, Assam
- Coordinates: 26°10′15″N 91°40′42″E

Details
- Operated by: Inland Waterways Authority of India
- Owned by: Inland Waterways Authority of India
- Type of Harbor: River port
- No. of wharfs: 2
- Products Products: coal, jute, stone, chemical fertilizer

Statistics
- Depth of the port: 2 metres (6 ft 7 in)
- Website www.panduport.com

Pandu Port is a river port in the Indian state of Assam, serving Guwahati. This port has been developed on the bank of the Brahmaputra river. The port is the most important and the largest river port in Assam state. Many passenger ships at the port are anchored with the tourists. However, the state government has now allocated funds for the modernization of the port for national waterway development projects. In order to arrange a ship anchorage, a naval terminal or permanent jetty has been formed. The Port is included in the port of call agreement between India and Bangladesh.

== History ==
The port has been working as the main river port of the Brahmaputra valley for a long time centering Guwahati city. In the British India era, jute and tea were transported from the port to Kolkata Port and Chittagong port. The necessary goods were imported by the port on the same track. But after independence, this path was started till 1956. After that it was closed.

== Importance ==
Pandu port acts as a natural river harbour. It falls under Dhubri-Sadiya National Waterway-2 and is an important terminal cum transit point for goods and cargo as well as passenger and tourist vessels. Construction of both low-level and high-level jetty of fixed terminal, capable of handling container vessels, has been completed and has further enhanced revenue generation for the city. The port opened a new route for transporting goods in Assam and North East India. Assam and Northeast India associated with Kolkata Port and Haldia Port by Pandu port.

== Infrastructure ==
A low level jetty is operational for berthing of vessels. Two shore cranes of 20 ton capacity, one container crane of 75 ton capacity and ones floating crane are placed at terminal for handling of cargo. A high level jetty and B.G. siding is under construction at this location.

- A permanent terminal for container transport.
- The high and low level jetty of the river for shipping the goods.

== RORO ==
Port has a roll-on/roll-off (RORO) ferry service with 1 vessel operated on National Waterway 2 (NW2) by Inland Waterways Authority of India (IWAR) with capacity of 200 passenger, 4 cars and 2 trucks.
