= Multi-Modal Logistics Parks in India =

Policy initiative

Multi-Modal Logistics Parks (MMLPs) is a key policy initiative of the Government of India, led by National Highways Logistics Management Limited under Ministry of Road Transport and Highways (MoRTH) and the National Highways Authority of India (NHAI), to develop Multi-Modal Logistics Parks in hub-and-spoke model to improve the country's freight logistics sector by lowering overall freight costs and time, cutting warehousing costs, reducing vehicular pollution and congestion, improving the tracking and traceability of consignments through infrastructural, procedural, and information technology interventions.

Since, in 2017, India had comparatively high logistics costs, 13% of total price of goods compared with 8% in other major economies and average 72% higher cost than China of exporting/importing a container in India. To make India globally competitive by reducing these costs and time, the MoRTH is developing multi-modal logistics parks at selected locations in the country under its Logistics Efficiency Enhancement Program (LEEP).

MMLP is officially defined as a freight-handling facility with a minimum area of 100 acres (40.5 hectares), with various modes of transport access, mechanized warehouses, specialized storage solutions such as cold storage, facilities for mechanized material handling and inter-modal transfer container terminals, and bulk and break-bulk cargo terminals. Logistics parks will also provide value-added services such as customs clearance with bonded storage yards, quarantine zones, testing facilities, and warehousing management services. Provisions will also be made for late-stage manufacturing activities such as kitting and final assembly, grading, sorting, labelling and packaging activities, re-working, and returns management.

As of July 2021, 35 MMLPs has been identified by MoRTH. Among those Bangalore, Chennai, Guwahati and Nagpur are under implementation, and the rest are in pre-planning and DPR is yet to be prepared.

== Background ==
=== Expansion of logistics sector with India's economic growth ===
Keeping pace with India's rapid economic growth is the expansion of the country's logistics sector. The movement of freight in the country nearly doubled to around 2,300 billion ton-kilometers in fiscal year 2015 from 1,200 billion ton-kilometres in the fiscal year 2008. The government expects freight movement in the country to continue its growth trajectory, with expected annual growth of 8%–10% over the next 10 years. The logistics sector as a whole, according to a study commissioned by MoRTH, is poised to expand at roughly 1.2 times the rate of India's gross domestic product growth through 2032, by which time it is expected to generate $360 billion in value-added, up from $115 billion in 2017.

=== India's Logistics Performance Index score ===
In 2016, India managed to improve its performance in the Logistics Performance Index (LPI), a ranking published by the World Bank to measure the logistics performance of countries. India's LPI ranking rose to 38th in 2023, up from 54th in 2014. India witnessed a “spectacular rise” of 16 places in the Logistics Performance Index (LPI). India's ranking, however, still lags behind some of its economic peers, including other Asian countries. The best logistics performer in Asia is Singapore, which was ranked 5th in 2016, followed by Hong Kong, China (9th); Japan (12th); the Republic of Korea (24th); and the People's Republic of China (PRC) (27th). Among the grouping of so-called BRICS—comprising Brazil, Russia, India, the PRC, and South Africa—aside from the PRC, South Africa also outperformed India in 2016 with a ranking of 20th (World Bank, 2016).

India's National Logistics EMarket Place will empower India as a major logistics hub in the coming decade.

== Government's MMLP initiative ==
=== Drivers and challenges for logistics sector development in India ===
Logistics costs are high in India relative to costs in developed countries, which were 13% of GDP in 2015 compared to approximately 8%–10% in developed nations. India's road freight cost per ton-kilometer, adjusted for purchasing power parity, is ₹1.90 ($0.03), which is almost double that of the United States. These higher logistics costs in India are primarily driven by the following five key factors.

1. Unfavorable inter-modal mix: 60% of freight movement skewed toward road transport despite the lower freight cost of rail transport.
2. Inefficient fleet mix: Characterized by smaller, inefficient trucks.
3. Underdeveloped material handling infrastructure: A fragmented industry consisting largely of small, unorganized warehouses with limited mechanization.
4. Underdeveloped road infrastructure: Limited presence of 4 and 6 lane national highways.
5. Institutional and regulatory bottlenecks: Such as complicated documentation and procedures related to toll collections, adversely impact logistics costs in India.

=== Government's policy and reforms initiatives ===
To overcome the challenges to the development of the logistics sector, the government took several initiatives. In addition to the nationwide imposition of a goods and services tax (GST), Make in India, and infrastructure improvement projects, the Government of India is undertaking reforms and technology adoption to transform India's integrated logistics sector which includes the following:

- Logistics division in the Ministry of Commerce and Industry:
  It was newly established to coordinate integrated development of the sector via policy changes, improvement in existing procedures, identification of bottlenecks and gaps, and introduction of technology-based interventions.
- Integrated logistics portal:
  To connect buyers, logistics service providers and relevant government agencies.
- Improved access to credit:
  Reclassification of the logistics sector as a subsector of the Infrastructure sector, which now provides the logistics sector access to long-term credit.
- Simplification of processes:
  The approval process for the construction of MMLPs is simplified, and investments by debt and pension funds into recognized logistics projects would be encouraged by the regulated sector's market accountability.

=== Five key functions of MMLP ===

The development of MMLPs is envisaged as a key policy measure to reduce logistics costs and help address three of the five constraining issues identified above. Specifically, these include an unfavorable modal mix, inefficient fleet mix, and underdeveloped material handling infrastructure. In July 2017, the Government of India approved a plan to build 35 MMLPs. State governments will provide the land needed for the projects, which will then be taken up through public–private partnerships.

MMLPs have 5 key functions:

- freight aggregation and distribution,
- multi-modal freight transport,
- integrated storage and warehousing,
- information technology support, and
- value-added services.

== List of MMLPs by states ==
In 2017, the Government of India launched a program to develop 35 multi-modal logistics parks across the country over the succeeding years and invited Asian Development Bank (ADB) to become a lead partner and provide the necessary support (Jeong, 2017). ADB then conducted a pre-feasibility study to assess the suitability of MMLP locations and identify the requisite infrastructure, connectivity, and regulatory reforms in two selected locations: Bengaluru in Karnataka and Guwahati in Assam.

MoRTH has planned to develop 35 MMLPs under Public-Private Partnership (PPP) in Design, Build, Finance, Operate and Transfer (DBFOT) mode. Based on the detailed project report (DPR), feasibility study and approved bidding document, the tender will be invited from companies. The bidding documents (The Model Concession Agreement and Request for Proposal) is being finalised for these 35 MMLPs, following cities have been selected. Each will have a minimum area of 100 acres (40.5 hectares). The following MMLP have been identified:

- Andhra Pradsh
  - Vijayawada
  - Visakhapatnam
- Assam
  - Guwahati, under construction by the National Highways and Infrastructure Development Corporation (NHIDCL) on 190 acres. MMLP at Jogighopa incorporates rail, road, and inland-waterway connectivity, and the proposed site is located along National Waterway 2 and on the Indo-Bangladesh road route, making it suitable for the MMLP with multi modal access.
- Bihar
  - Patna
- Chhattisgarh
  - Raipur
- Delhi-NCR
- Gujarat
  - Kandla
  - Rajkot
  - Port of Pipavav, APM Terminals Pipavav in partnership with Contrans Logistic, has opened a state-of-the-art multimodal logistics park (MMLP Pipavav) Phase-1 near the port of Piapvav. offering connectivity with international and coastal shipping routes, access to the Indian rail network through the Dedicated Freight Corridor and connects to the evolving road network in Gujarat and the northern hinterland.
  - Surat
  - Valsad

- Haryana
  - Ambala
  - Hisar MMLP
- Himachal Pradesh
  - Solan
- Jammu and Kashmir
  - Jammu
- Karnataka
  - Bangalore, 1600 acres land identified in Mudalinganahalli and Hulikunte is waiting initiation of land acquisition process. In this regard, the state government identified Dabaspete as the site for the park for Bengaluru in Karnataka.
- Kerala
  - Kochi
- Punjab
  - Bhatinda
  - Sangrur
- Madhya Pradesh
  - Indore
  - Bhopal
- Maharashtra
  - Jalna Dry Port
  - Mumbai dighi port raigad
  - Nagpur, 346 acres land of Jawaharlal Nehru Port Trust (JNPT) identified.
  - Nashik, Panaji
  - Pune
  - Sangli, Salgare
- Odisha
  - Sundergarh
- Rajasthan
  - Jaipur
  - Kota
- Tamil Nadu
  - Chennai, 122 acres out of 158 acres is owned by Chennai Port Trust (ChPT).
  - Coimbatore
- Telangana
  - Hyderabad
- West Bengal
  - Kolkata

== See also ==
- Logistics Performance Index
- Ministry of Road Transport and Highways
- National Highways Authority of India
- Make in India
- Dedicated freight corridors in India
