= List of national waterways in India =

There are 111 officially notified Inland National Waterways (NWs) in India identified for the purposes of inland water transport, as per The National Waterways Act, 2016. Out of the 111 NWs, 106 were created in 2016. The NW network covers around 20,275.5 km. NW-1, 2, & 3 are already operational. Cargo as well as passenger / cruise vessels are plying on these waterways. Detailed Project Report (DPR) for development of NW-4 & 5 was completed in 2010. The DPR of NW 5 was updated in 2014. For the newly declared 106 NWs, techno-economic feasibility studies have been initiated.

National waterways in India handled 55 million tonne (MT) in 2017-18 and 72 MT in 2018-19 cargo respectively, and expected to reach 100 MT by fy 2021–22. Cargo traffic on National Waterways has increased from 18.10 MMT to 145.5 MMT between FY-14 and FY-25, recording a CAGR of 20.86%. In FY-25, traffic movement registered a growth of 9.34% year-on-year from FY-24. Five commodities i.e. coal, iron ore, iron ore fines, sand and fly ash constituted over 68% of total cargo moved on NWs during the year.

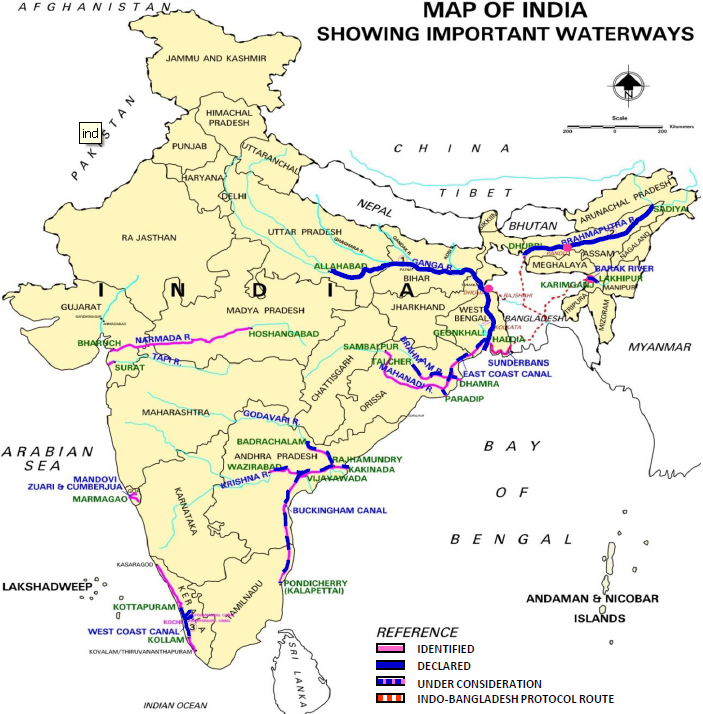
India Map

== List ==
Name	River	States	Length of NW (km)	Operational (Y/N/Partial))
NW1	Prayagraj-Haldia stretch of the Ganga-Bhagirathi-Hooghly Rivers	Uttar Pradesh, Bihar, Jharkhand, West Bengal	1620	Y
NW2	Sadiya-Dhubri stretch of Brahmaputra River	Assam	891	Y
NW3	Kollam-Kozhikode stretch of West Coast Canal and Champakara canal and Udyogmandal canal	Kerala	205	Y
NW4	Kakinada to Puducherry (Buckingham canal) Andhra Pradesh	Andhra Pradesh, Tamil Nadu and Puducherry (Yanam and Pondicherry)	1095	N
NW5	(a) Talcher-Dhamra stretch of Brahmani River-Kharsua River-Tantighai River-Pandua Nala-Dudhei Nala-Kani Dhamra River. (b) Geonkhali-Charbatia stretch of coovum Canal. (c) Harbatia-Dhamra stretch of Matai River and Mahanadi Delta Rivers	Odisha, West Bengal	623	Y
NW6	Aai River Barak River	Assam	121	Partial
NW7	Ajay River	West Bengal	96	Y
NW8	Alappuzha-Changanassery Canal	Kerala	28	Y
NW9	Alappuzha-Kottayam-Athirampuzha Canal	Kerala	38	P
NW10	Amba River	Maharashtra	45	Y
NW11	Arunavati River-Aran River	Maharastra	98	Y
NW12	Asi River	Uttar Pradesh	5.5	Y
NW13	AVM Canal	Kerala, Tamil Nadu	11	N
NW14	Baitarani River	Odisha	49	Y
NW15	Bakreshwar River-Mayurakshi River	West Bengal	137	Y
NW16	Barak River	Assam	121	Y
NW17	Beas River	Himachal Pradesh and Punjab	191	Y
NW18	Beki River	Assam	73	Y
NW19	Betwa River	Uttar Pradesh	68	Y
NW20	Bhavani River	Tamil Nadu	94	Y
NW21	Bhima River	Telangana and Karnataka	139	N
NW22	Birupa River-Badi River-Genguti River-Brahmani River	Odisha	156	N
NW23	Budhabalanga River	Odisha	56	N
NW24	Chambal River	Uttar Pradesh	60	Y
NW25	Chapora River	Goa	33	N
NW26	Chenab River	J&K and Punjab	53	Y
NW27	Cumbarjua Canal	Goa	17	N
NW28	Dabhol creek-Vashishti River	Maharashtra	45	Y
NW29	Damodar River	West Bengal	135	N
NW30	Dihing River	Assam	114	Y
NW31	Dhansiri River-Chathe River	Assam	110	N
NW32	Dikhu River	Assam	63	N
NW33	Doyans River	Assam	61	N
NW34	DVC canal	West Bengal	130	N
NW35	Dwarakeswar River	West Bengal	113	N
NW36	Dwarka River	West Bengal	121	N
NW37	Gandak River	Bihar and Uttar Pradesh	300	N
NW38	Gangadhar River	Assam and West Bengal	62	N
NW39	Ganol River	Meghalaya	49	N
NW40	Ghaghara River	Bihar and Uttar Pradesh	340	N
NW41	Ghataprabha River	Karnataka	112	N
NW42	Gomti River	Uttar Pradesh	518	N
NW43	Gurupura River	Karnataka	10	N
NW44	Ichamati River	West Bengal	64	N
NW45	Indira Gandhi Canal	Haryana, Punjab and Rajasthan	650	N
NW46	Indus River	Ladakh	35	N
NW47	Jalangi River	West Bengal	131	N
NW48	Jawai River-Luni River and Rann of Kutch	Rajasthan and Gujarat	590	N
NW49	Jhelum River	J&K	110	N
NW50	Jinjiram River	Meghalaya and Assam	43	N
NW51	Kabini River	Karnataka	23	N
NW52	Kali River	Karnataka	54	N
NW53	Kalyan-Thane-Mumbai Waterway, Vasai Creek and Ulhas River	Maharashtra	145	N
NW54	Karmanasa River	Uttar Pradesh and Bihar	86	N
NW55	Kaveri River-Kollidam River	Tamil Nadu	364	N
NW56	Kharkai River	Jharkhand	23	N
NW57	Kopili River	Assam	46	Y
NW58	Kosi River	Bihar	236	N
NW59	Kottayam-Vaikom Canal	Kerala	28	N
NW60	Kumari River	West Bengal	77	N
NW61	Kumari River	Meghalaya	28	N
NW62	Lohit River	Assam	100	N
NW63	Luni River	Rajasthan	327	N
NW64	Mahanadi River	Odisha	425	N
NW65	Mahananda River	West Bengal	81	N
NW66	Mahi River	Gujarat	248	N
NW67	Malaprabha River	Karnataka	94	N
NW68	Mandovi River	Goa	41	Y
NW69	Manimuthar River	Tamil Nadu	5	N
NW70	Manjara River	Maharashtra and Telangana	242	N
NW71	Mapusa River-Moide River	Goa	27	N
NW72	Nag River	Maharashtra	60	N
NW73	Narmada River	Gujarat	227	Y
NW74	Netravati River	Karnataka	78	N
NW75	Palar River	Tamil Nadu	141	N
NW76	Panchagangavalli River (Panchagangoli)	Karnataka	23	N
NW77	Pazhyar River	Tamil Nadu	20	N
NW78	Painganga River-Wardha River	Maharashtra and Telangana	265	N
NW79	Penna River	Andhra Pradesh	29	N
NW80	Ponnaiyar River	Tamil Nadu	125	N
NW81	Punpun River	Bihar	35	N
NW82	Puthimari River	Assam	72	N
NW83	Rajpuri creek	Maharashtra	31	Y
NW84	Ravi River	Himachal Pradesh and Jammu and Kashmir	42	N
NW85	Revdanda creek and Kundalika River	Maharashtra	31	Y
NW86	Rupnarayan River	West Bengal	72	N
NW87	Sabarmati River	Gujarat	212	N
NW88	Sal River	Goa	14	N
NW89	Savitri River and Bankot creek	Maharashtra	46	N
NW90	Sharavati river	Karnataka	29	N
NW91	Shastri River-Jaigad Fort creek	Maharashtra	52	Y
NW92	Shilabati River	West Bengal	26	N
NW93	Simsang River	Meghalaya	62	N
NW94	Son River	Bihar	160	N
NW95	Subansiri River	Assam	111	N
NW96	Subarnarekha River	Jharkhand, West Bengal and Odisha	314	N
NW97	Sunderbans waterways	West Bengal	654	Y
NW98	Sutlej River	Himachal Pradesh and Punjab	377	N
NW99	Thamirabarani River	Tamil Nadu	64	N
NW100	Tapi River	Maharashtra and Gujarat	436	Y
NW101	Tizu River and Zungki River	Nagaland	42	N
NW102	Tlwang River	Mizoram	86	N
NW103	Tons River	Uttar Pradesh	73	N
NW104	Tungabhadra River	Telangana, Karnataka and Andhra Pradesh	230	N
NW105	Udayavara River	Karnataka	16	N
NW106	Umngot River	Meghalaya	20	N
NW107	Vaigai River	Tamil Nadu	45	N
NW108	Varuna River	Uttar Pradesh	53	N
NW109	Wainganga River-Pranahita River	Maharashtra and Telangana	164	N
NW110	Yamuna River	Haryana, Uttar Pradesh and Delhi	1089	P
NW111	Zuari River	Goa	50	Y

== See also ==
- List of rivers of India
- Multi-Modal Logistics Parks in India
- National Waterways Act, 2016
- RORO ferries in India
- Sagar Mala project
- UDAN
- Waterways transport in Kerala

== Notes ==
=== NW110 ===
Wazirabad barrage (north Delhi)-Palla (disambiguation) (north Faridabad) perennial section is being developed for the passenger and cargo ferry service. Okhla barrage-Agra steamer service is planned by the end of June 2017 with the help of Netherlands (c. Feb 2017).
