= Ghogha =

- Village
- Location in Gujarat, India
- Coordinates: 21.68°N 72.28°E
- Country: India
- State: Gujarat
- District: Bhavnagar

Population (2011)
  - Total: 12,208

Languages
  - Official: Gujarati, Hindi
- Time zone: UTC+5:30 (IST)
- Postal code: 364110

Ghogha is a census town in Bhavnagar district in the state of Gujarat, India. It is situated on the mid-western bank of the Gulf of Khambhat. It was an important historical commercial port on the Arabian Sea until the development of nearby Bhavnagar in the nineteenth century.

== Demographics ==
In 1872, it had a population of 9,571.

As of the 2011 census of India, Ghogha had a population of 12,208; 49% male and 51% female, and 12.71% of the population was under 6 years of age. The average literacy rate was 70% (below the national average of 74.4%) with male literacy being 77%, and female literacy 63%.

== History ==
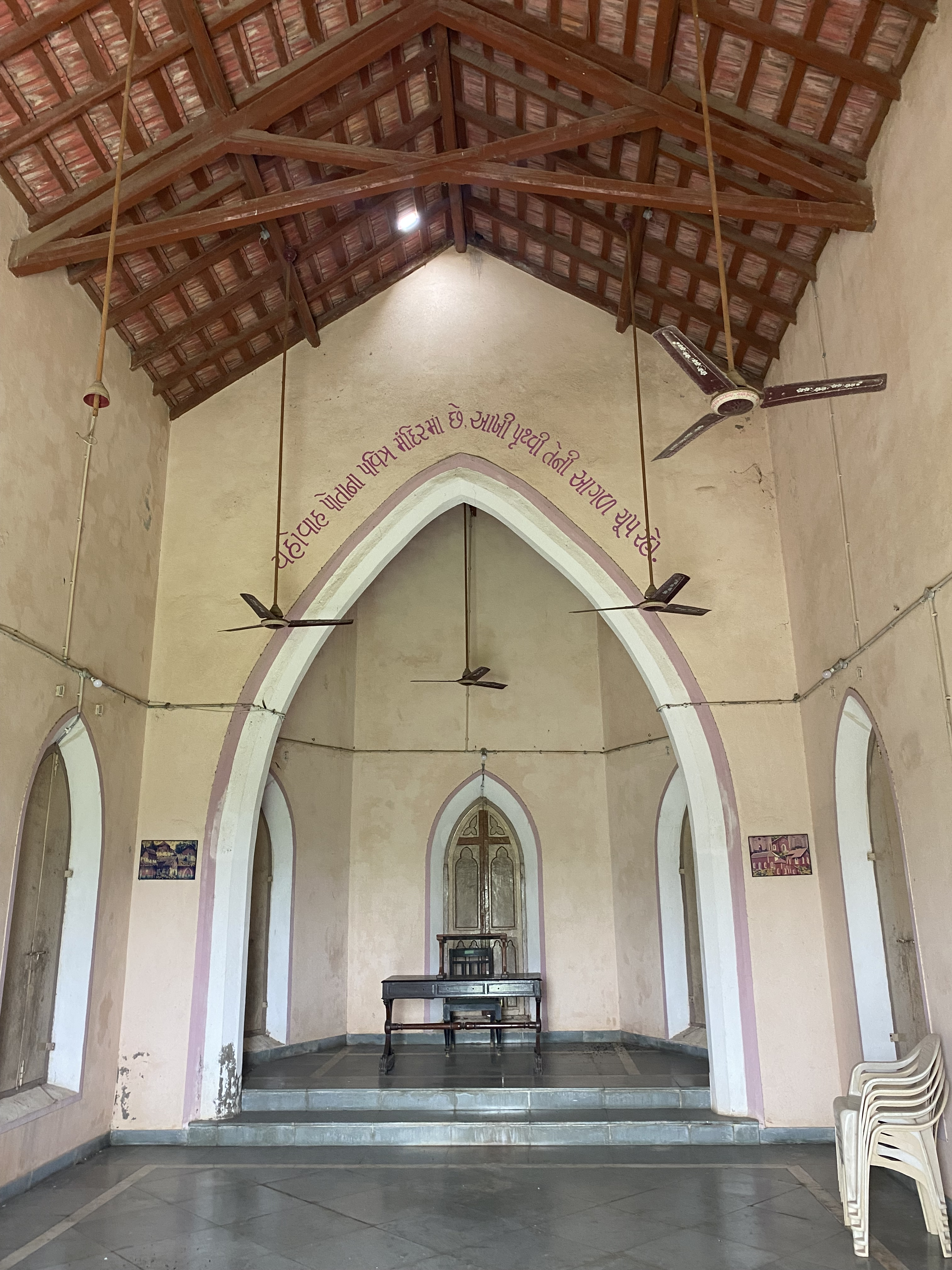
CNI Church in Ghogha

Ghogha was known as the port of Gundigar during Maitraka rule of Vallabhi (AD 480-720). Under Chaulukya dynasty rule (746-1297), except as a nursery for seamen, Ghogha was not a place of any note. One of the earliest mentions of the town is by French explorer Friar Jordanus, who, in 1321, passing north through Thane and Bharuch or as he writes it Parocco, stayed at 'Gogo'. Of the place he has left no details. At this time Ghogha is said to have been in the hands of Muslim soldiers of fortune, from whom, a few years later (1325), Mokhadaji Gohil, the Gohil chief of Umrala, took it and with the Piram Island made it his headquarters. As ruler of Piram, Mokhadaji levied toll from all ships passing up the Gulf. His exactions came to the knowledge of the emperor Muhammad bin Tughluq (1325-1351), then quelling a revolt in Gujarat, and, in 1347, Gogha was taken, Mokhadaji killed, and the Piram fort destroyed. The Emperor, satisfied with the destruction of Piram, left Gogha, at this time 'a great city with large markets,' in the hands of Dungarji, Mokhadaji's son. For about fifty years the Gohils held Ghogha. Near the close of the century (1390) they were forced to pay tribute to Muzaffar Shah I, the founder of the Gujarat Sultanate. In the fifteenth century, under the powerful Gujarat Sultanate rulers, the Gohils, though they kept their title of Ghogha chiefs, retired to Umrala. At this time Ghogha was probably under a Muslim governor. At the beginning of the sixteenth century (1503) it was entirely a Muslim town 'of great traffic in a fat and wealthy land.' Ten years later (1513), it was a very large town and a good port dealing in merchandize of all kinds and loading ships for Malabar and Aden. In the struggles for mastery at sea between the Gujarat kings and the Portuguese (1507-1538), Ghogha suffered. A strong and populous place of great trade surrounded by walls of brown stone, it was attacked and burnt by the Portuguese in 1531, and again, as it was beginning to recover, in 1546. Towards the close of the sixteenth century with the decay of Portuguese power, Ghogha seems to have regained its trade.

When taken in 1591 by Khan-i-Azam Mirza Kotaltash, one of Akbar's viceroys, Ghogha was a large, well-built port with many merchants and ships, the cargoes of which went in small boats to Cambay. It was reckoned part of Sorath and, besides port dues, yielded a yearly revenue of £1666 (666,560 dams). In 1612, on the advice of Khojah Nasar the Surat Governor, who praised its fine harbour and its trade with Cambay, the English gained leave to settle at Gogha. But the agent, Whittington, found it a poor town and no regular English factory was established. Two years later (1614), the Portuguese a third time destroyed Gogha, burning 120 trading boats and several ships, one of them the Rahimi, the great 1500 ton pilgrim ship. Following decline of Portuguese, the English were chief traders of the sea. With the Dutch, by raising Surat to be the chief port of Gujarat, the English injured the trade of the Cambay ports. Still during the seventeenth and for a few years of the eighteenth centuries, Gogha was the centre of a considerable traffic. The Portuguese boats met in its road and were convoyed to Goa by warships; and vessels belonging to the native merchants of Ahmedabad and Cambay sailed from Ghogha to south India and Arabia. Protected on the sea face by a stone fortification, and later on sheltered all round by a mud wall, with a local governor and a military force, Ghogha had a large number of traders, weavers, and sailors.

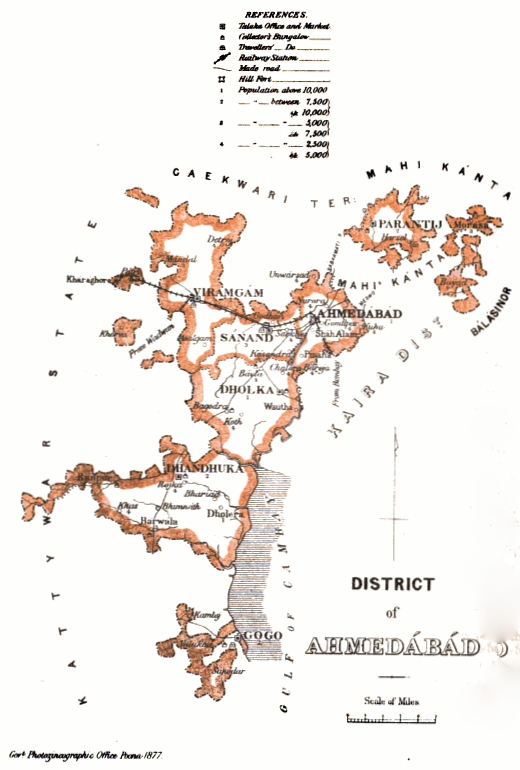
Ghogha marked as Gogo in map of Ahmedabad district under Bombay Presidency, British India 1877

The eighteenth century was a time of decay. Trade fell off, and Ghogha, handed from one Muslim noble to another (1730-1751), taken by the Peshwa (1751-1755), recovered by the Nawab of Cambay (1755), and again (1764) taken by the Peshwa, was, under his managers, little able to compete with its pushing rival Bhavnagar. In 1803, when it came under British East India Company, the trade of Ghogha was almost gone. Later it was recovered somewhat under British rule and became part of Kathiawar Agency followed by Western India States Agency in 1924. When India became independent in 1947, it became part of Bhavnagar district in Saurashtra State which was later merged with Gujarat in 1960.

== Mosque ==
Barwada Masjid is located in Ghogha, Gujarat, and has signs of having been built by Arab traders in the early 7th century.

== Inscription ==
An inscription possibly related to Kamal Hamid under Zafar Khan rule and a inscription near Gundi Gate, is mostly illegible but mentions names like “Muzaffar” and Khan Anaj.

== Ghogha in Ain-i-Akbari ==
During the Mughal period, Ghogha (then referred to as Gogo) was an important port under the rule of Emperor Akbar (14 October 1542 – 27 October 1605). According to Ain-i-Akbari (Part II) by Abul Fazl Allami, the Mughal Empire received revenue from the port costing 666,560. Ghogha and Cambay (Kambháyat) were listed as ports within the same administrative division (sarkar). Cambay was described as a large city with fine buildings, diverse merchants, and abundant trade. Goods arriving at Ghogha were transported to Cambay using smaller vessels called táwari.

The Ain-i-Akbari further notes that Ghogha was part of a district located at the foot of the Shatrunjaya hill, which also included the fort of Palitana. Though in ruins at the time, the fort was considered worthy of restoration. The island of Biram (Perim), formerly used as a governor's residence, was situated nearby. The local landholder (zamindar) belonged to the Gohel clan. The district was recorded to have 2,000 cavalry and 4,000 infantry forces.

== Notable people ==
- Gaganvihari Lallubhai Mehta (1900–1974), India's ambassador to the United States from 1952 to 1958 and recipient of the Padma Bhushan (1954) and Padma Vibhushan (1959), traced his ancestral roots to Ghogha.

== See also ==
- Kalpasar Tidal Energy Project
- Dahej–Ghogha Sea Connect
- Ghogha ROPAX Ferry Terminal
