= Sagar Mala project =

Indian shipping infrastructure project

Sagarmala Projects
- Motto: Port-led prosperity
- Country: India
- Prime Minister(s): Narendra Modi
- Ministry: Ministry of Ports, Shipping and Waterways
- Key people: Bhushan Kumar, Joint Secretary
- Established: 31 July 2015; 10 years ago
- Status: Active
- Website: www.sagarmala.gov.in

The Sagarmala Programme (transl. Garland of the Sea) is an initiative by the Government of India to enhance the performance of the country's logistics sector. The programme envisages unlocking the potential of waterways and the coastline to minimize infrastructural investments required to meet these targets.

The Sagarmala Programme is the flagship programme of the Ministry of Ports, Shipping and Waterways to promote port-led development in the country. Maritime sector in India has been the backbone of the country's trade and has grown manifold over the years. To harness India's 7,517 km long coastline, 14,500 km of potentially navigable waterways and strategic location on key international maritime trade routes, the Government of India has embarked upon the ambitious Sagarmala Programme which aims to promote port-led development in the country. The concept of Sagarmala was approved by the Union Cabinet on 25 March 2015.

The vision of Sagarmala is to reduce logistics costs for both domestic and EXIM cargo with minimal infrastructure investment. Studies under Sagarmala have identified opportunities for reducing overall logistics costs, thereby improving the overall efficiency of the economy, and increasing the competitiveness of exports.

Sagarmala both enabler and beneficiary of other key Government of India schemes, such as Industrial corridor, Make in India, Startup India, Standup India, Setu Bharatam, Dedicated Freight Corridors, Bharatmala, UDAN-RCS, Digital India, BharatNet, Parvatmala.

== Background ==
As part of the Programme, a National Perspective Plan (NPP) for the comprehensive development of India's coastline and maritime sector was prepared which was released by the Hon'ble Prime Minister, during the Maritime India Summit 2016.

The projects under the scheme have been categorized into five pillars:

1. Port modernization & new port development,
2. Port connectivity enhancement,
3. Port-led industrialization,
4. Coastal community development and
5. Coastal shipping and Inland water transport

Initial source of project list for inclusion of projects in Sagarmala was National Perspective Plan (NPP) prepared along with Master Planning of Major Ports. Subsequently, the projects were added based on the meetings of National and State Steering Committees of Sagarmala and in consultation with major ports and other relevant stakeholders. Further, certain project proposals were also received for funding from various implementing agencies. Projects aligned with Sagarmala objectives were made part of the Programme.

The National Sagarmala Apex Committee (NSAC) is composed of the Minister of Shipping with Cabinet Ministers from stakeholder ministries and ministers in charge of ports in India's maritime states. The NSAC approved the overall National Perspective Plan (NPP) and regularly reviews the progress of implementation of these plans.

To assist in the implementation of Sagarmala projects, the Sagarmala Development Company Limited (SDCL) was incorporated on 31 August 2016, after receiving Cabinet approval on 20 July 2016, for providing funding support to project SPVs and projects in-line with Sagarmala objectives. Additionally, SDCL is also in the process of preparation of Detailed Project Report (DPRs) and feasibility studies for specific projects that could provide avenues for future equity investment by the company. The Sagarmala Development Company was incorporated after approval from the Indian Cabinet on 20 July 2016 with an initial authorized share capital of ₹1,000 crore and subscribed share capital of ₹90 crore, to give a push to port-led development.

The Indian Port Rail & Ropeway Corporation Limited (IPRCL) was incorporated on 10 July 2015 to undertake the port-rail connectivity projects under Sagarmala Programme.

The Sagarmala National Perspective Plan was released by the Prime Minister on 14 April 2016 at the maiden Maritime India Summit 2016, with details on Project Plan and Implementation.

== Synopsis of projects under Sagarmala ==
Under Sagarmala Programme, 839 projects, at an estimated investment of approximately ₹5.79 lakh crore, for implementation by 2035, out of which, 241 projects worth ₹1.22 lakh crore have been completed and 234 projects worth ₹1.8 Lakh Crore are under implementation. In addition to the above, 364 projects worth ₹2.78 Lakh crore are under various stages of development. These projects are being implemented by relevant central ministries, state governments, major ports. Regular monitoring of the projects and interaction with project proponents, various line ministries and implementing agencies is being done with MIS tool. These projects are categorized into five pillars – Port Modernization, Port Connectivity, Port-Led Industrialization, Coastal Community Development and Coastal Shipping & Inland Water Transport. Under holistic development of coastal districts, a total of 567 projects with an estimated cost of around ₹58,000 crores have been identified. The details are as below.

Project Theme	No. of Projects	Project Cost
Port Modernisation	234	₹291,622 million
Port Connectivity	279	₹206,363 million
Port-Led Industrialisation	14	₹55,887 million
Coastal Community Development	81	₹11,573 million
Coastal Shipping and IWT	231	₹14,526 million
Total	839	₹5,79,971 million (equivalent to ₹810 billion, US$8.5 billion or €7.4 billion in 2023)

Over the last few years, the Government has taken a number of modernization, mechanization, and digital transformation measures to reduce cost and time in international trade and improve ease-of-doing Business. Ministry is planning expansion of Port capacity through the implementation of well-conceived infrastructure development projects, increasing the efficiency of Port operations through the implementation of a package of recommendations to cut time and cost, digitization of processes to reduce and finally eliminate human interface and to strongly address environment related concerns.

Under the budget head of Sagarmala, 171 projects worth ₹11,000 crores have been sanctioned with funding support of ₹4,570 crores. Out of total 171 projects sanctioned under Sagarmala, 55 projects worth ₹3,400 crores have been completed and 68 projects worth ₹6,000 crores have been awarded and are under implementation. Remaining projects are under development stages. These projects are focusing on various critical aspects of maritime sector such as capacity enhancement at Indian ports, improving connectivity infrastructure, RO-RO, and tourism jetties along with urban water transportation, fishing harbor and skill development of coastal community.

Under Sagarmala Programme,20 projects with a total investment of ₹11,620 crores have been completed in the calendar year 2023, out of which 4 projects focused on Port Modernization, 14 projects on port connectivity, and 2 projects under the pillar of coastal shipping and IWT. Out of these 20 projects, 6 projects have been supported financially under the Sagarmala scheme.

Major projects which have been completed in 2023 includes Bunker Berth at Bharathi Dock in Chennai Port, Breakwater in North and South side of entrance channel& Capital Dredging at Cuddalore Port, Capital Dredging for Puducherry Port, Ro-Pax Facility at Hazira, 12 m wide concrete road connecting berth 5 6 7 8 & 9 to new entry / exit road at Mormugao Port, and Improvement of road connectivity to facilitate trade and port users at Kolkata Dock, Phase-2.

Port-modernization under Sagarmala

Giving special emphasis to modernization of Indian ports under Sagarmala, a total of 234 projects at cost of ₹291,622 lakh crore have been undertaken for implementation by 2035. Out of which, 94 projects worth ₹31,500 crores have been completed. 65 and 75 projects are under implementation and development stages respectively. These projects under the modernization pillar are further divided into 4 categories –New Ports, Port Modernization – Major Ports, Port Modernization – Non-Major Ports, Ship Repair projects.

At Major Ports, 170 projects worth ₹1.6 lakh crores are being implemented in India. Projects under this category have been largely identified through Detailed Master Planning exercise carried out under Sagarmala Programme. Out of 170 projects, 90 projects worth ₹26,000 crores have been completed. Further, 38 projects worth ₹22,000 crores have been awarded and are under implementation. Balance 42 projects worth ₹1.1 lakh crore are under various stages of development.

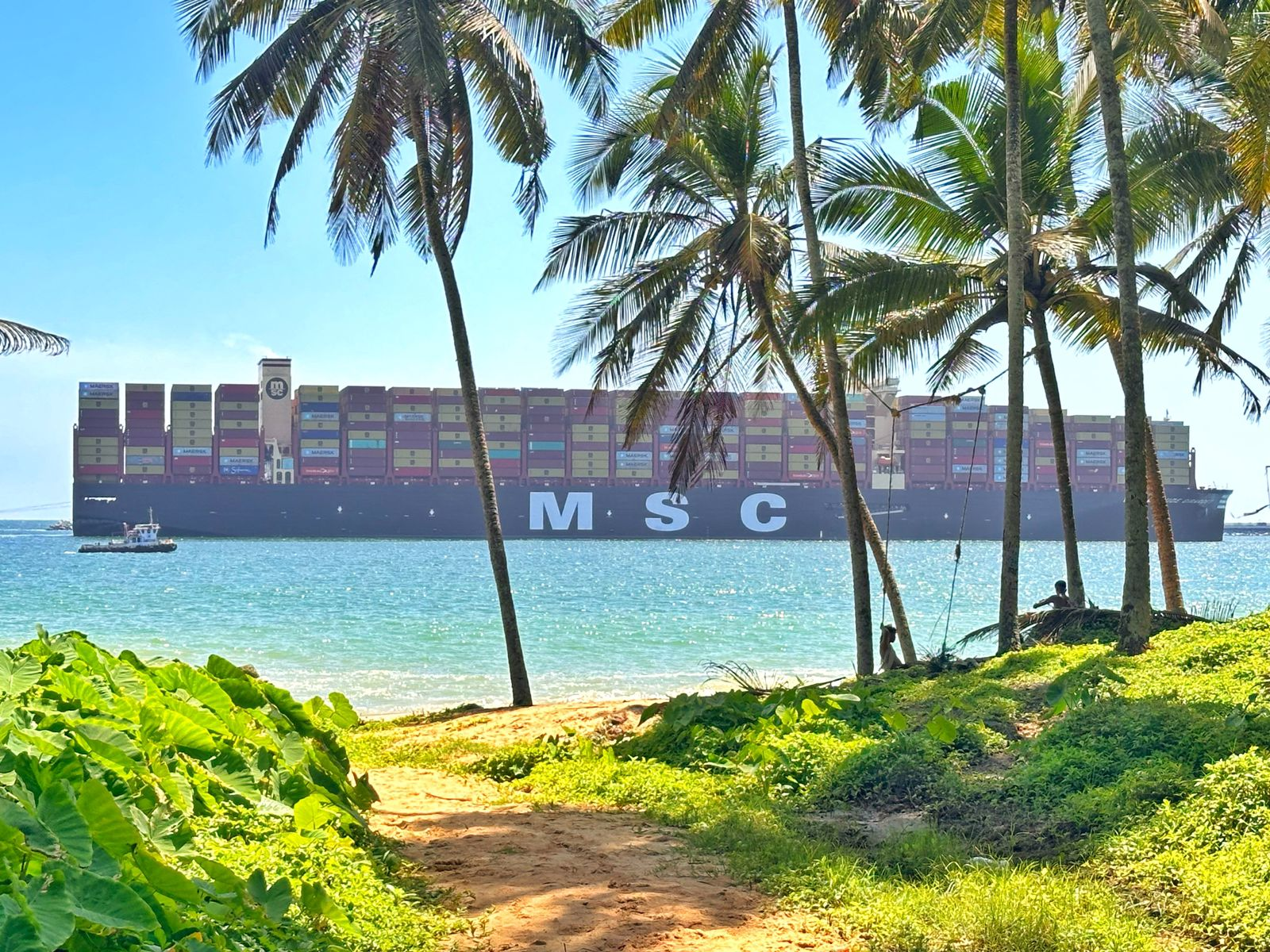
Ultra large container vessel MSC Claude Girardet the largest vessel to berth in South Asia arriving at Vizhinjam International Seaport Thiruvananthapuram, India

There are 57 projects worth ₹80,000 crores identified under the Sagarmala Programme for implementation at Non-Major Ports. 4 projects worth ₹5,400 crores have been completed so far whereas 24 projects worth ₹52,000 crores are under implementation. The remaining 29 projects worth ₹23,000 crores are under various stages of development. 31 projects out of 45 are being implemented in PPP mode with a total investment of ₹46,000 crores. The Ministry is also financially supporting several projects at non-major ports to enhance their capacity and efficiency during operations. Project of construction of breakwaters and dredging at Cuddalore port is completed. Dredging at Puducherry port is 100% supported under Sagarmala and coastal berths have been planned at Old Mangaluru Port, Karwar, and Diu.

== Port connectivity under Sagarmala ==
The Sagarmala Programme has identified connectivity between ports and domestic production and consumption centers through rail, road, pipeline, MMLP under the dedicated pillar of port connectivity, consisting of 279 projects of total worth ₹206,363 lakh crore which are being undertaken by various implementing agencies. Out of these, 83 projects worth ₹43,300 crores have been completed and 66 projects worth ₹79,600 crores have been awarded and are under implementation. Remaining, 130 projects worth ₹83,400 crores are under development.

Further, a Comprehensive Port Connectivity Plan (CPCP) was prepared by DPIIT in September 2022, in consultation with MoPSW, MoR, MoRTH, and State Maritime Boards. CPCP identified 100+ new road and rail connectivity infrastructure gaps, many of which have been included in the Sagarmala Programme.

There are 114 port-rail connectivity projects under Sagarmala which are being implemented by Indian Railways, Major Ports, and State Govts. Out of these,49 projects worth ₹26,390 Cr. are completed adding 1,675 kms of rail, and 28 projects worth ₹43,000 Cr. are under implementation. Further, 37 projects worth ₹31,000 Cr. are under development. These projects will help in integrating port rail and road connectivity resulting in a reduction in logistics costs for the EXIM business.

There are 152 port-road connectivity projects identified under Sagarmala which are being implemented by MoRTH / NHAI, Major Ports, and State Govts. Out of these, 26 projects worth ₹9,600 Cr. are completed adding 500 kms of roads and 36 projects worth ₹37,000 Cr. are under implementation, Further, 90 projects worth ₹51,000 Cr. are under development.

'Report on Connectivity of Ports to Industrial Nodes' has been prepared by MoPSW wherein an assessment and gap analysis of connectivity or ports vis-a-viz all the existing and upcoming nodes under different industrial corridors under NICDIT has been done. The report has identified 62 new road and rail infrastructure gaps. The report was shared with MoR and MoRTH in October 2023 with request for further actions regarding the projects proposed in the report.

== Port-led industrialization under Sagarmala ==
Port-led industrialization focuses on reducing logistics costs by locating industries at the ports. There are overall 14 projects worth ₹55,800 crores have been identified for implementation under Sagarmala. Out of which, 9 projects worth ₹45,865 crores have been completed and 5 projects worth Rs. ₹10,000 crores are under various stages of implementation and development. These projects are further divided into 3 categories – Industrial Cluster, Smart Industrial Port City (SIPC) / Special Economic Zone (SEZ) and Thermal Power Plant.

== Coastal community development under Sagarmala ==
The coastal community is considered as one of the key stakeholders of the Sagarmala Programme and hence, ensuring their socio-economic well-being is considered as one of the major objectives. 81 projects at a cost of ₹11,500 crores have been undertaken for implementation. Out of which, 21 projects worth ₹1,500 crores have been completed and 60 Projects worth ₹10,000 crores are under various stages of implementation and development.

Ministry of Rural Development (MoRD) and MoPSW have renewed the MoU to enable skill development of coastal population under DDU-GKY Sagarmala Convergence Programme. Under this convergence, the entire funding support is being provided by MoPSW and implementation and management is carried out by MoRD. More than 5,900 candidates have been trained under this convergence. Multi Skill Development Center (MSDC) is already operational at Jawaharlal Nehru Port Authority (JNPA). More than 2,300 candidates have been trained in this centre. Centre of Excellence in Maritime and Shipbuilding (CEMS), a first of its kind in Asia having two campuses with 24 laboratories in total (6 laboratories in IRS Mumbai and 18 in Indian Maritime University campus in Vishakhapatnam). The Institute provides 50 courses at its campuses for engineering, polytechnic, and graduate students. Institute has trained more than 13,000 candidates.

Fisheries

There are 37 fishing harbour projects worth ₹6,500 crores being implemented under the Sagarmala Programme. MoPSW is part-funding 26 fishing harbour projects worth ₹3,700 crore and has sanctioned ₹960 crores. 9 out of 26 projects with a financial assistance of ₹144.5 crore have been completed. Additionally, 5 fishing harbours adjacent to Major ports namely Kochi, Chennai, Visakhapatnam, Paradip, and Mallet Bunder have been sanctioned for modernization and up-gradation. Out of 37 fishing harbour projects, 10 projects worth ₹640 crores are completed, 27 projects worth ₹5,900 crores are under various stages of implementation and development. Further, 50 locations have been identified in Phase I for implementation of floating jetties in the Andhra Pradesh, Tamil Nadu, Puducherry, Karnataka, and Kerala. 20 locations have already been provided in-principle approval from the Ministry

Coastal Shipping & IWT

MoPSW under the Sagarmala Programme aims to promote urban waterways passenger transportation (RoPax/ Passenger ferry service) ecosystem in the country. This mode of transportation has proved to have multiple benefits over other modes of transportation such as improved cargo delivery and minimize passenger travel time, reduced risk of accidents, improved operational speed, low-cost transportation, lower fuel consumption, lower congestion on roads and rail, lowered air, noise, and land pollution, along with providing seamless travel to passengers, and vehicles.

Under Sagarmala, there are 63 projects worth ₹2,066 crores at 57 different locations of which 10 projects worth ₹527 crores at 07 locations have already been completed. Out of which 4 operational locations are namely, Hazira in the state of Gujarat and Mandwa, KanhojiAngre Island, and Belapur in the state of Maharashtra. The operational terminals in the state of Maharashtra have also enabled routes to Elephanta Islands, Navi Mumbai, JNPA and DCT Mumbai.

The Ro-Pax and Passenger ferry service has reduced the travel time on routes as follow-

Ro-Pax and Passenger Ferry Service	Reduced Travel Time
Mumbai- Mandwa	3 hrs to 45 mins
Belapur- Elephanta island	2.15 hrs to 30 mins
Belapur- JNPA	45 mins to 30 mins
Belapur- Mumbai	1.30 hrs to 20 mins
Belapur- Mandwa	2 hrs to 45 mins
Hazira- Ghogha	10 hrs to 4 hrs

The services have benefitted more than 30 lakh passengers, transported more than 5 lakh passenger vehicles and more than one lakh cargo carrying trucks, thereby saving more than 2 crore liters of fuel and nearly 44 MT of carbon emissions. Additionally, these projects have brought in tourism in the region with activities such as bird watching (flamingo's) and water sports.

In addition, there are 18 projects worth ₹2,139 crore which focuses on providing infrastructure for coastal handling of cargo. 5 projects worth ₹321 crores have been completed, 5 projects are currently under implementation and 8 more projects are under various stages of development. 5 projects are being implemented at major ports whereas 13 projects are for improving coastal infrastructure at non-major ports.

National Maritime Heritage Museum, Lothal

India has a rich maritime heritage, and the earliest maritime evidence dates back to around 4500 years. To showcase India's rich and diverse maritime heritage, Ministry of Ports, Shipping and Waterways (MoPSW) has envisioned the development of a National Maritime Heritage Complex (NMHC) at Lothal near Ahmedabad. Lothal is one among the prominent cities of the traditional Harappan civilization, dating to 2400 BC, located in Gujarat. NMHC will not only curate and present diverse & rich artefacts from ancient to modern times from across India but also inspire the public and make them aware of and learn about our glorious maritime heritage.

The NMHC project, is envisaged to be one of the largest maritime complexes in the world which is aimed to be developed as a world class and unique complex having a comprehensive integration of past, present, and future maritime activities, edutainment through interactive and experiential holistic learning, depiction of life size architecture of Lothal, etc. The project components of NMHC include NMHC museum with 14 galleries, Lothal Town and Open Aquatic Gallery, Lighthouse Museum, Bagicha Complex, Coastal State Pavilions and Recreation of Lothal city, Eco resorts and Museuotel, Theme based parks, Maritime research institute and hostel, etc. The NMHC project will not only boost tourism but will also generate employment in large numbers and will also help in reviving the local businesses of the region.

The foundation stone of the project was laid by Hon'ble Prime Minister in March 2019. MoPSW has appointed Indian Ports Association as the nodal agency, while Indian Port Rail Corporation Ltd (IPRCL) as executing agency of the project. The masterplan of the project has been prepared by renowned architecture firm M/s Architect Hafeez Contractor and the construction of phase 1A has been entrusted to Tata Projects Ltd. The Govt. of Gujarat has transferred a land of 400 acres for the project development and has also undertaken the development of external infrastructure and part of basic internal infrastructure of the project.

== Turnaround Time ==
Indian Ports Average Turnaround time
Si.No	Year	Turn Around time (in hour)
1	1990–91	194
2	2000–01	127
3	2009–10	111
4	2010–11	102
5	2013–14	94
6	2015–16	84
7	2019–20	65
8	2021–22	55
9	2022–23	53
10	2023–24	48
11	2025–26	22

== See also ==
- Targeted projects
  - Bharatmala, India's project to connect all district headquarters with highways
  - Diamond Quadrilateral, Subsumed in Bharatmala
  - Golden Quadrilateral, India's project to connect major cities of India forming a quadrilateral
  - Parvatmala, India's project for nation-wide cable car transportation
  - Setu Bharatam, India's project to make all national highways free of railway crossings
  - UDAN, India's project for regional civil aviation connectivity
- Transport in India
  - List of ports in India
  - Future of rail transport in India
  - Expressways of India
  - List of national highways in India
  - Indian Human Spaceflight Programme
  - Multi-Modal Logistics Parks in India
  - RORO ferries in India
