= Kerala State Road Transport Corporation =

Transport corporation of Kerala

- Trade name: KSRTC
- Formerly: Travancore State Transport Department (TSTD) (1938 - 1965)
- Type: Public
- Industry: Public transport bus service
- Predecessor: Travancore State Transport Department
- Founded: 20 February 1938; 88 years ago as Travancore State Transport Department (TSTD); 1 April 1965; 61 years ago as Kerala State Road Transport Corporation (KSRTC)
- Founder: Chithira Thirunal Balarama Varma Government of Kerala
- Headquarters: S-301, 3rd Floor, South Block, Government Secretariat, Thiruvananthapuram, Kerala, India
- Number of locations: 93 Bus Depots (2025)
- Areas served: Kerala; Tamil Nadu; Karnataka; Mahe District of Puducherry
- Key people: C. P. John (Minister for Transport); T. V. Anupama IAS (Transport Secretary to Government); P.S.Pramoj Sanker IOFS, (Chairman & Managing Director)
- Brands: Garuda Maharaja; Garuda King Class; Gajaraj; Minnal; Super Deluxe Air Bus; Sabari Air Bus; Super Express Air Bus; Super Fast Passenger; Limited Stop Super Fast; Fast Passenger; Super Fast Premium A/C; Business Class
- Services: Bus transport; Courier service
- Revenue: ▲₹3,185.54 crore (US$330 million) (2023–24)
- Net income: ▼₹−1,314.05 crore (US$−140 million) (2023–24)
- Owner: Government of Kerala
- Divisions: Zonal divisions: South; Central; North; District Offices: 14
- Subsidiaries: Kerala Urban Road Transport Corporation (KURTC); KSRTC SWIFT
- Website: keralartc.com

Kerala State Road Transport Corporation (KSRTC) is a state-owned road transport corporation in the Indian state of Kerala. It is one of the country's oldest state-run public bus transport services. The corporation is divided into three zones (South, Central and North), and its headquarters is in the state capital Thiruvananthapuram. Daily scheduled service has increased from 1,500,000 kilometres (930,000 mi) to 1,700,000 kilometres (1,100,000 mi), using 5400 buses on 4500 routes. The corporation transports an average of 3.545 million commuters per day.

The Kerala Urban Road Transport Corporation (KURTC) was formed under KSRTC in 2015 to manage affairs related to urban transportation. It was inaugurated on 12 April 2015 at Thevara. On 9 November 2021, a legally independent company called KSRTC SWIFT was formed to operate the long-distance buses of the Kerala Road Transport Corporation for a period of 10 years with an aim overcome the financial crisis faced by the corporation.

In June 2021, Kerala SRTC was awarded the acronym KSRTC by the Controller General of Patents Designs and Trade Marks, which is part of the Ministry of Commerce and Industry, Government of India when Kerala (officially known as Keralam) filed a case against Karnataka SRTC in response to a legal notice by the Karnataka SRTC to stop using the acronym KSRTC.

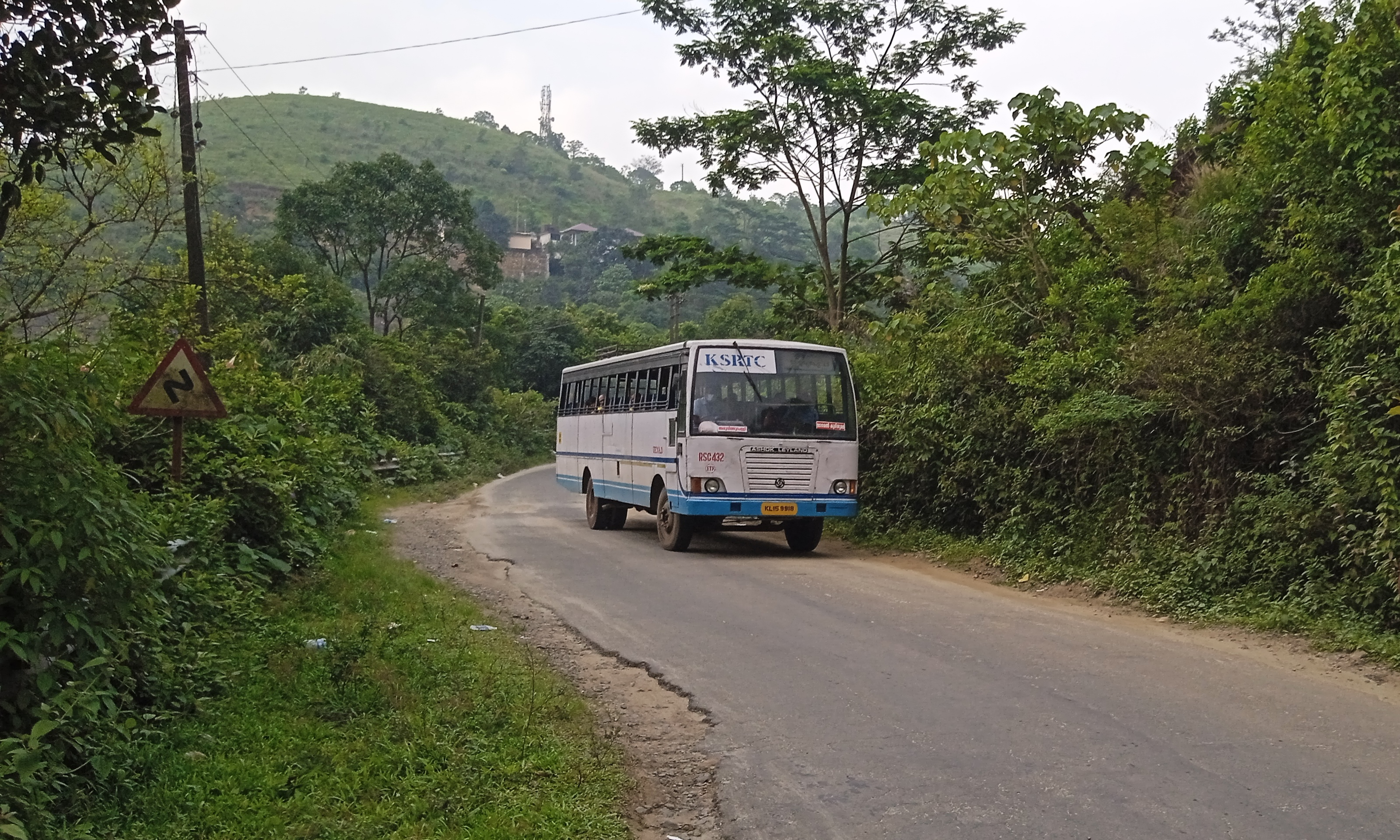
KSRTC Bus at Vagamon

== History ==
=== Travancore State Transport Department ===
The corporation's history dates back to years before the formation of Kerala state, which makes it one of the oldest state-operated public road transport services in India. The Travancore government, headed by King Chithira Thirunal Balarama Varma, decided to establish the Travancore State Transport Department (TSTD) the predecessor of KSRTC, to improve the existing public-transport system.

Initially, the department imported 60 Commer PNF3 chassis from England. Under the supervision of E.G Salter, the then Assistant Operating Superintendent of London Passenger Transport Board, the imported chassis were fitted with Perkins Lynx diesel engines. The bus bodies were built by department staff, and Travancore Dewan C. P. Ramaswami Iyer insisted on using local wood. The body shop (supervised by Salter) was originally in Chakai, and was later moved to Pappanamcode. Salter's experimental body design became standard on the rest of the buses.

Most of the private operators on the Thiruvananthapuram-Kanyakumari route had to close when the roads were nationalized, and many experienced drivers, conductors, and inspectors lost their jobs. TSTD recruited them, and Salter selected 60 people out of 81 applicants. Nearly one hundred applicants with bachelor's degrees were employed as inspectors and conductors.

The state road-transport service was inaugurated on 20 February 1938 by Maharaja Sree Chithira Thirunal, who (with his family, Col. Goda Varma Raja, and other dignitaries) rode the first bus on the Main Road to Kowdiar Square; Salter drove the bus. A fleet of 33 buses and a large crowd joined in the celebration. On 21 February 1938, the first bus operated from Thiruvananthapuram to Kanyakumari.

The early buses had 23 leather seats. Entry was through the rear, and the buses had a centre aisle. Ten first-class seats were in the front. Schedules, fares and stops were published, and a parcel service began in which goods could be delivered by designated agents. Conductors wore khaki with a white topi, and inspectors wore khaki. Conductors had machines to issue tickets. Later buses were manufactured by Dodge, Fargo, Bedford, and Chevrolet.

The TSTD operated on three routes: Thiruvananthapuram-Nagercoil, Nagercoil-Kanyakumari, and Nagercoil-Colachal. Regular service began on 21 February 1938 with 39 buses. The minimum fare for one mile was one-half chakram The next fare was one chakram, and first-class tickets were 50 percent more. Children under age three travelled free, and those between three and 14 paid half the fare. Luggage under 28 pounds (13 kg) was free; 28–56 pounds (13–25 kg) was four chakrams, and 56–112 pounds (25–51 kg) was six chakrams.

The Motor Vehicle Act was passed in 1939. Bus service was extended to Kochi in 1949, and to the Malabar region in 1956.

=== Kerala State Road Transport Corporation ===
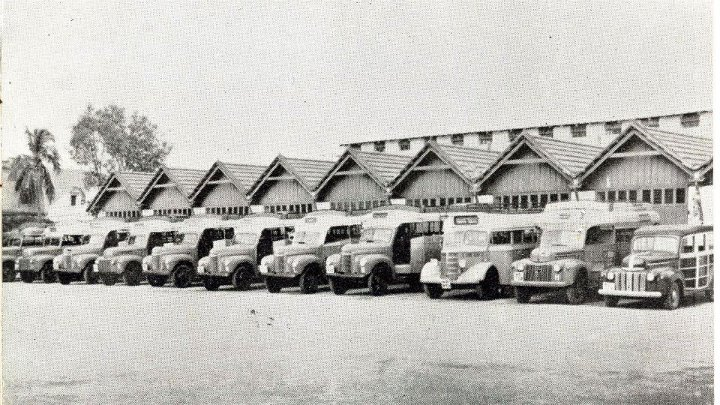
Thrissur KSRTC bus station during the 1950s

The Kerala State Road Transport Corporation (KSRTC) was established by the Kerala government on 15 March 1965 after the Road Transport Corporation Act, which came into force in 1950. The Transport Department became an autonomous corporation on 1 April 1965.

At the time, there were 661 bus routes and 36 lorry routes. The corporation's fleet consisted of 901 buses, 51 lorries, and 29 other vehicles; thirty buses and eight lorries were new. Ten old buses, seven lorries, and one tractor-trailer were converted to other uses. The KLX registration series was reserved for the KSRTC. On 1 July 1989, KSRTC buses began registration at a dedicated RTO in Thiruvananthapuram with the KL-15 registration series.

In 2001 K. B. Ganesh Kumar became transport minister, and his brief tenure brought beneficial changes to the corporation. KSRTC was the first state-run transport corporation to introduce Volvo buses into its fleet. Body work was outsourced, and the buses' contemporary design was publicized as high-tech. Kumar commissioned Sabu Cyril to redesign the bus livery. Low-entry, air suspension buses were introduced in Thiruvananthapuram, and minibus service began. The changes attracted passengers, making the corporation profitable.

The Kerala government issued a notification in 2012 suspending new permits for inter-district buses, exempting the KSRTC. Although it was assumed that the corporation would assume those routes, it created a shortage of service from Kochi to several northern districts. CPPR research and projects director Madhu Sivaraman conducted a study of KSRTC-private bus options.

The Kerala Urban Road Transport Corporation (KURTC) was formed under KSRTC in 2015 to manage affairs related to urban transportation. It was inaugurated on 12 April 2015 at Thevara.

On 2 June 2021, the rights to use the acronym KSRTC, logo and the name 'AanaVandi' were fully given to Kerala State Road Transport Corporation according to the trademarks act 1999, after a seven-year battle with the Karnataka State Road Transport Corporation, who issued a notice in 2014, stating that Kerala should stop using KSRTC. After the long drawn-out battle over intellectual property rights, the Kerala Road Transport Corporation has got the legal right to its trademarks acronym 'KSRTC' associated with the state-run transport corporation. Trade Marks registry certified that the emblem, the abbreviation KSRTC, logo and the name Aanavandi shall belong to Kerala Road Transport corporation. Kerala's claim was approved on 3 June 2021 by the Controller General of Patents Design and Trade Marks under the Ministry of Commerce and Industry. The registration made Kerala RTC the lone custodian of the trademarks.

On 21 June 2021, KSRTC launched its first LNG bus service from Thiruvananthapuram to Kochi for regular passengers. The first commercial LNG bus service had been launched exclusively for Petronet employees in Kochi earlier.

On 9 November 2021, KSRTC-SWIFT was formed as an independent company to operate the long-distance buses of KSRTC efficiently for a period of 10 years.

== Organizational Structure ==
The management of the KSRTC is overseen by a Board of Directors, which includes the Chairman-cum-Managing Director (CMD) and other directors appointed by the Government of Kerala. The CMD, serving as the organization's Chief Executive, is responsible for managing day-to-day operations.

=== Board of Directors ===
Board of Directors – KSRTC
| Name | Designation |
|---|---|
| C.P. John | Minister for Transport, Government of Kerala |
| P.B. Nooh, IAS | Secretary to Government, Transport Department |
| P.S. Pramoj Sanker, IOFS | Chairman & Managing Director |
| Ch. Nagaraju, IPS | Director (Transport Commissioner) |
| Nelson J | Director (Additional Secretary, Finance Department) |
| K.S. Vijayasree | Director (Additional Secretary, Transport Department) |
| Dr. Samson Mathew | Director (National Transportation Planning and Research Centre (NATPAC)) |
| N. Jeevan | Director (Additional Law Secretary, Law Department) |

== Fleet ==
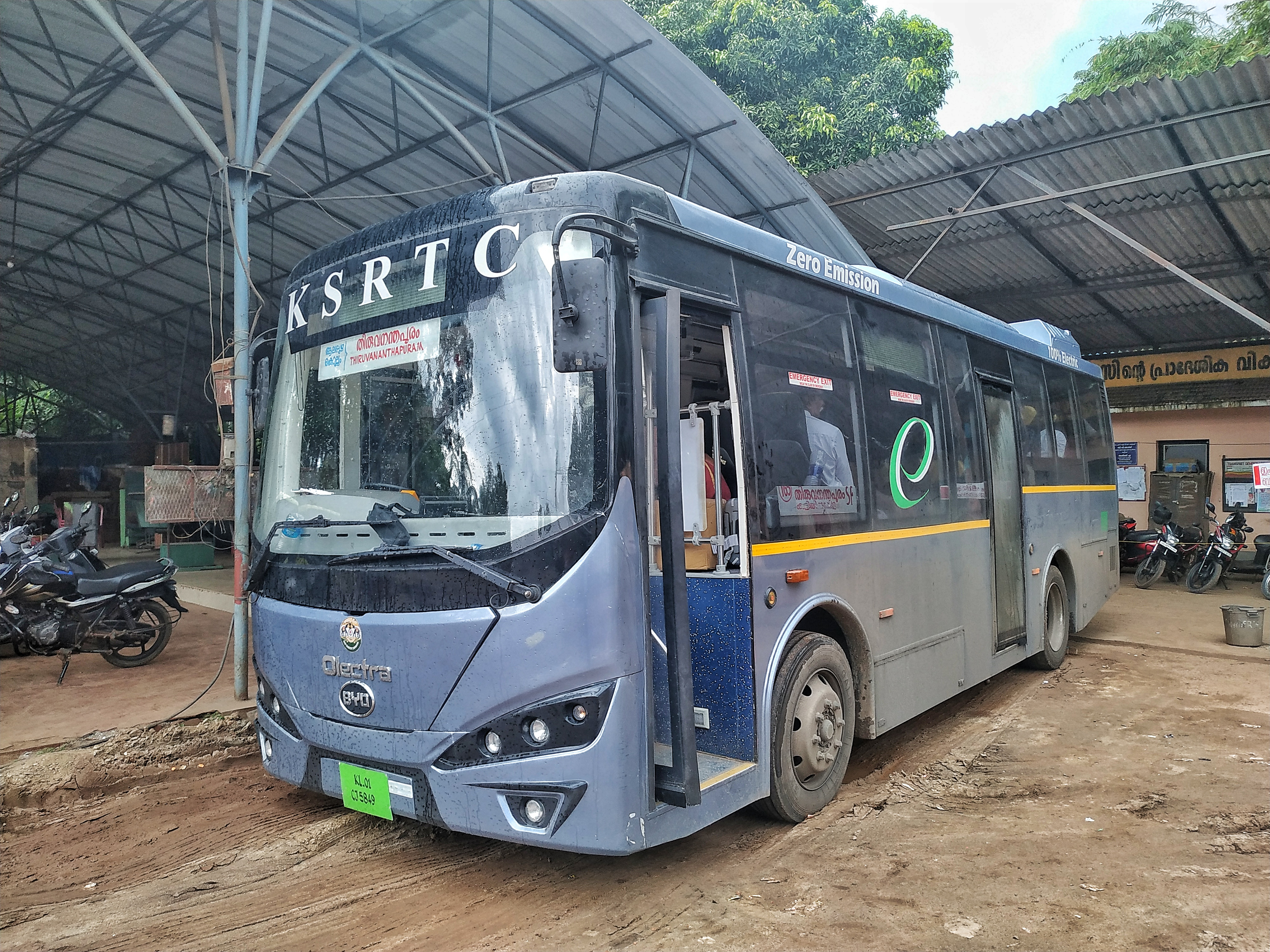
Electric bus

As of 2026, the corporation has a fleet of more than 5500 buses consisting of buses from Volvo, Scania, Ashok Leyland, Tata Motors, Eicher Motors, BharatBenz and others. The vehicles owned by KSRTC are registered under a dedicated RTO at Thiruvananthapuram with a registration series KL-15.

=== Fleet numbering system ===
Although KSRTC has a dedicated RTO (Regional Transport Officer) to register its fleet, all its buses have bonnet numbers (for internal identification) adjacent to the depot mark at the front of the vehicle. RPE981, a typical fleet number, can be split into three parts: RP, E and 981. RP indicates the vehicle series, derived from the word transport; each series contains 1,000 vehicles. During the 1960s, KSRTC began assigning the serial number T to its buses; R followed the first 1,000 buses, followed by A and so on until the P series. Repetitive letters and the letter O were exempted. Later, two-letter combinations were used to identify bus series. The 1,000th bus in each series is numbered with a multiple of 1,000, indicating the total number of buses introduced by the corporation.

| T | 1962 - 1966 |
| R | 1966 - 1971 |
| A | 1973 - 1978 |
| N | 1979 - 1983 |
| S | 1983 - 1986 |
| P | 1986 - 1989 |
| TR | 1989 – 1993 |
| TA | 1993 – 1995 |
| TN | 1995 – 1997 |
| TS | 1997 – 2000 |
| TP | 2000 – 2004 |
| RT | 2004 – 2006 |
| RR | 2006 – 2008 |
| RA | 2008 – 2010 |
| RN | 2010 – 2012 |
| RS | 2012 – 2015 |
| RP | 2015 - 2016 |
| AT | 2016 - |

The second part (E in the example) denotes the KSRTC workshop where the body work was done, and is absent on buses purchased fully built and outsourced bodywork. KSRTC owns five workshops: one central and four regional:

| Code | Workshop |
|---|---|
| C | Central Workshop, Pappanamcode, Thiruvananthapuram |
| M | Regional Workshop, Mavelikkara |
| A | Regional Workshop, Aluva |
| E | Regional Workshop, Edappal |
| K | Regional Workshop, Kozhikode |

The third part is the vehicle number of the series. In addition to this system, a TE was assigned to 144 buses built in Edappal from 1997 to 2003. Their depot vehicles are numbered in a D series, and the oil tankers are numbered in a TT series. The corporation has several ambulances, numbered AV. Buses procured as part of the Jawaharlal Nehru National Urban Renewal Mission are numbered JN. KSRTC Swift's buses are numbered in a KS series.

=== 2025 Fleet Modernisation ===
KSRTC inducted 143 new buses in 2025 as part of a major fleet modernisation. Chief Minister Pinarayi Vijayan flagged off the vehicles at a function in Anayara on 21 August 2025. These buses were divided into nine categories:

- Ordinary
- Link Bus
- Fast Passenger
- Super fast Premium
- AC Seater
- AC Seater cum Sleeper
- AC Sleeper
- AC Seater Multi axle
- AC Sleeper Multi axle

=== Details of New Buses ===
| Bus Type | Vehicle Manufacturer | Length | Seating/Berth Capacity | Engine | Suspension | Body Builder |
|---|---|---|---|---|---|---|
| Ordinary | Eicher | 8.235 m | 28 + 1 + 1 (2x2 layout) | 4 Cylinder Front Diesel Engine, 120 HP | Semi Elliptical | Audi Automobiles, Pithampur (Dhar) |
| Link Bus | Ashok Leyland | 10.5 m | 38 + 1 (2x2 layout) | 4 Cylinder Front Diesel Engine, 147 HP | Front & Rear Parabolic | SM Kannappa Automobiles Pvt Ltd, Bangalore (PRAKASH) |
| Fast Passenger | TATA | 11.250 m | 49 + D (3x2 layout) | 6 Cylinder Front Diesel Engine, 180 HP | Front & Rear Leaf Spring | Automobile Corporation of Goa Ltd. (ACGL) |
| Premium Superfast | TATA | 11.250 m | 49 + D (3x2 layout) | 6 Cylinder Front Diesel Engine, 180 HP | Front Weveller and Rear Air Suspension | Automobile Corporation of Goa Ltd. (ACGL) |
| AC Seater | Ashok Leyland | 13.5 m | 50 Seat (2x2 layout) | 4 Cylinder Front Diesel Engine, 250 HP | Front & Rear Air Suspension | SM Kannappa Automobiles Pvt Ltd, Bangalore (PRAKASH) |
| AC Seater–Cum–Sleeper | Ashok Leyland | 13.5 m | 18 Berth, 36 Seat (2x1 layout) | 4 Cylinder Front Diesel Engine, 250 HP | Front & Rear Air Suspension | SM Kannappa Automobiles Pvt Ltd, Bangalore (PRAKASH) |
| AC Sleeper | Ashok Leyland | 13.5 m | 36 berth (2x1 layout) | 4 Cylinder Front Diesel Engine, 250 HP | Front & Rear Air Suspension | SM Kannappa Automobiles Pvt Ltd, Bangalore (PRAKASH) |
| AC Seater Multi axle | VE Commercial Vehicles | 15 m | 51 + 1+1 (2x2 layout), Reclining seat with calf support | 6 Cylinder Rear Diesel Engine, 360 HP | Front and Rear Air Suspension with electronic control | Volvo Buses India, Bangalore |
| AC Sleeper Multi axle | VE Commercial Vehicles | 15 m | 42 berth (2x1 layout) | 6 Cylinder Rear Diesel Engine, 360 HP | Front and Rear Air Suspension with electronic control | Volvo Buses India, Bangalore |

== Services ==
=== Long Distance Services ===
Gajaraj

Introduced in 2022, Gajaraj is KSRTC SWIFT's flagship service and is operated using eight Volvo 9400 B11R 15M AC sleeper buses. These buses are operated on routes between Kerala and Bengaluru.

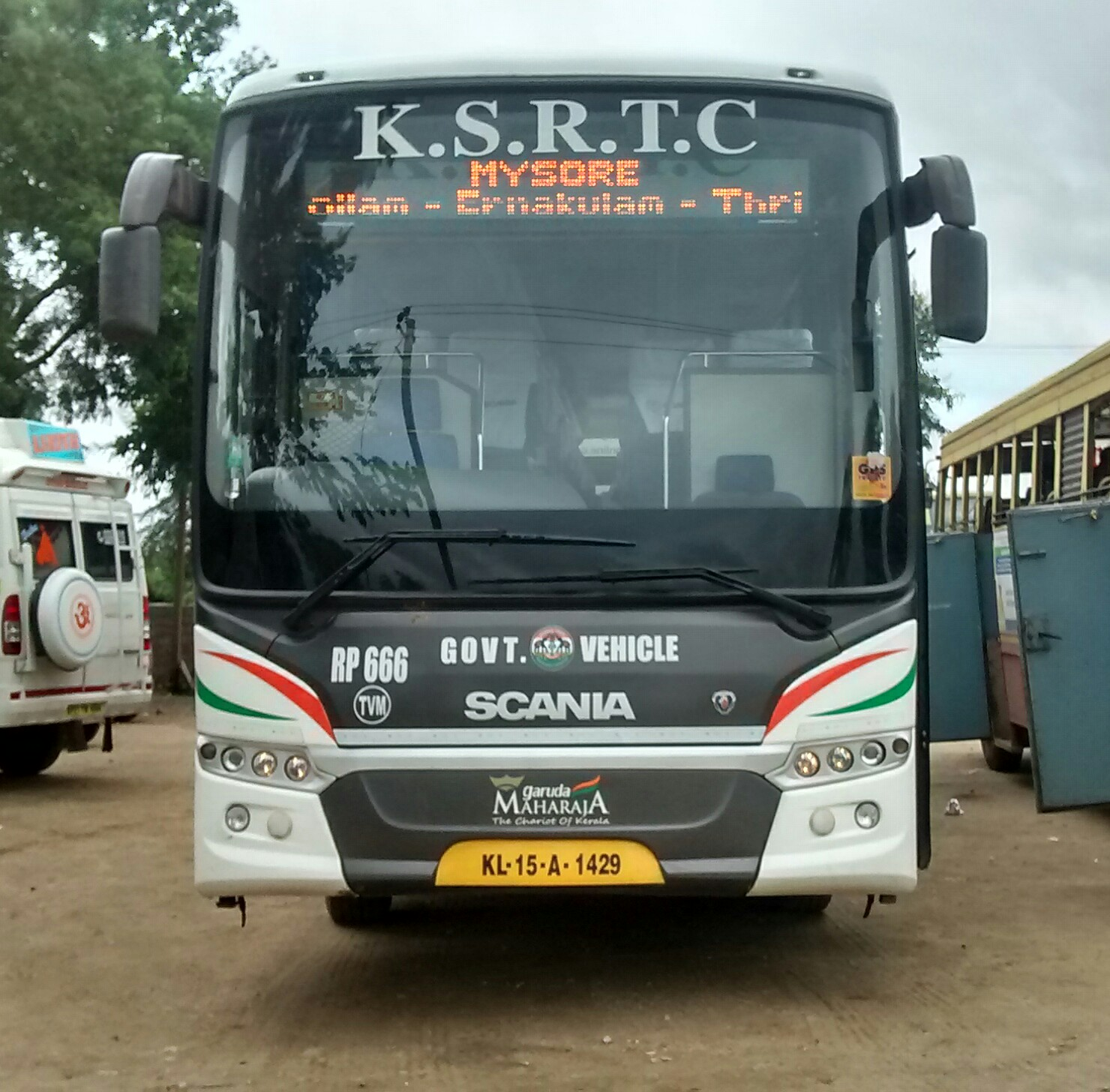
Garuda Maharaja service, operated with Scania Metrolink HD buses

Garuda Maharaja

Introduced in 2016, the Garuda Maharaja service uses Scania Metrolink HD 13.7-metre (45 ft) coaches. The buses have reclining seats with footrests and calf support, and radio and television in the front and centre. Water bottles and blankets are optional. Garuda Maharaja service is available on long-distance interstate routes.

Garuda King Class

This is a premium service, introduced in 2014, on air-conditioned Euro III Volvo 9400 XL B9R multi-axle buses with amenities similar to Garuda Maharaja.

Garuda A/C Seater

Introduced in 2022, these are premium air-conditioned interstate services operated by KSRTC Swift. BS6 Ashok Leyland semi-sleeper buses with bodies built by Prakash are used for this service.

Minnal

Minnal is a long-distance, limited-stop deluxe high speed night buses which use bypass roads to avoid traffic and save time. It is one of the most popular services among the KSRTC fan groups. The 41-seat, red-and-white buses (with lightning bolts) have 2+2 reclining seats and rear-axle air suspension. The service was introduced in June 2017, under managing director M. G. Rajamanikyam. Its color scheme was chosen to enhance nighttime visibility. The buses are built in-house on Ashok Leyland 160 hp Viking 222’’ (ALPSV 4/186) BS III and Tata LPO 1512c EX/58 BS III air suspension chassis.

Super Deluxe Air Bus

Super Deluxe Air Buses are non-air conditioned, white buses with streaks of tri-color on the sides can charge mobile phones and laptops, and have rear-axle air suspension. They are built on Ashok Leyland and Tata chassis. All passengers are guaranteed a seat. The KSRTC's oldest deluxe service operates between Kannur and Thiruvananthapuram. Started in 1967, it was part of the 1969 film Kannur Deluxe (the service's nickname). Large parts of the film were shot inside a bus.

Newer Deluxe buses, called Swift Deluxe Air Bus, are operated by KSRTC Swift and feature an orange livery.

Sabari Air Bus

Sabari Air Bus was introduced in 2016 as a service for Sabarimala pilgrims. The buses have a forest-themed livery to increase awareness of the environmentally-sensitive Periyar National Park. The buses (with facilities and fares similar to deluxe buses) also run throughout Kerala and interstate, and are built on Ashok Leyland BS III Viking 160 hp (ALPSV 4/186) and Tata LPO 1512c EX/58 BS III air-suspension chassis.

Super Express Air Bus

Super Express Air Buses have green-and-yellow colour scheme, with inspiration from Chundan Vallam. It have deluxe features at a lower fare. Super Express buses have more stops than deluxe buses, and standees are permitted. The fleet includes buses built in-house on Ashok Leyland 160 hp Viking 222 BS III (ALPSV 4/186) and Tata LPO 1512c EX/58 BS III air-suspension chassis.

A/C Premium Super Fast

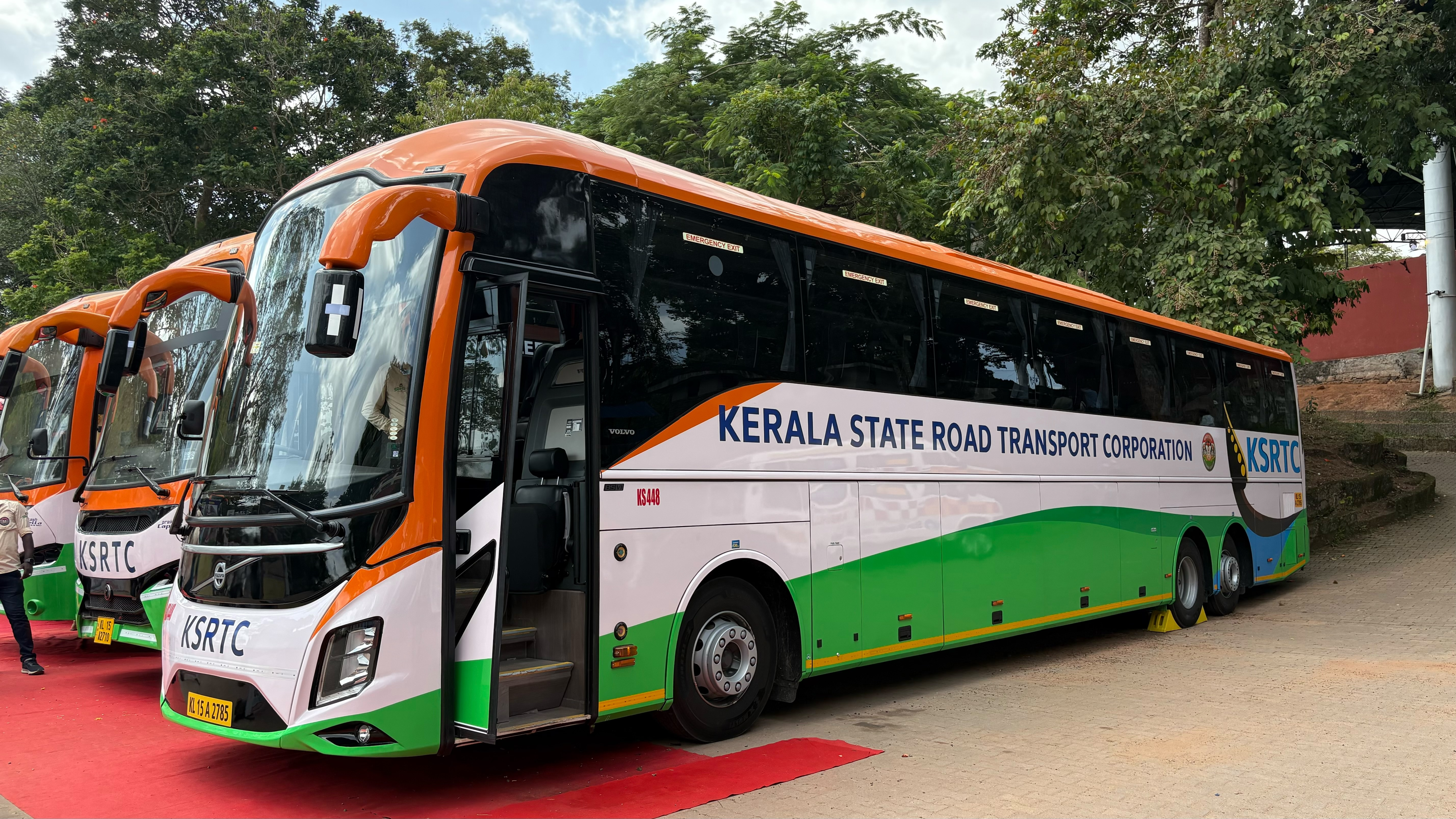
New Volvo 9600 seater bus of KSRTC

Introduced in 2024, this service is operated using 40 seat Tata Marcopolo A/C buses.

Super Fast Passenger (SFP)

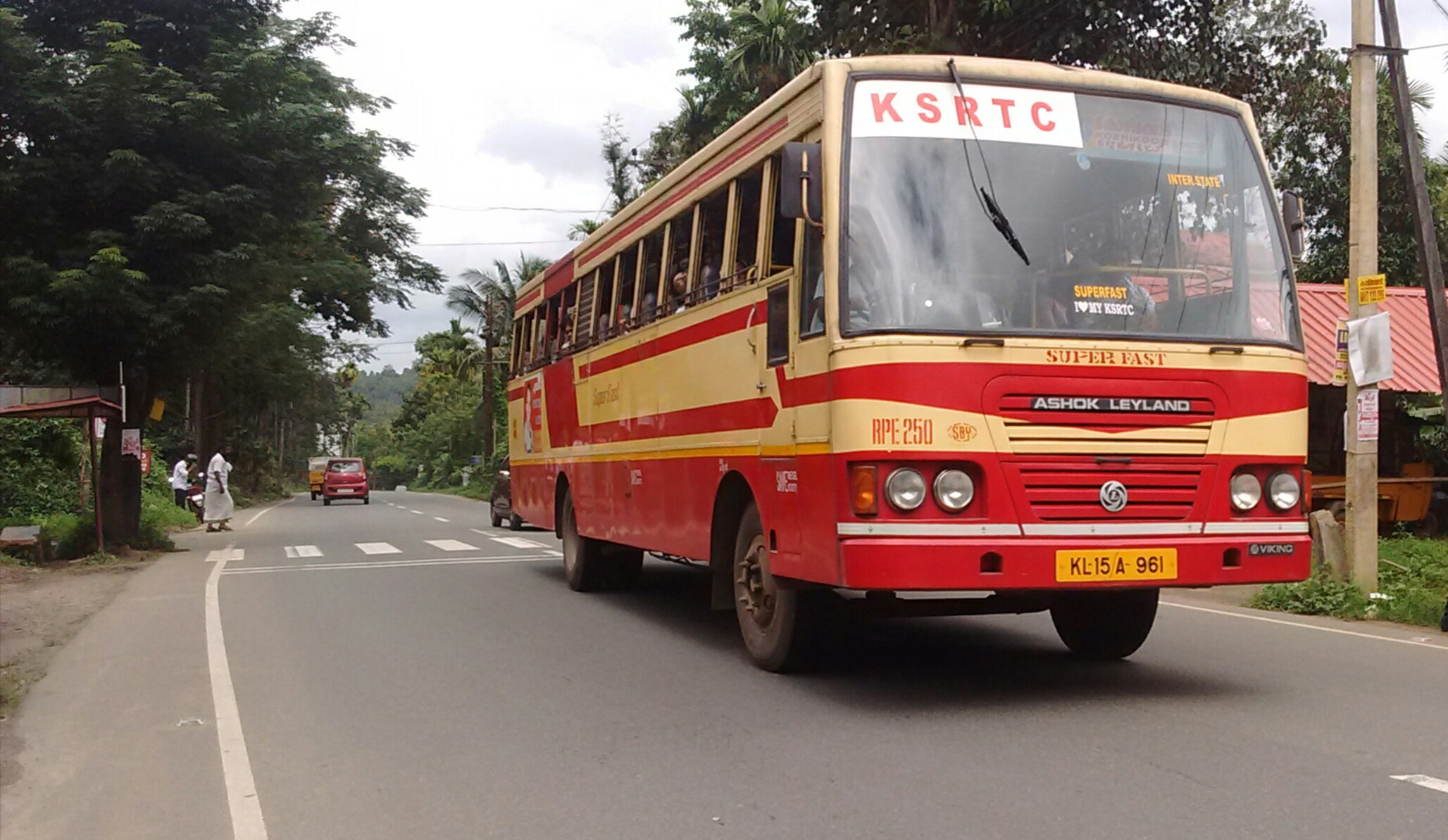
SFP bus, built by the Edappal Regional Workshop, running towards Kozhikode

Super Fast services are non-air-conditioned buses with a 3+2 seat configuration which operate on long, intercity routes. Super Fast buses, with fewer stops than Fast Passenger buses but more than Super Express, are built on Ashok Leyland, Tata and Eicher chassis. The service began in early 1992 as an improvement of the Fast Passenger service.

Limited Stop Super Fast services

This service do not enter all depots along their routes, unlike regular Super Fast services. These services were modeled after the successful Bypass Rider services, designed to offer faster travel by limiting number of stops.

In April 2025, a Super Fast bus, KS376, was retrofitted with an air-conditioning system on an experimental basis.

Fast Passenger

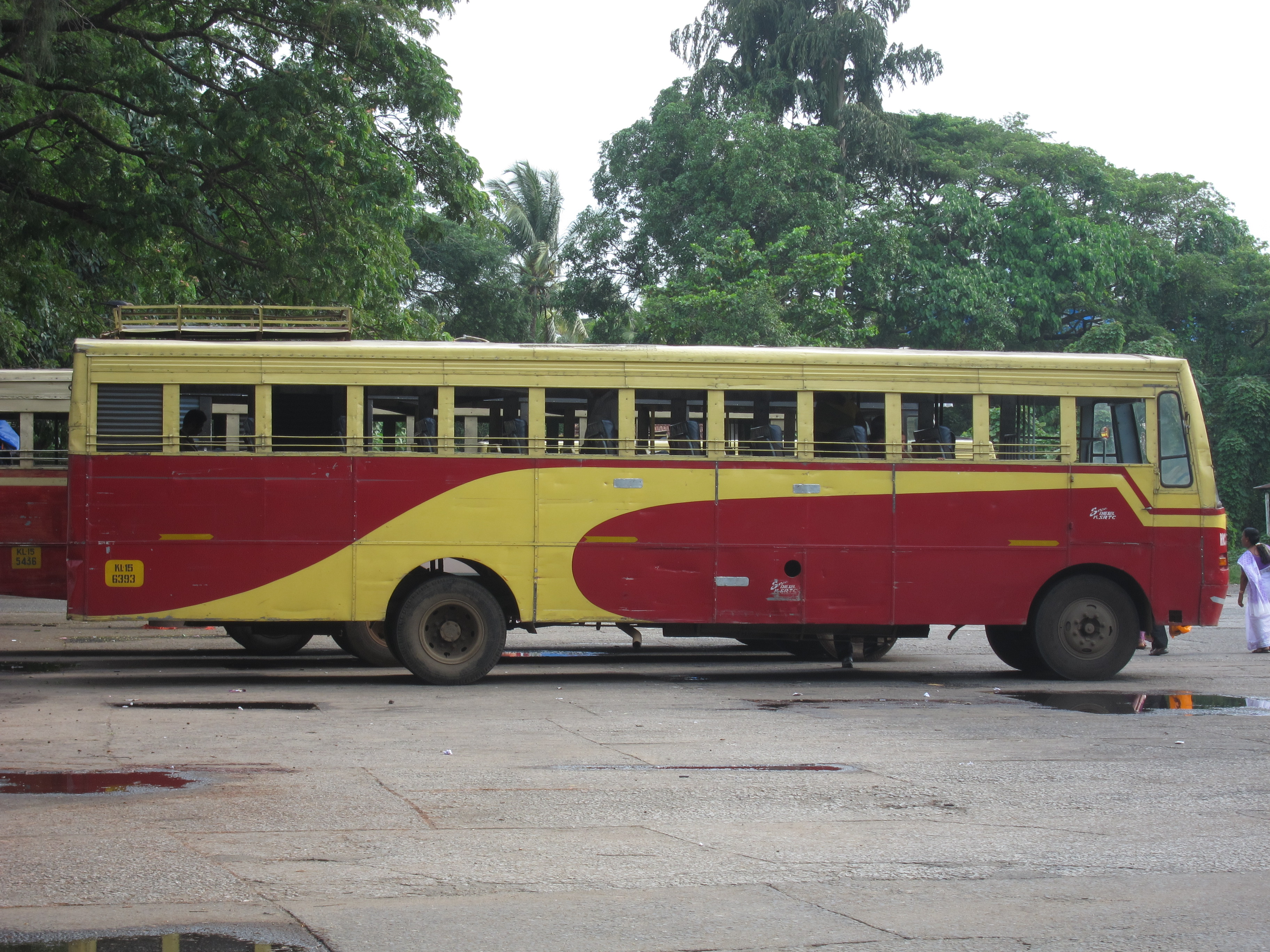
Fast Passenger bus

Fast Passenger service is a Non-air-conditioned, 3+2 service on intercity routes. FP routes have fewer stops than ordinary service. The buses are built on Tata, Ashok Leyland and Eicher chassis.

Limited Stop Fast Passenger (LSFP) They are Fast Passenger services which stop only at Super Fast stops.

=== Short Distance Services ===
Rajadhani Point-to-Point

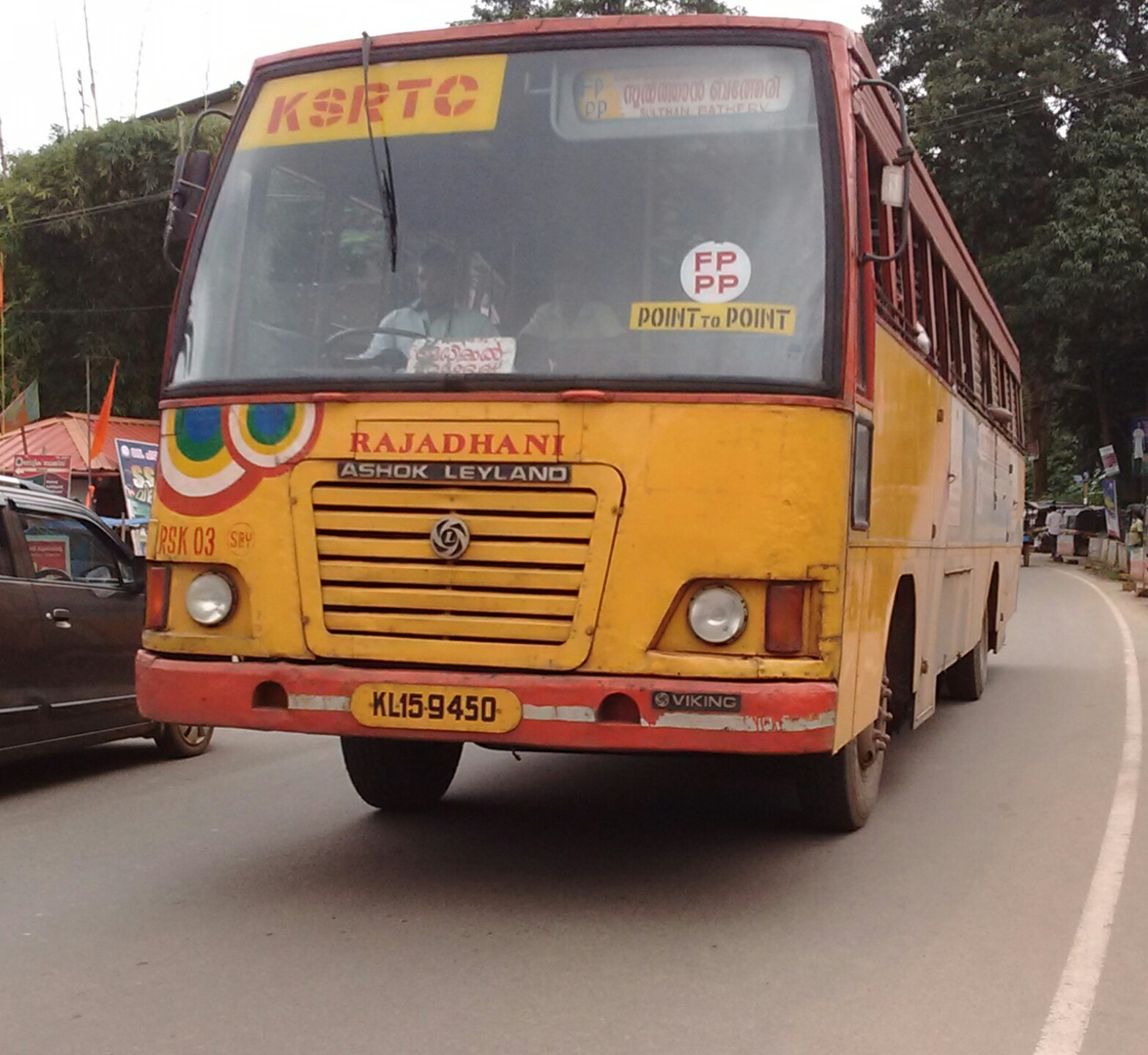
Rajadhani bus

Nonstop FP service in Thiruvananthapuram, Palakkad Kozhikode and Wayanad districts. Introduced in Thiruvananthapuram district as ring road service in 2012, it was introduced in the Malabar region (connecting Calicut to Wayanad and Palakkad districts) the following year.

Ordinary

KSRTC's most basic service. They have 3+2 or 2+2 seats. Older Super Class buses are usually converted and used for ordinary service.

Town-to-Town (TT)

TT service, charging ordinary fares with fewer stops, was introduced during the mid-1990s.

Limited Stop Ordinary

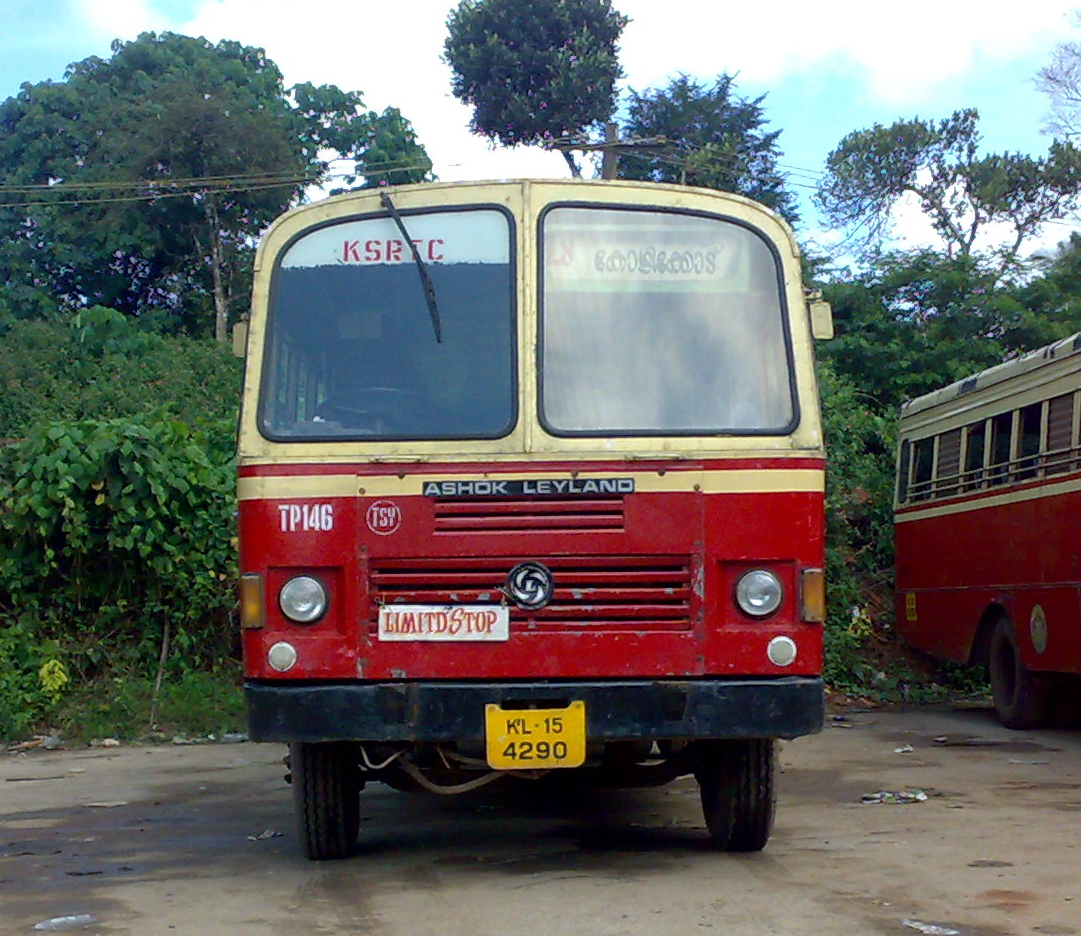
An old ordinary service bus

Ordinary buses with fewer stops, introduced during the mid-1990s.

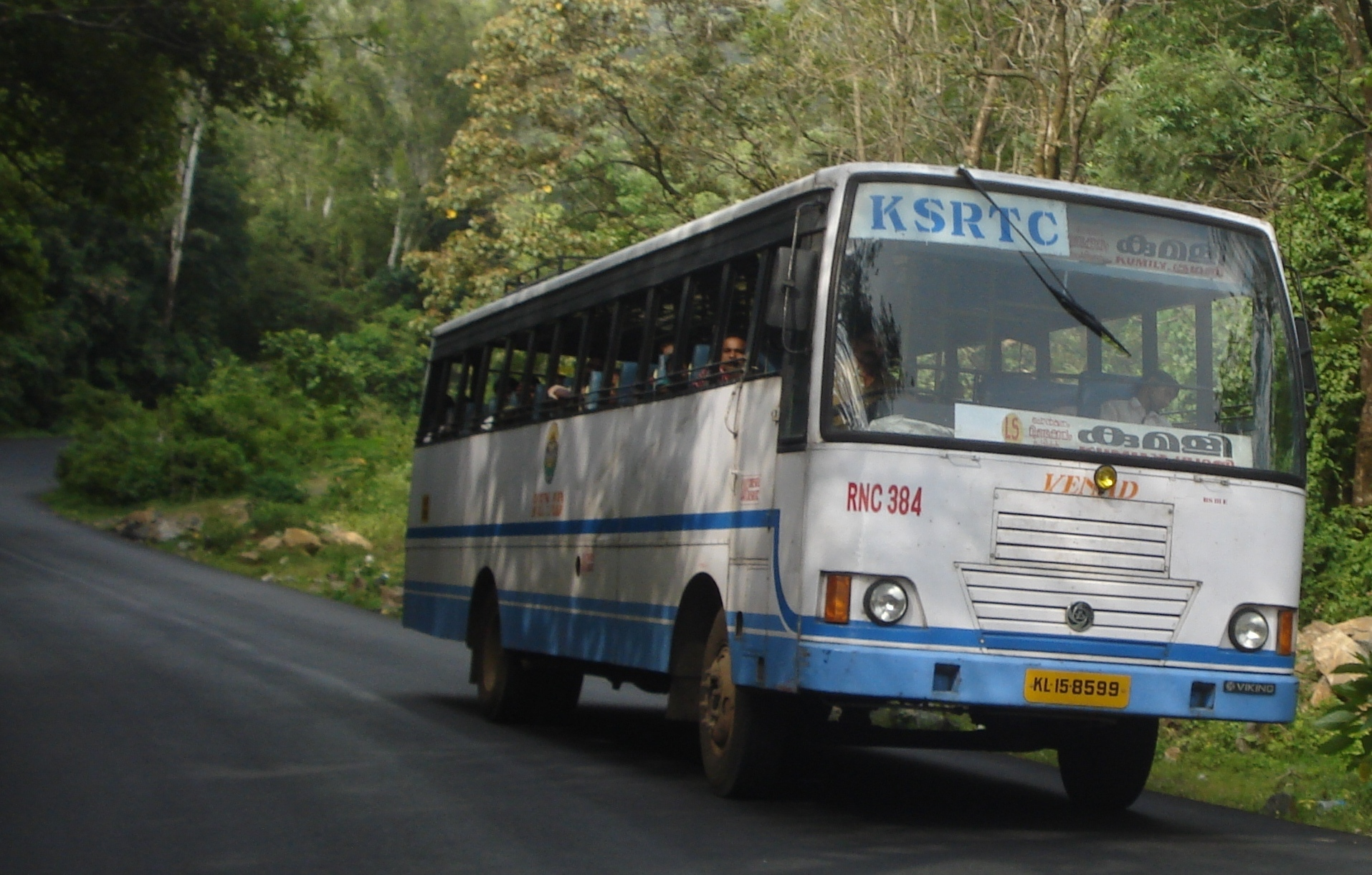
Venad bus, built on an Ashok Leyland chassis, heading towards Kumily

AC Low Floor Bus

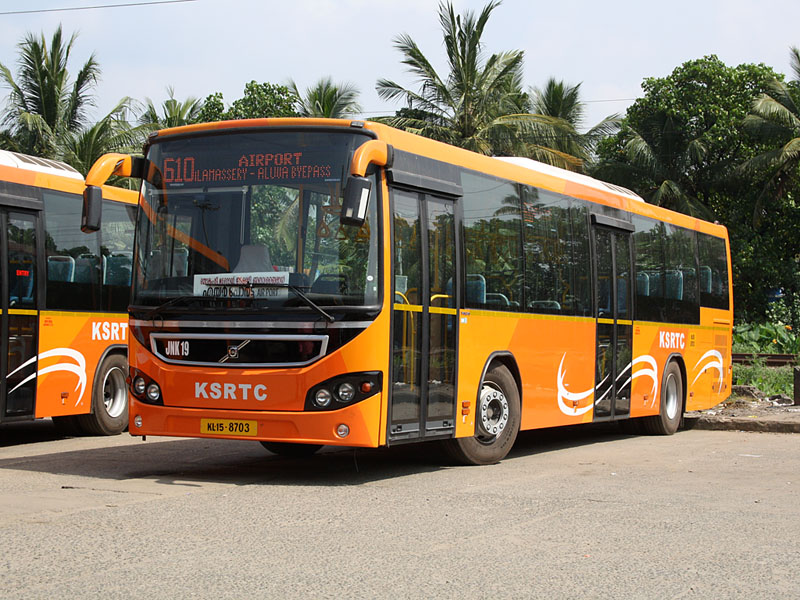
Volvo 8400 BS IV bus at Kochi

KSRTC operates air-conditioned, low-floor buses on city and intercity routes. These Volvo 8400 B7RLE buses were acquired under the Jawaharlal Nehru National Urban Renewal Mission (JNNURM).

Non-AC Low-Floor/Semi-Low-Floor Bus

KSRTC operates non-air-conditioned buses (purchased under the JNNURM Phase 2) on short routes. The low-floor Ashok Leyland RESLF BS III, Ashok Leyland 225 hp 12M FESLF and Tata Starbus Urban 9/12 BS III built on 1618 SLF by Marcopolo and ACGL buses stop at all Fast Passenger stops.

Anantapuri/Thiru Kochi/Malabar/Venad

Blue-and-white City Fast buses in Thiruvananthapuram, Ernakulam, Kollam and the Malabar region. These are limited-stop ordinary/ordinary services. These buses have two doors, a one-piece windshield, an all-steel body, a seating capacity of 53, and a low footboard. The bodies were built in-house.

=== Double-Decker Services ===
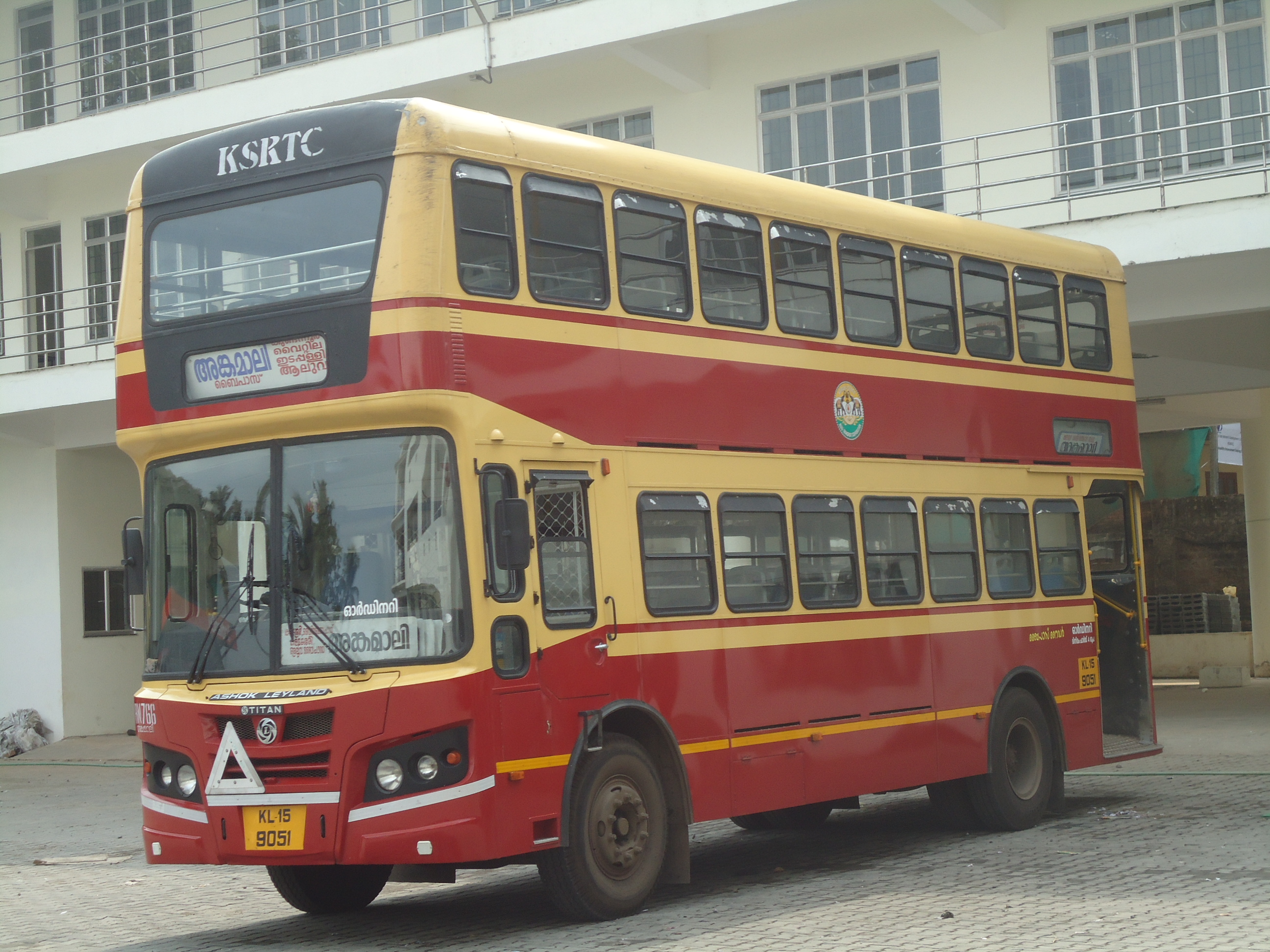
Double-decker bus at the Angamaly bus station

KSRTC operates two Ashok Leyland Titan (BS III 123 kW) double-decker buses with bonnet numbers RN766 and RN765. These buses are being used for "Royal View" sightseeing service in Munnar.

Apart from these, KSRTC also operates four open top Switch EiV22 City electric double decker buses on its city tour service, two in Thiruvananthapuram, and one each in Thrissur and Kozhikode.

Travancore State Transport Department superintendent E. G. Salter imported double-decker buses in 1937. KSRTC also used one of the original AEC Routemasters in Kochi on a route from Palarivattom to Willingdon Island from the 1960s to the late 1970s. A court, faced with non-payment by the KSRTC, ordered the seizure of the Kochi double-decker until the debt was paid.

Thiruvananthapuram originally had 15 British Leyland double-decker buses, serially numbered from DD1 to DD15, with bodies built at KSRTC Central Workshop in Thiruvananthapuram. The buses had a semi-automatic transmission, with no clutch. The last five buses were moved to Eranakulam district. KSRTC launched two double-decker buses (serial numbers TR555 and TR666) during the 1990s.

=== City Services ===
Thiruvananthapuram City Circular

Launched in 2021, the Thiruvananthapuram City Circular is a bus service operated by KSRTC in Thiruvananthapuram. The service operates on circular routes covering all the major parts of the city. The buses ply every 15 minutes during peak hours and every 30 minutes during off-peak hours. The fare is INR 10 per trip and INR 30 for a whole day trip. Initially, the service was operated using old JNNURM Ashok Leyland and Tata low-floor buses. Later, electric PMI Regio and Eicher Skyline Pro E buses were also introduced.

Thiruvananthapuram City Shuttle

Launched in 2022, as a service for commuters from the peripheral centers of the city to the center. The city shuttle service run round the clock from 7am to 7pm. It is integrated with the circular services, to help commuters travel to other parts of the city. City Shuttle Routes are between Thampanoor to Neyyatinkara, Nemom, Pallichal, Pravachambalam. Plans exist for new routes from the city to Mudavanmugal, Malayinkeezhu, Karakulam, Vattappara, Kazhakuttam, Sreekaryam, Kaniyapuram, Pothencode, Akkulam, Anayara, Veli, Kulathoor, Kovalam and Poovar

=== Other Services ===
Sandeshavahini

Super Fast buses with water-conservation messages (sandeshavahini means "messenger" in Malayalam), pamphlets, posters, and other publicity materials for distribution KSRTC introduced the service in March 2017 with 15 buses, one for each district (except Thiruvananthapuram, which has two). The bus bodies were fabricated at KSRTC's Edappal regional workshop on Eicher 20.15 N LPO BS III and Ashok Leyland BS III 160 hp Viking 222 (ALPSV 4/186) chassis.

LNG buses

KSRTC launched its first LNG bus service on 21 June 2021 in order to reduce the operational losses and to promote an energy source considered to be far less damaging to the environment.

=== Discontinued services ===
Terraplane
KSRTC's flagship luxury service during the 1970s operated nonstop between Thiruvananthapuram and Kochi. Introduced by transport minister R. Balakrishna Pillai, buses had onboard toilets and a reservation system. Two Ashok Leyland buses with bonnet numbers A555, A666 and a super-deluxe bus (numbered 4000) were used for the service, which was discontinued due to a high accident rate.
Lightning Express
Long distance, limited-stop service during the 1990s. The silver buses were later converted to Volvos.
White Express
Red-and-white buses which operated during the 1990s
Silver Line Jet
Introduced in 2015 as a successor to the Lighting Express, the limited-stop intrastate service had reclining seats, a CCTV camera, Wi-Fi, and charging facilities for laptops and mobile phones. It was discontinued due to low ridership, reportedlu caused by lack of air suspension and high fares. The 41-seat buses were fabricated in-house on Ashok Leyland BS III 160 hp Viking 222" (ALPSV 4/186) and Eicher 20.15 N LPO BS III chassis.
Pink Bus
KSRTC launched the women-only city fast service in Thiruvananthapuram district in 2017. The buses had women conductors. Two old Ashok Leyland 160 hp Viking BS III 222" (ALPSV 4/186) pink super-fast buses were used for the service. However, the buses failed to attract passengers.
Minibus
KSRTC's minibus service, introduced in 2003, was the first of its kind in India. With a capacity of 25 to 30 seats, the buses were ideal for some routes and stopped at passenger request. The service was discontinued due to bus-durability concerns.
Ananthapuri Air Bus
Introduced in 2005 in Thiruvananthapuram, the service was a predecessor of low-floor buses. With two doors and a long body, the buses could carry almost twice as many passengers as other buses. Intended for tourists, the semi-low floor (635mm), rear engine, non-air-conditioned bus by Ashok Leyland Panther chassis (ALPS 3/22) had a body built by Irizar – TVS. With H-series turbocharged engines conforming to BS-II emission standards the 42 seater buses also had front and rear air suspension. KSRTC had a total 4 of them with serial numbers RT599, RT600, RT601, and RT602. These buses had dark blue lines on white background paintjob.
Garuda Sanchari
KSRTC operated bi-axle Volvo buses in its Garuda Sanchari service (sanchari means "passenger" in Malayalam). The service was introduced by K. B. Ganesh Kumar in 2002. The first vehicles, two Volvo Euro III B7R Mark1 (TP620 and TP621) were the first Volvo buses introduced by a road transport corporation in India. One bus operated on the Thiruvananthapuram –Palakkad route and the other operated on the Thiruvananthapuram-Kozhikkode route until 2008. In 2008, KSRTC acquired three Volvo 9400 B7R Mark III buses.
AC Air Deluxe

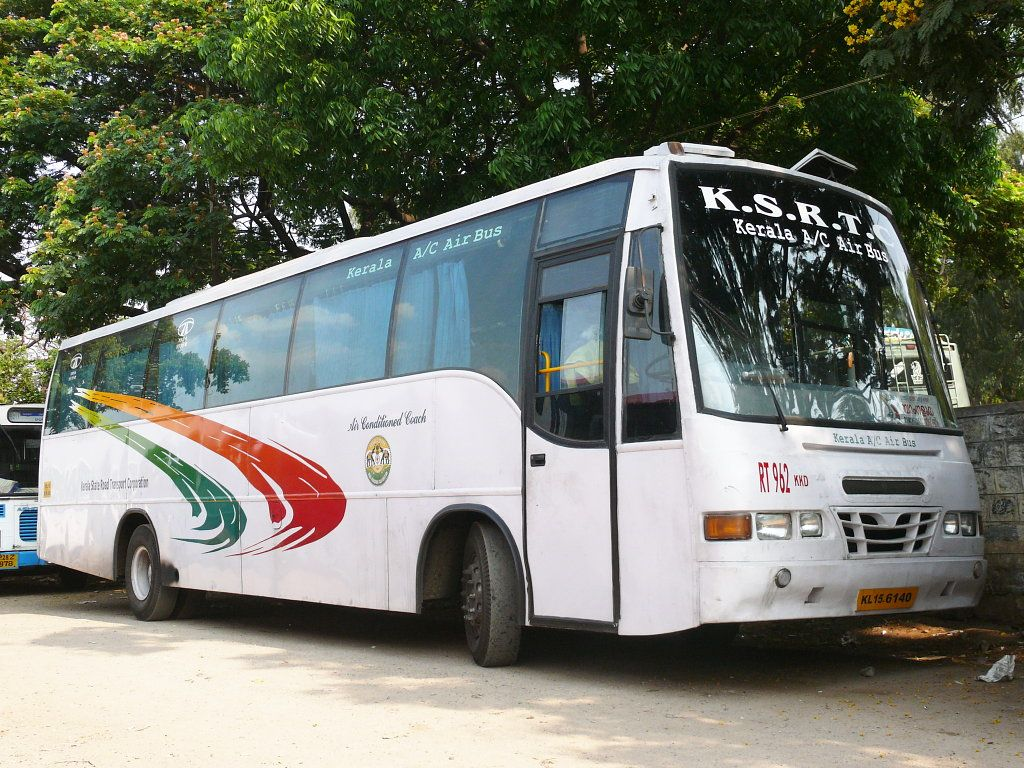
RT962, a Tata AC Air Bus owned by KSRTC

A short-lived air-conditioned service was launched in 2005 after the first Volvo buses. There were 10 buses: five Tata (built by Popular) and five Ashok Leyland, built by Irizar TVS. The Tata buses were built on LPO 1616/62 BS-II chassis with engine-driven (direct-drive) air-conditioning, and the AL chassis were 177 hp 12M BS-II (ALPSV 4/86) with air-conditioning driven by a slave engine.

At the end of 2007, KSRTC added 20 Tata Globus 45 buses to its fleet. The buses with tri-colour streaks on a white background, had reclining seats and recharging facilities for mobile phones.

Articulated buses

KSRTC owned an Ashok Leyland Vestibule (BS III 123 kW) bus, which operated in Thiruvananthapuram district and Kollam district. Passengers paid ordinary fares. This bus was gutted in a fire.

Trailer buses had Ashok Leyland tractor units and Allwyn trailers.

== Subsidiaries ==
=== Kerala Urban Road Transport Corporation ===
In November 2014, Kerala Urban Road Transport Corporation (KURTC) was formed to operate low-floor buses procured with financial assistance from the Jawaharlal Nehru National Urban Renewal Mission (JNNURM).

=== KSRTC SWIFT ===
KSRTC SWIFT (K-SWIFT) is a company formed on 9 November 2021 by KSRTC with an aim to overcome the financial crisis faced by the corporation. K-SWIFT function independently within the KSRTC and operates the long-distance buses of the corporation.

== Zones ==
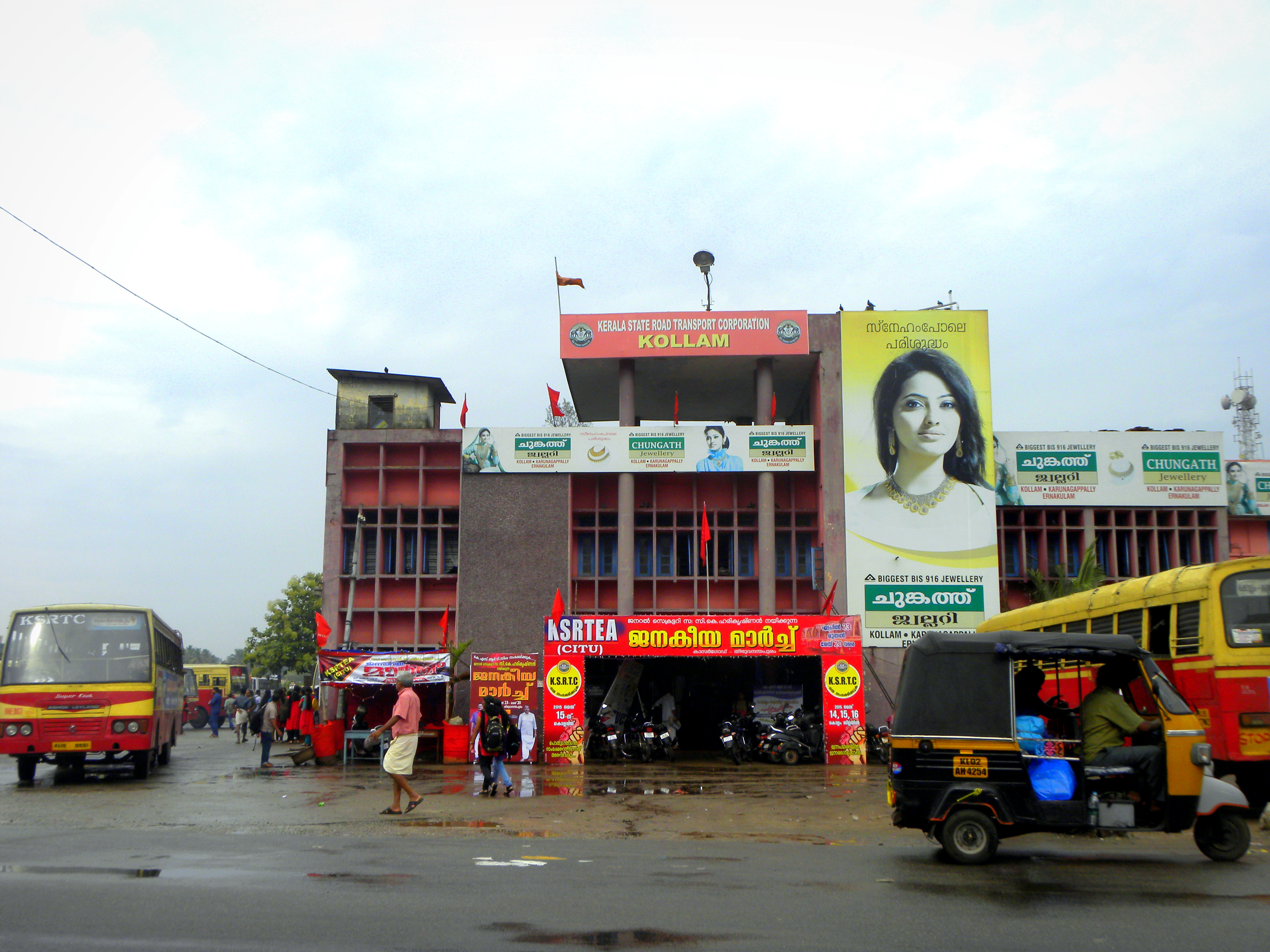
KSRTC Bus Station in Kollam

There were 5 KSRTC zones until 2018: Thiruvananthapuram, Kollam, Kochi, Thrissur and Kozhikode. But was reduced to three in 2018.

| Name | Districts | Headquarters |
|---|---|---|
| South | Thiruvananthapuram, Kollam, Pathanamthitta | Thiruvananthapuram |
| Central | Alappuzha, Kottayam, Idukki, Ernakulam, Thrissur | Kochi |
| North | Palakkad, Malappuram, Kozhikode, Wayanad, Kannur, Kasargod | Kozhikode |

The Thiruvananthapuram (south) zone, which includes three districts, has more buses. The north zone (which includes six districts) has 945 buses, mostly long-distance.

== Depots, stations and workshops ==
KSRTC has 28 depots, 45 sub-depots, 19 operating centres, 28 stationmaster offices, five workshops and three staff-training colleges throughout the state. In 1995, the corporation established the Sree Chitra Thirunal College of Engineering in Pappanamcode at its central workshop.

KSRTC has 28 station master (SM) offices in Ambalapuzha, Ayoor, Eenchakkal, Ernakulam Jetty, Ettumanoor, Iritty, Kadakkal, Kaliyakkavila, Kuthiyathode, Malayilkeezh, Mundakkayam, Nagarcoil, Ochira, Pattambi, Pothencode, Puthenkurishu, Tirur, Valanchery, Varkala, Vytila Hub, and staff-training colleges in Trivandrum, Ernakulam and Edappal.

== Bus stations ==
For KSRTC bus stations with a Wikipedia article, see Bus stations of Kerala State Road Transport Corporation

== Fares ==
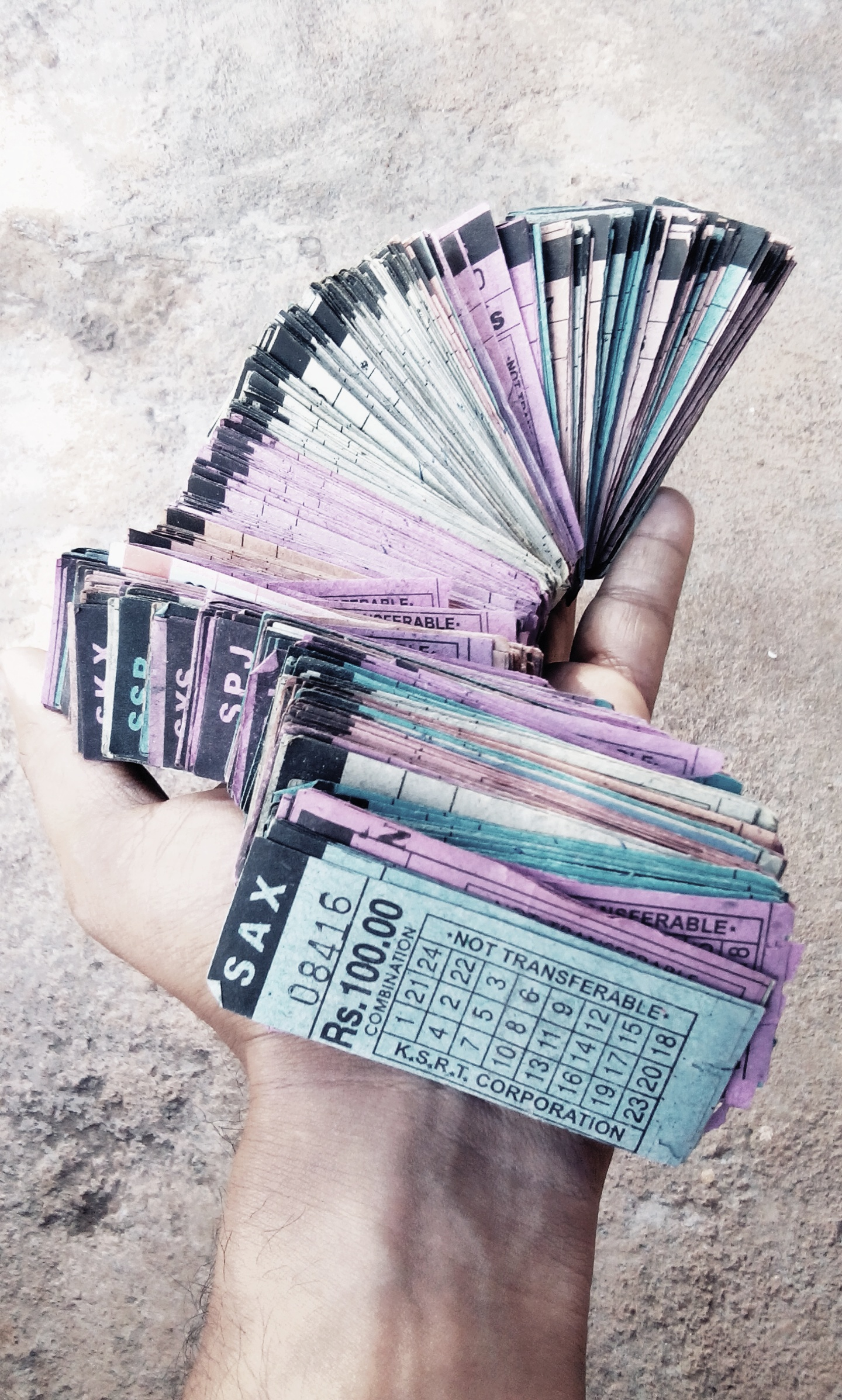
Stack of traditional old bus tickets. Today, electronic ticketing machines are used.

KSRTC uses a fare-stage system to calculate fares.

Fare table
| Service class | Minimum fare | Rate per km for travel above minimum fare |
|---|---|---|
| City/Ordinary | ₹10 | 100 paise |
| City Fast | ₹12 | 103 paise |
| Fast Passenger/LSFP | ₹15 | 105 paise |
| Super Fast Passenger | ₹22 | 108 paise |
| Super Express | ₹28 | 110 paise |
| Super Deluxe | ₹40 | 120 paise |
| Luxury/Hi-tech and AC | ₹60 | 150 paise |
| Garuda Sanchari/Biaxle Premium | ₹60 | 181 paise |
| Garuda Maharaja/ Garuda King Class/ Multi-axle Premium | ₹100 | 225 paise |
| A/C Low Floor | ₹26 | 175 paise |
| Non A/C Low Floor | ₹10 | 100 paise |

24 Hour Passenger support system is available and the Contact number for the same is 0471 - 2463799 or 9447071021. Passengers can also submit the suggestions and complaints through the official face book page of KSRTC.

== Initiatives ==
Priyadarshini Scheme

Priyadarshini is a welfare scheme of the Government of Kerala that provides free travel for women and transgender persons on ordinary services operated by the Kerala State Road Transport Corporation (KSRTC).

In June 2026, KSRTC began implementing the Priyadarshini scheme, which provides free travel for women and transgender persons on ordinary bus services across Kerala. The scheme was introduced on 15 June 2026 under the state's Indira Guarantee programme. It offers free travel for women and transgender persons on ordinary KSRTC services, with the Government of Kerala compensating KSRTC for the resulting loss of fare revenue.

Initially, the benefit is available on ordinary KSRTC services, including Ordinary, City Ordinary, Limited Stop Ordinary, Town-to-Town, Fair Stage Limited Stop Ordinary, Point-to-Point Ordinary, and Grama Vandi services.

== Cultural impact and in media ==
KSRTC buses have a wide fan following across the entire state of Kerala. Fondly called as Aanavandi, it has close to 100 dedicated fan pages on Instagram. Many people see KSRTC buses as a callback to their childhood nostalgia, while some others enjoy frequently travelling in these buses. There have even been incidents where passengers requested the authority to bring back their favourite buses, which were taken to other depots from their existing depots or even requested to stop transferring their favorite routes to KSRTC Swift for operation like the prestigious Changanassery–Velankanni Super Express

KSRTC buses have been featured in many Malayalam movies. The 2012 film Ordinary's main plot revolves around some incidents happening in a KSRTC bus. Since then, film fraternity started associating KSRTC buses to the culture of Keralites. There is a famous quote from the movie Jacobinte Swargarajyam about KSRTC buses where the hero states that "Every Malayali (Keralite) has to travel in a KSRTC bus to be qualified as a Malayali". The 2021 movie Yuvam is completely based on KSRTC. It shows the journey of three young advocates, who tries to save KSRTC from getting privatised due to debts which happened due the inlawful actions by some politicians.

"The history of KSRTC in Kerala is intertwined with the lives of the people. It's not just a vehicle service. This public transport system has left its mark on our cultural life, including in cinema and literature and it cannot be erased so quickly"; said the then transport minister Antony Raju following the legal battle Kerala won over Karnataka to use the brand KSRTC. Kerala has won the trademark battle against Karnataka. The acronym KSRTC, which was being used by the Kerala State Road Transport Corporation and the Karnataka State Road Transport Corporation, will now be used only in Kerala.

== See also ==
- Kerala Urban Road Transport Corporation
- KSRTC SWIFT
