= Tata 1510/1512 =

Indian single-deck bus chassis manufactured by Tata Motors

Tata 1510 / 1512
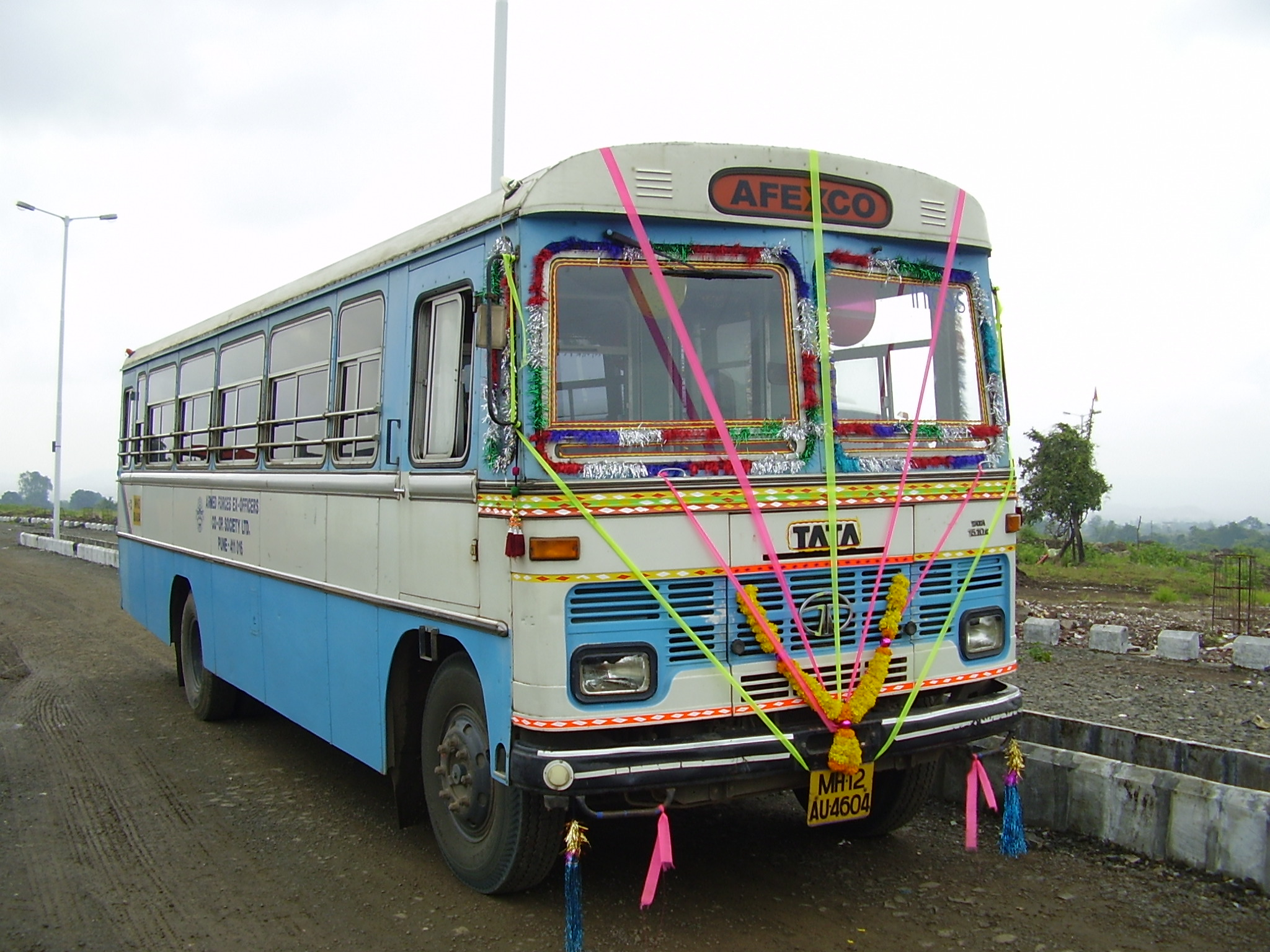
- A Tata 1510C of Infosys decorated for Dussehra Festival, Pune, India

Overview
- Manufacturer: Tata Motors
- Production: 1980s–present
- Assembly: Pune, Lucknow, Jamshedpur, Haldwani, India

Body and chassis
- Class: Single-deck bus chassis
- Body style: Front-engine, ladder frame
- Related: Tata LP Series, Tata Starbus

Powertrain
- Engine: Tata 697 diesel / Tata Cummins 6BT 5.9L turbocharged diesel
- Capacity: Up to 60 passengers (depending on configuration)
- Transmission: 5 or 6-speed manual

The Tata 1510 and Tata 1512 are single-deck bus chassis models produced by Tata Motors, one of India’s largest commercial vehicle manufacturers. Widely seen across India and neighbouring countries, they have served as the backbone of regional and city bus fleets since the 1980s.

These models are known for their strong ladder-frame chassis, simple mechanical design, and low operating cost. The 1510 and 1512 designations generally indicate a 10–12 tonne gross vehicle weight (GVW) range.

== Overview ==
The Tata 1510 series originally used Tata’s in-house 697 diesel engine, derived from earlier Mercedes-Benz licensed designs. Later models such as the Tata 1512 and 1512C adopted the Tata Cummins 6BT 5.9L turbocharged diesel engine, providing higher power and improved emissions compliance.

Typical configurations include:

- Transmission: 5- or 6-speed manual gearbox
- Steering: Hydraulic power-assisted steering
- Brakes: Full air, dual circuit, S-cam type
- Suspension: Semi-elliptical leaf springs with telescopic shock absorbers

The chassis is supplied by Tata Motors to contracted bodybuilders who construct custom bus bodies depending on operator requirements — from urban stage carriage buses to intercity coaches and school transport vehicles.

== Variants ==
- Tata LP 1510 – Early-generation 10-ton chassis with Tata 697 engine
- Tata LP 1512 – 12-ton variant with Cummins 6BT engine
- Tata LPO 1512 / Starbus Urban – Updated versions meeting Bharat Stage VI (BS6) norms for city and intercity operations

== Usage ==
Tata 1510/1512 buses are operated by many state transport undertakings including:

- MSRTC
- KSRTC
- TNSTC
- APSRTC, BEST, and others

They are also widely used by private fleet operators and educational institutions. Export versions have been deployed in Sri Lanka, Bangladesh, Nepal, and parts of Africa.

== See also ==
- Tata Starbus
- Tata Marcopolo
- Ashok Leyland Viking
- List of buses
