= Thiruvananthapuram City Circular =

KSRTC City Circular Thiruvananthapuram

Overview
- Locale: Thiruvananthapuram, Kerala, India
- Transit type: Circular Bus Transit
- Number of lines: 13
- Number of stations: 1,000
- Daily ridership: 80,000

Operation
- Operator: Kerala State Road Transport Corporation
- Number of vehicles: 1000
- Headway: 15 minutes (peak hour); 30 minutes (off-peak hours)

The Thiruvananthapuram City Circular is a bus service operated by the Kerala State Road Transport Corporation (KSRTC) in Thiruvananthapuram, the capital of Kerala, India. The service was launched with a fleet of 64 buses in November, 2021 operating on seven route connecting major parts of the city. The service currently operates on 13 circular routes, with over 1000 stops and 24 interchange points (route intersection stops) serviced by a fleet of 132 buses, including electric buses. The buses operate every 15 minutes during peak hours and 30 minutes during off-peak hours. The fare for a journey ranges from INR 10 to 30. The service is the first public transportation system in Kerala with a 'hop on, hop off' model. A 'Good Day Ticket' offers unlimited travel in any city circular bus valid up to 24 hours. The Road Transport Corporation claims an average daily ridership of 80,000. Along with the services on circular routes, new Point-to-Point services have been introduced.

== Routes ==
Circular Service Routes
Route No.	Route name	Route details
1C/1A	Red Clockwise/Anti-Clockwise	East Fort - Overbridge - Thampanoor - Overbridge - Ayurveda College - Statue - Spencer - VJT - Kerala University - Palayam - Legislature - PMG - Vikas Bhavan Depot - PMG - LMS - Museum - Kanakakunnu - Manaveeyam Road - Police Headquarters - Vazhuthakkad - Police Training College - Mettukada - Thycaud Hospital - Fly Over - Thampanoor - Overbridge - East Fort.
2C/2A	Blue Clockwise/Anti-Clockwise	East Fort - Overbridge - Thampanoor - Overbridge - Ayurveda College - Uppitamudu Bridge - Vanchiyur Court - Pattur - General Hospital - Kerala University - Palayam - Legislature - PMG - LMS - Museum - Kanakakunnuu - Vellayambalam - Shastamangalam - Sri Ramakrishna Hospital - Marutankuzhi - Kochar Road - Edapachinji - Jagati - Vazhuthakad - Bakery Junction - Jacobs Junction - Cantonment Gate - Statue - Ayurveda College - Overbridge - Thampanoor - East Fort.
3C/3A	Magenta Clockwise/Anti-Clockwise	Peroorkada Depot - Peroorkada - Ambalamukk - Kowdiar - TTC - Vellayambalam - Museum - LMS - Palayam - Statue - Thampanoor - Aristo - Model School - Bakery (Underpass) - RBI - Palayam (Stadium) - Legislature - PMG - Plamoodu - Pattom - Kesavadasapuram - Pattom - Kuravankonam - Kowdiar - Ambalammukku - Peroorkada - Peroorkada Depot
4C/4A	Yellow Clockwise/Anti-Clockwise	Peroorkada Depot - Peroorkada - Ambalamukku - Kowdiar - TTC - Devaswom Board - Nanthancode - Museum - LMS - Palayam - VJT - Kerala University - Flyover - Legislature - PMG - Plamoodu - Pattom - Potakuzhi - Medical College - Ulloor - Kesavadasapuram - Paruthipara - Muttada - Vayalikada - Santwana Junction - Ambalamukku - Peroorkada - Peroorkada Depot
5C/5A	Violet Clockwise/Anti-Clockwise	Peroorkada Depot - Oolampara - HLL - Pipinmood - Edapazhanji - Cotton Hill School, Vazhuthacaud - Mettukada - Thycaud - Thampanoor - Ayurveda College - Statue - Palayam - Assembly - LMS - Museum - Vellayambalam - TTC - Kowdiar - Ambalamukku - Peroorkada - Peroorkada Depot
6C/6A	Brown Clockwise/Anti-Clockwise	East Fort - Overbridge - Thampanoor - Flyover - Chenthitta - Kannettumukku - Jagathy - Edapazhanji - Sasthamangalam - Sree Ramakrishna Hospital - Maruthamkuzhi - Forest Office (PTP Nagar) - PTP Nagar - Vettamukku - Ilipode - Valiyavila - Tirumala - Vijayamohini Mill - Poojappura - Kunchalumoodu - Karamana - Killipalam - Attakkulangara Road - East Fort.
7C/7A	Green Clockwise/Anti-Clockwise	East Fort - Transport Bhavan - Vazhappally - Fort Hospital - Uppidamoodu Bridge - Petta Pallimukku - Kannammoola - Kumarapuram - Medical College - Murinjapalam - Pottakuzhi - Theekumoodu - Anadyil Hospital - Law College Junction - Vikas Bhavan Depot - P. M. G. - L. M. S. - Palayam - Statue - Ayurveda College - Overbridge - Thampanoor - Overbridge - East Fort.
8C/8A	Air - Rail Clockwise/Anti-Clockwise	East Fort North Bus Stand - Thampanoor Railway Station - East Fort South Bus Stand - Manacaud - Valiyathura - Airport (Domestic) - Airport (International) - Chakka - Pettah - Pattur - Kerala University - Thampanoor Railway Station - East Fort
9C/9A	Orange Clockwise/Anti-Clockwise	East Fort- Thampanoor - Overbridge - Secretariat - Pattor - Chakai - Shangumugham - Airport - Valiyathura - Kallumoodu - Manacaud - East Fort
10C/10A	Indigo Clockwise/Anti-Clockwise	Thampanoor - East Fort South Bus Stand - Kalipankulam - Koncharivila Temple - Bound Road - Milma - Thiruvallam - Ambalathara - Kamaleswaram - Manacaud - East Fort North Bus Stand -Thampanoor
11C/11A	Gold Clockwise/Anti-Clockwise	Thampanoor - East Fort South Bus Stand - Manacaud - Kamaleswaram - Ambalathara - Poonthura - Beemapally - Valiyathura - Mukkolakkal - Manacaud - East Fort North Bus Stand -Thampanoor
12C/12A	Olive Clockwise/Anti-Clockwise	Thampanoor - East Fort South Bus Stand - Eenchakkal - Vallakadavu - Ponnara Bridge - Sulaiman Street - Domestic -Airport (International) - Chakka - Petta - Pattur - Kerala University -Thampanoor
13C/13A	Cyan Clockwise/Anti-Clockwise	Thampanoor - East Fort South Bus Stand - Kamaleswaram - Kallettumukku - Ambalathara - Manikkavilakam- Kallumoodu - Manacaud - East Fort North Bus Stand - Thampanoor
