= Kerala Urban Road Transport Corporation =

Indian Bus Company

- Parent: Kerala State Road Transport Corporation
- Founded: 2015
- Defunct: 2022
- Headquarters: Kochi
- Service area: Kerala
- Service type: Local, limited-stop, express, and BRT bus service
- Operator: Government of Kerala
- Website: https://kurtc.in/

The Kerala Urban Road Transport Corporation (KURTC) was a state-run bus company which started with more than 500 low-floor buses (A/C & NON A/C) in Kerala, India. KURTC used to run complete and individual services in Thiruvananthapuram & Ernakulam districts. The remaining 12 districts were divided into 5 clusters; Cluster I comprises Kozhikode, Wayanad and Malappuram; Cluster II Kottayam, Thodupuzha, and Pathanamthitta; Cluster III Kannur and Kasaragod; Cluster IV Thrissur and Palakkad; and Cluster V Kollam and Alappuzha.

COVID gravely affected the profitability and sustenance of this service, and the buses got rusted due to non usage and only 97 were functional out of which 70 were then given to City Circular Bus service. KURTC shut down all operations in 2022. Even their official website www.kurtc.in was closed down, thus signaling the end of a golden era of cheap and convenient transport service for customers.

== History ==
The Kerala Urban Road Transport Corporation was inaugurated in April 2015 by Oommen Chandy, the then Chief Minister of Kerala, with headquarters in Thevara in Kochi, to operate low-floor buses which were procured with the financial assistance from the Jawaharlal Nehru National Urban Renewal Mission (JNNURM). It featured a separate account and logo.

== Gallery ==
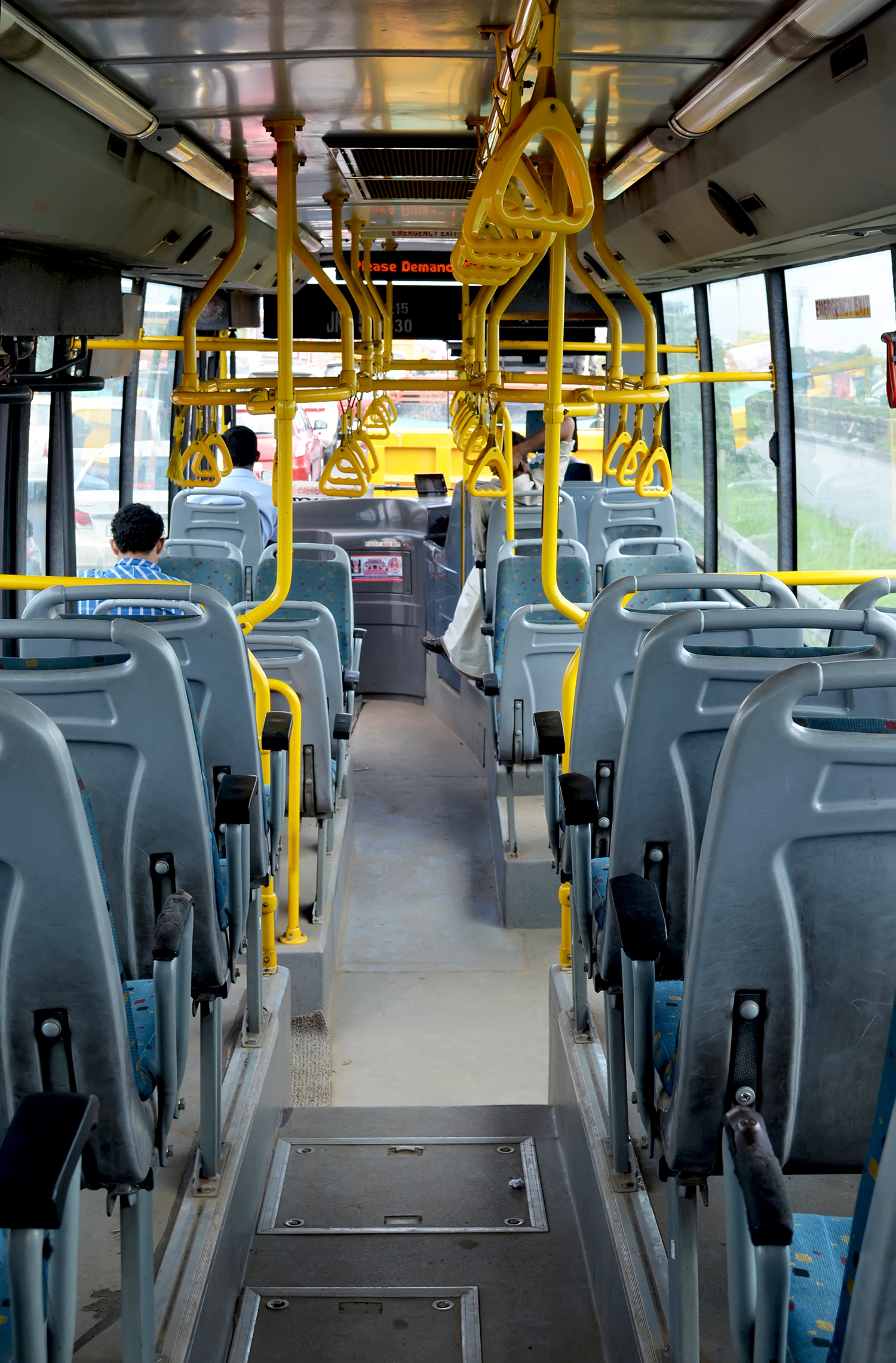
Interior of low-floor buses

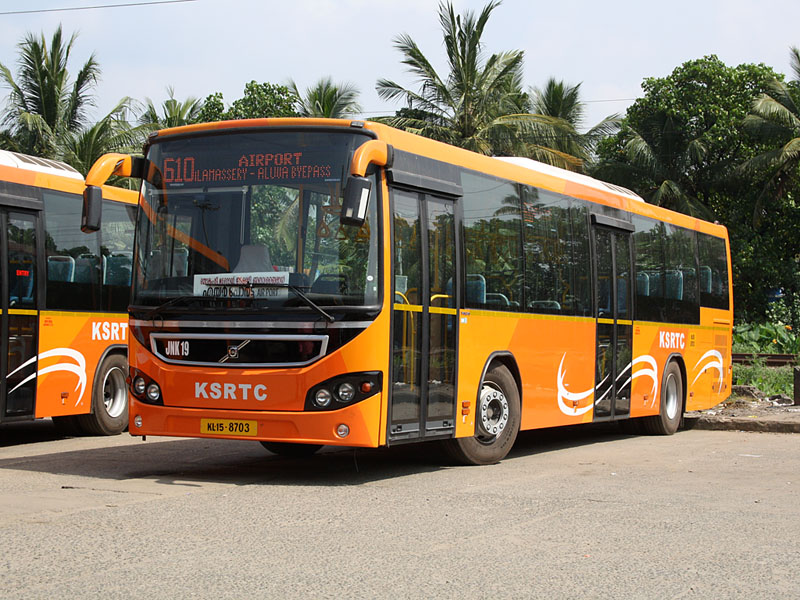
KURTC Volvo B7RLE

== See also ==
- Kerala State Road Transport Corporation
