= Thevara =

Thevara തേവര
- Ward
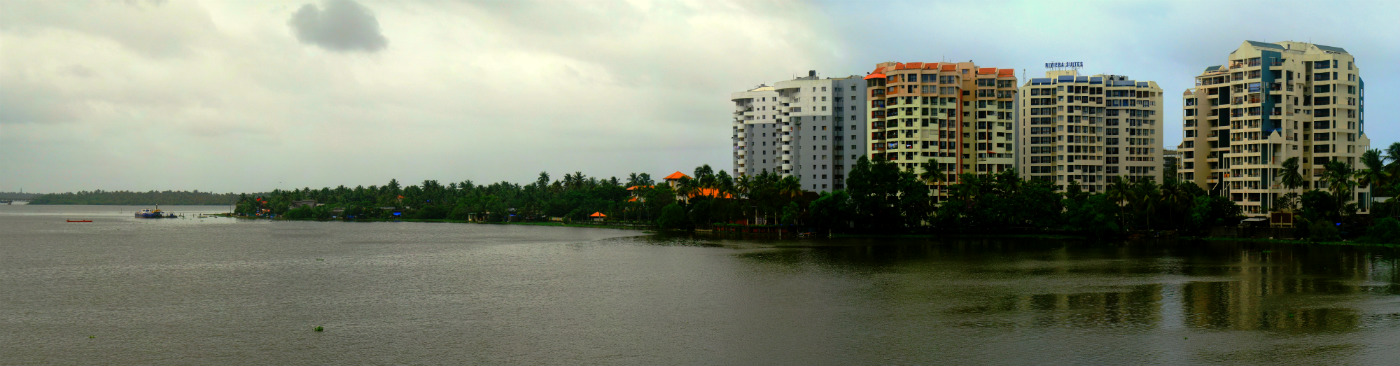
- A view of Thevara from Kundannur bridge

- Location in Kerala, India
- Coordinates: 9.934°N 76.300°E
- City: India
- State: Kerala
- District: Ernakulam

Languages
  - Official: Malayalam, English
- Time zone: UTC+5:30 (IST)
- PIN: 682013
- Telephone code: 0484
- Vehicle registration: KL-07
- Nearest city: Kochi
- Lok Sabha constituency: Ernakulam

Thevara is a region in the city of Kochi, Kerala.

== Geography ==
Thevara is part of the mainland Kochi and marks its south-west boundary. It is connected to the water-bound West Kochi via bridges.

Thevara is a link to Thevara Ferry and Konthuruthy which links the place like Kumbalam, Nettoor, Kadavanthra to other areas of Kochi city via waterway. The major artery of Kochi city starts from Kacheripady and ends at Thevara Junction.

Thevara is the first residential area one would come across after crossing over the Venduruthy Bridge to enter Ernakulam city. It is a quiet waterfront locale, about 2.5 km from the commercial center of M. G. Road and South Railway Station. Cochin International Airport is 33 km to the north-east. Ernakulam Central Bus Station is about 3 km from Thevara. The road via Kundannoor is an easy access to Cochin bypass.

== Places of interest ==
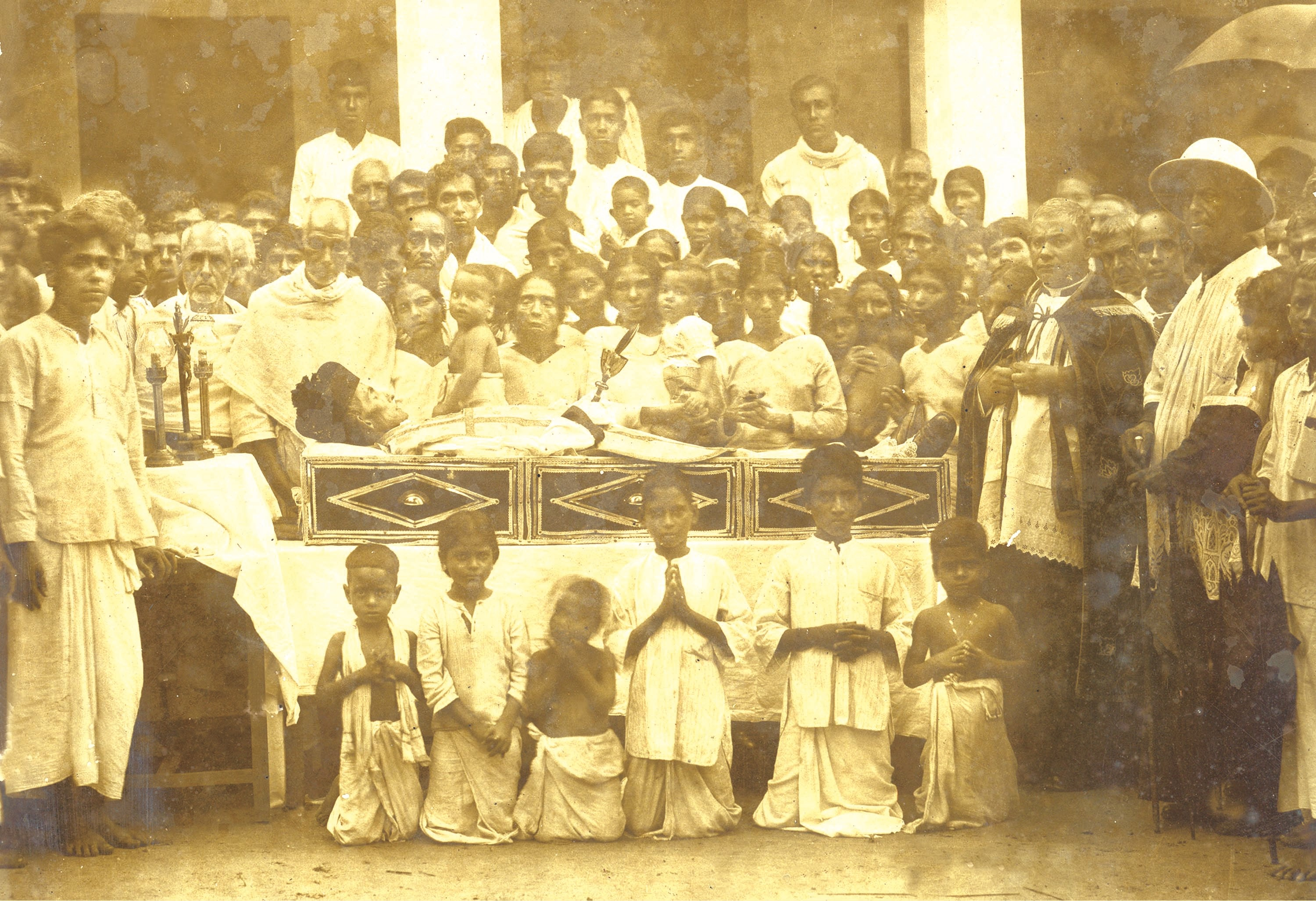
Funeral of Venerable Payyappilly Varghese Kathanar in Perumanoor on 6 October 1929

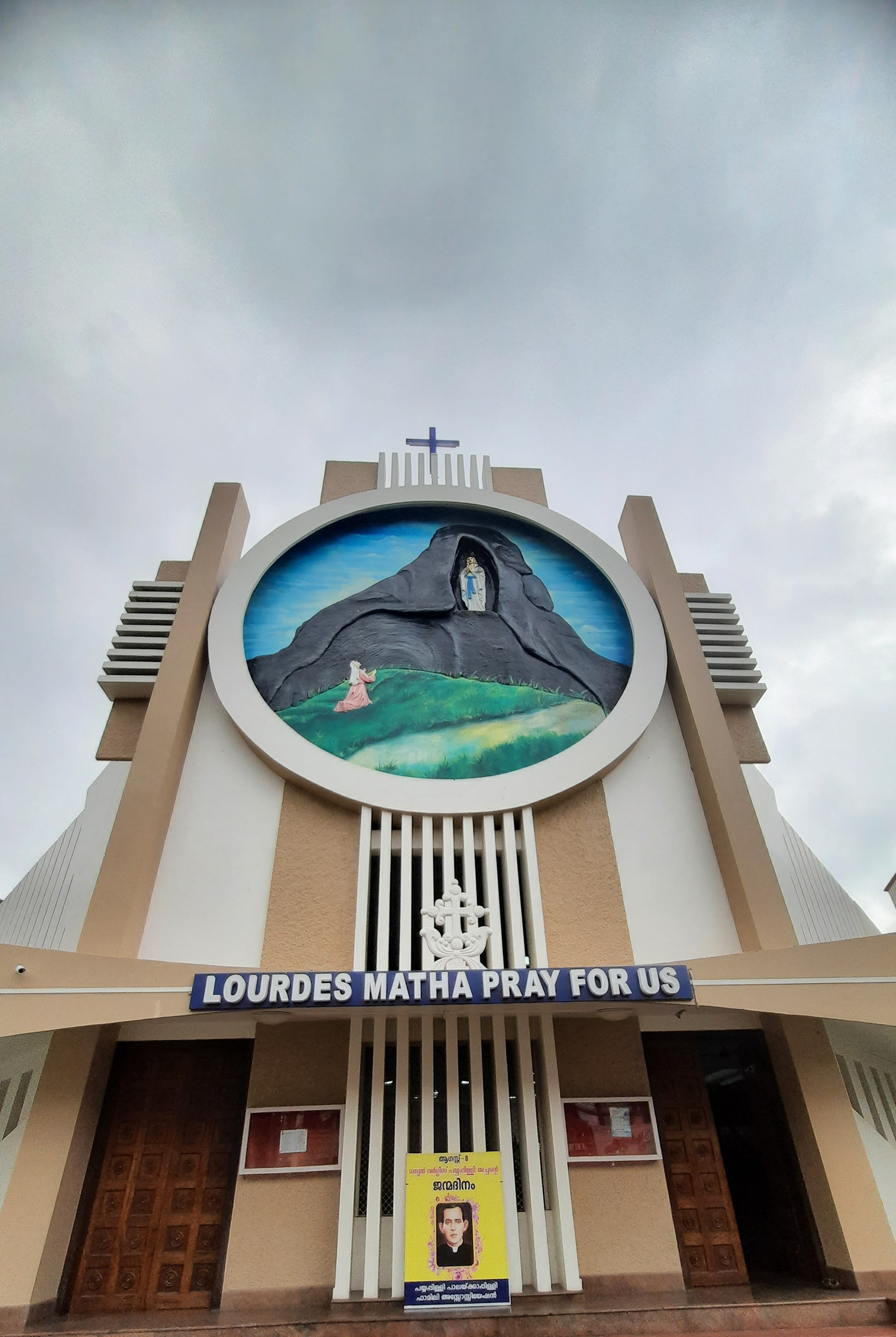
Lourde Syro-Malabar Church, Thevara

- Cochin Shipyard
- Sacred Heart College, Thevara
- Tomb of Mar Varghese Payyappilly Palakkappilly at Mar Yohannan Nepumsianose Syro-Malabar Church Konthuruthy
- Kochi Port Trust
- Kochi Naval Base
- Naval Airport, Kochi
- Headquarters of Kerala Urban Road Transport Corporation
- Cochin Harbour Terminus
- Kochi Gurudwara, Perumanoor - The only Gurudwara in the state
- S. D. Convent, Perumanoor and Konthuruthy
- Kerala Folklore Museum
- Queen of Vembnad, Backwater Boating Cruises
- St. Jude Shrine, Thevara
- Life Care Centre Hospital Maliyekal Road Thevara.
- JGT Living Spaces - Uparika Malika Luxury Apartments, Thevara

== Notable residents ==
- Mar Varghese Payyappilly Palakkappilly - Venerable and founder of the congregation of the Sisters of the Destitute (S. D.)
- Mohanlal - Malayalam actor
- Prithviraj Sukumaran - Malayalam actor
