= Tata Motors =

Indian multinational automobile manufacturing company

Tata Motors Limited
- Formerly: TML Commercial Vehicles Limited (2024–2025)
- Type: Public
- Traded as: BSE: 544569; NSE: TMCV
- ISIN: IN9155A01020
- Industry: Automotive
- Predecessor: Tata Motors (commercial vehicles division)
- Founded: 23 June 2024; 2 years ago
- Headquarters: Mumbai, Maharashtra, India
- Area served: Worldwide
- Products: Buses; Vans; Trucks; Automotive parts
- Services: Fleet management; Vehicle servicing
- Revenue: ▲₹84,979 crore (US$8.8 billion) (2026)
- Operating income: ▲₹4,663 crore (US$480 million) (2026)
- Net income: ▼₹3,030 crore (US$310 million) (2026)
- Total assets: ▲₹52,309 crore (US$5.4 billion) (2026)
- Total equity: ▲₹12,734 crore (US$1.3 billion) (2026)
- Number of employees: 20,635 (2026)
- Parent: Tata Group
- Subsidiaries: Tata Daewoo; Iveco; Tata Hitachi (40%)
- Website: cv.tatamotors.com
- Footnotes; Financials as of 31 March 2026

Tata Motors Limited, also known as Tata Motors Commercial Vehicles, is an Indian multinational commercial vehicle manufacturer, headquartered in Mumbai and is a part of the Tata Group. The company produces trucks, vans, and buses.

The company was incorporated in 2024 as TML Commercial Vehicles, after Tata Motors announced the demerger of its commercial vehicles business. In October 2025, the demerger came into effect and the demerged entity TML Commercial Vehicles was subsequently renamed Tata Motors, while the original Tata Motors was renamed Tata Motors Passenger Vehicles.

The company's notable subsidiaries include Tata Daewoo, Tata Marcopolo, and Iveco. Tata Motors has joint ventures with Hitachi (Tata Hitachi Construction Machinery) and Stellantis, which makes engines and vehicle components for Fiat Chrysler and Tata-branded vehicles.

== History ==
=== Background ===
Tata Group entered the commercial vehicle sector in 1954, after forming a joint venture with Mercedes-Benz of Germany in which Tata developed a manufacturing facility in Jamshedpur for Daimler lorries. By November 1954, Tata and Daimler manufactured their first goods carrier chassis at the Jamshedpur plant with 90-100 hp and capacity of 3-5 tons.

Following the liberalization of the economy in India in 1991, Mercedes-Benz partnered with TELCO to officially enter the Indian market to produce and launch the W124 Mercedes-Benz E-Class, marking the entry of the luxury brand segment in India. However, the car was not a success due to public perception, as Mercedes Benz had transitioned to the W210 E-Class globally. However, over the years, the W124 has been positively received for its reliability and simplicity. Mercedes Benz eventually launched the W210 E-class in 1998, producing the car in partnership with TELCO using CKD kits.

In the 2000s, Tata Motors made a series of acquisitions and partnerships, including the acquisition of Daewoo's South Korea-based truck manufacturing unit, a joint venture with the Brazil-based Marcopolo, Tata Marcopolo Bus, and the acquisition of Hispano Carrocera.

=== Demerger ===
In March 2024, the original Tata Motors announced that it would split into two separate listed entities through a demerger. Consequently, the commercial vehicles business was transferred to its wholly owned subsidiary called TML Commercial Vehicles Limited, which was incorporated on 23 June 2024. The India passenger vehicles business, Jaguar Land Rover, and the majority stake in Tata Technologies remained under Tata Motors.

The demerger went into effect on 1 October 2025. After the demerger, TML Commercial Vehicles was renamed Tata Motors, while the original Tata Motors was renamed Tata Motors Passenger Vehicles.

== Operations ==
Tata Motors has commercial vehicle manufacturing plants at Jamshedpur (Jharkhand), Lucknow (Uttar Pradesh), Pantnagar (Uttarakhand), and Dharwad (Karnataka).

=== Tata Daewoo ===
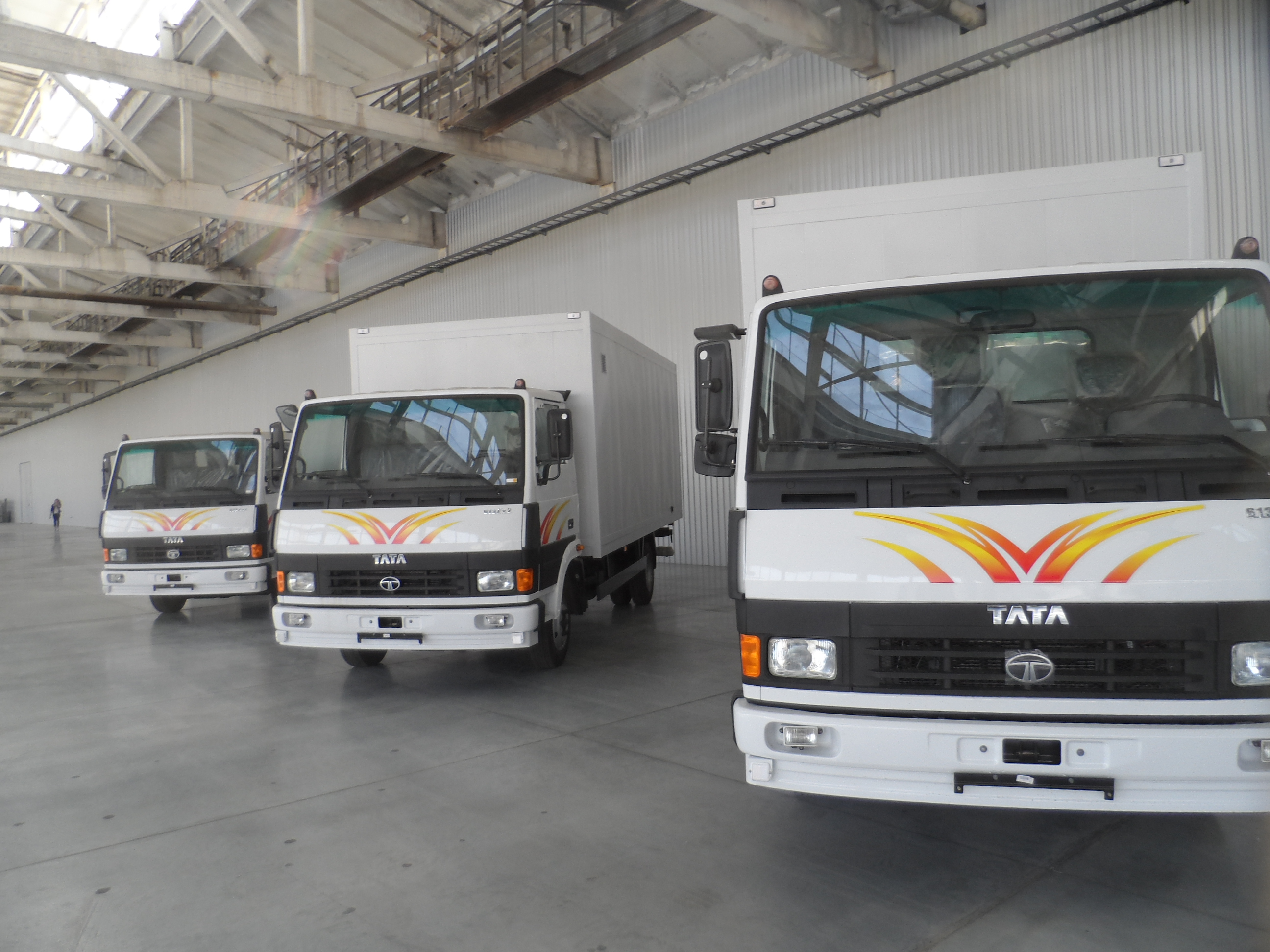
Tata LPT Trucks made at overseas plants

Tata Daewoo (officially Tata Daewoo Commercial Vehicle Company and formerly Daewoo Commercial Vehicle Company) is a commercial vehicle manufacturer headquartered in Gunsan, Jeollabuk-do, South Korea, and a wholly owned subsidiary of Tata Motors. It is the second-largest heavy commercial vehicle manufacturer in South Korea and was acquired by Tata Motors in 2004. The principal reasons behind the acquisition were to reduce Tata's dependence on the Indian commercial vehicle market (which was responsible for around 94% of its sales in the MHCV segment and around 84% in the light commercial vehicle segment) and expand its product portfolio by leveraging on Daewoo's strengths in the heavy-tonnage sector.

Tata Motors has jointly worked with Tata Daewoo to develop trucks such as Novus and World Truck and buses including GloBus and StarBus. In 2012, Tata began developing a new line to manufacture competitive and fuel-efficient commercial vehicles to face the competition posed by the entry of international brands such as Mercedes-Benz, Volvo, and Navistar into the Indian market.

=== Tata Marcopolo ===
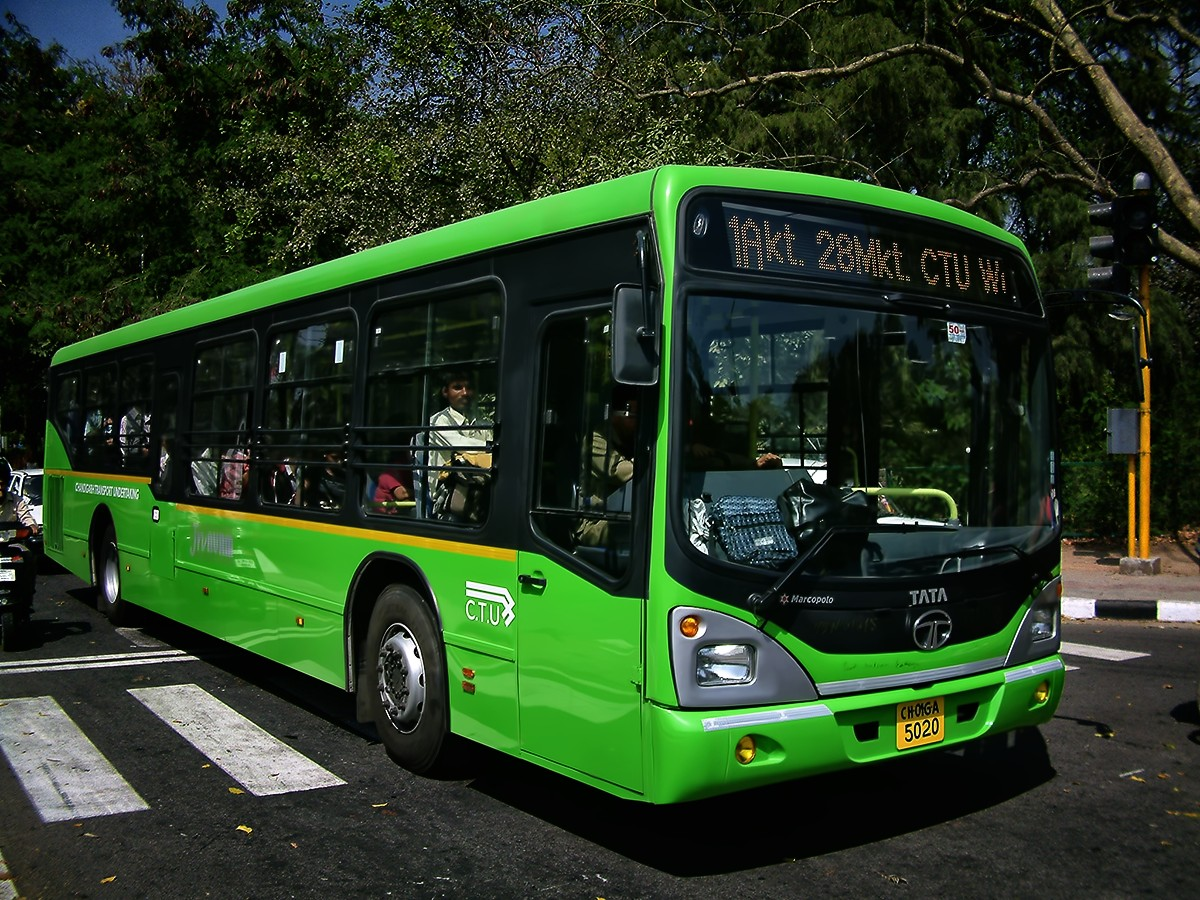
A Tata Marcopolo bus in use in Chandigarh, India

Tata Marcopolo is a bus-manufacturing company which was established as a joint venture between Tata Motors (51%) and the Brazil-based Marcopolo S.A. (49%). The company manufactures and assembles fully built buses and coaches targeted at developing mass rapid transportation systems. It uses technology and expertise in chassis and aggregates from Tata Motors, and know-how in processes and systems for bodybuilding and bus body design from Marcopolo. Tata Marcopolo's low-floor city bus is widely used by transport corporations in many Indian cities. Its manufacturing facility is based in Dharwad, Karnataka, India and Lucknow, Uttar Pradesh, India.

In December 2020, Marcopolo and Tata Motors came to an agreement, whereby Tata Motors would purchase the 49 percent stake held by Marcopolo in the bus-making joint venture for ₹100 crore, bringing curtains to the 14-year old partnership and paving the way for a smooth exit for the Brazilian company. The deal was completed on 29 August 2022. The deal allowed Tata Motors to continue using the ‘Marcopolo’ trademark for a minimum of three years with a non-compete provision in India for a corresponding period.

== Former subsidiaries ==
=== Tata Hispano ===
Tata Hispano Motors Carrocera, S.A. was a bus and coach manufacturer based in Zaragoza, Aragon, Spain, and a wholly owned subsidiary of Tata Motors. Tata Hispano had plants in Zaragoza, Spain, and Casablanca, Morocco. Tata Motors first acquired a 21% stake in Hispano Carrocera SA in 2005, and purchased the remaining 79% for an undisclosed sum in 2009, making it a fully owned subsidiary, subsequently renamed Tata Hispano. In 2013, Tata Hispano ceased production at its Zaragoza plant.

=== TML Drivelines ===
TML Drivelines Ltd. was a wholly owned subsidiary of Tata Motors engaged in the manufacture of gearboxes and axles for heavy and medium commercial vehicles. It has production facilities at Jamshedpur and Lucknow. TML Drivelines was formed through the merger of HV Transmission and HV Axles. TML Drivelines was merged with Tata Motors in 2017.

== Products ==
The company's commercial vehicles include:

- Tata Ace
  - Tata Ace Pro
  - Tata Ace EV
  - Tata Super Ace
  - Tata Ace Mega
- Tata Intra
  - Tata Intra V10
  - Tata Intra V20
  - Tata Intra V30
  - Tata Intra V50
  - Tata Intra V70
- Tata Xenon XT
- Tata Yodha
- Tata Iris
- Tata Yodha/Xenon Pick-up truck
- Tata Azura
- Tata 407 Ex and Ex2
- Tata 709 Ex
- Tata 807 (Steel cabin chassis, cowl chassis, medium bus chassis, steel cabin + steel body chassis)
- Tata 809 Ex and Ex2
- Tata 909 Ex and Ex2
- Tata 1210 SE and SFC (Semi Forward)
- Tata 1210 LP (Long Plate)
- Tata 1109 (Intermediate truck/ LCV bus)
- Tata 1512c (Medium bus chassis)
- Tata 1515c/1615 (Medium bus chassis)
- Tata 1612c/1616c/1618c (Heavy bus chassis)
- Tata 1618 (Semilow-floor bus chassis)
- Tata 1623 (Rear-engined low-floor bus chassis)
- Tata 1518C (Medium truck) 10 ton
- Tata 1613/1615c (Medium truck)
- Tata 1616/1618c (Heavy duty truck)
- Tata 2515c/2516c/2518c (Heavy duty 10-wheeler truck)
- Tata Starbus (Branded buses for city, intercity, school bus, and standard passenger transportation)
- Tata Divo (Hispano Divo)
- Tata CityRide (12- to 20-seater buses for intracity use)
- Tata 3015 (Heavy truck)
- Tata 3118 (Heavy truck) (8×2)
- Tata 3516 (Heavy truck)
- Tata 4018 (Heavy truck)
- Tata 4923 (Ultraheavy truck) (6×4)
- Tata Novus
- Tata Prima
- Tata SIGNA series
- Tata Ultra series (ICV Segment)
- Tata Winger - (minivan)

== Notable vehicles ==
=== Tata 407 ===
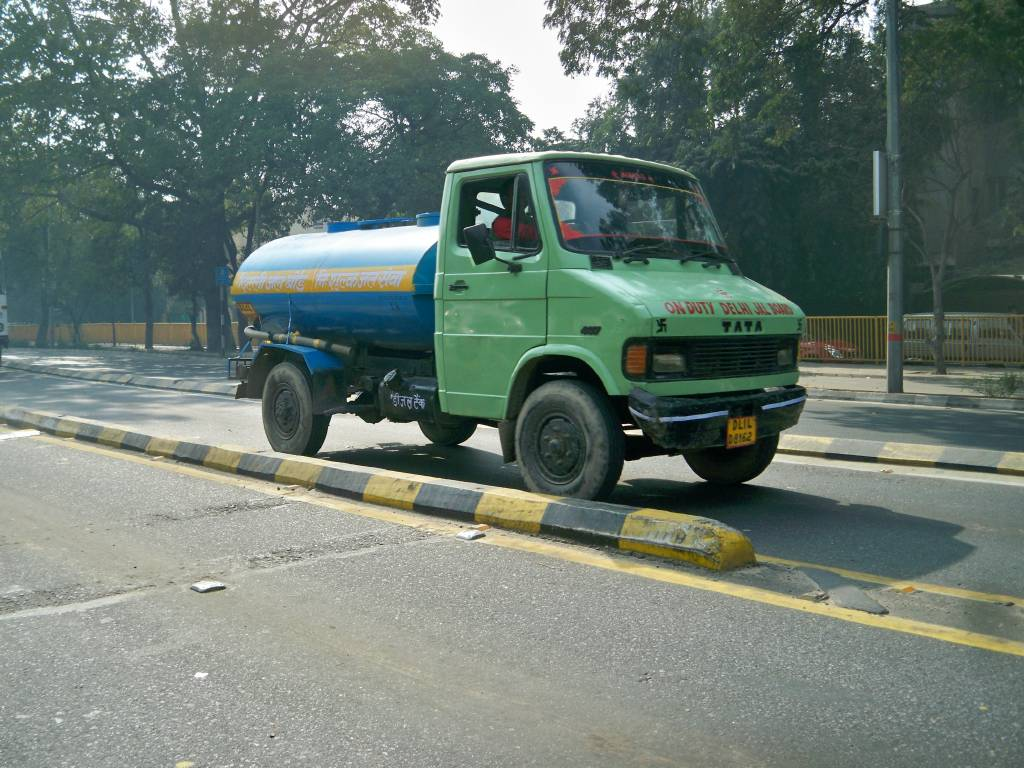
A Tata 407 being used as water truck

The Tata 407 is a light commercial vehicle (LCV). According to the Tata Motors 2011-2012 annual report, the vehicle had sold over 500,000 units since its 1986 launch and accounted for close to 75% of LCV sales during that period.

=== Tata Ace ===
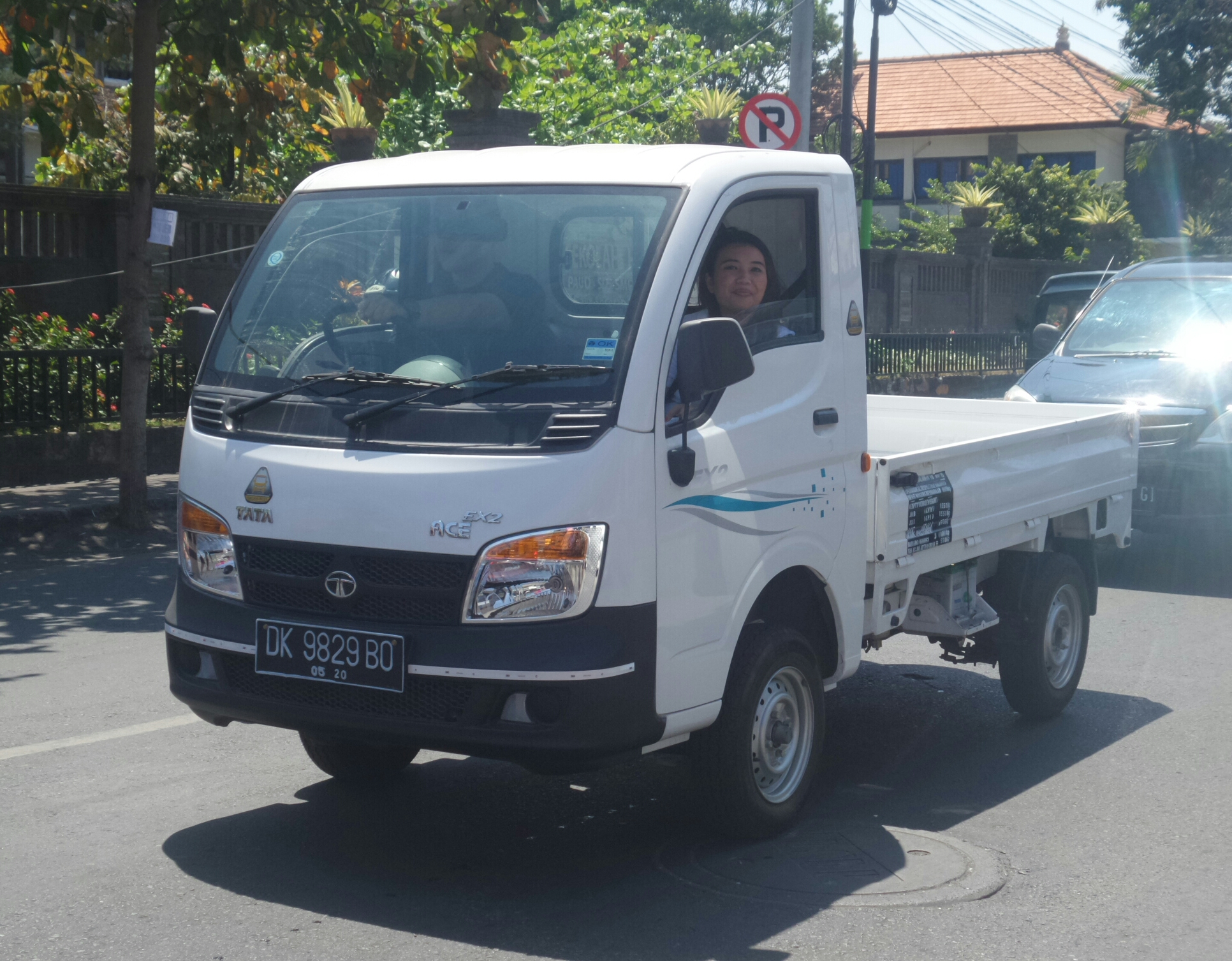
Tata Ace EX2 (Indonesia)

Tata Ace, India's first indigenously developed sub-one-ton minitruck, was launched in May 2005. The minitruck was a huge success in India with auto analysts claiming that Ace had changed the dynamics of the LCV market in the country by creating a new market segment termed the small commercial vehicle segment. Ace rapidly emerged as the first choice for transporters and single truck owners for city and rural transport.

By October 2005, LCV sales of Tata Motors had grown by 36.6% to 28,537 units due to the rising demand for Ace. The Ace was built with a load body produced by Autoline Industries.

By 2005, Autoline was producing 300 load bodies per day for Tata Motors. Ace is still a top seller for TML with 500,000 units sold by June 2010. In 2011, Tata Motors invested Rs 1000 crore in Dharwad Plant, Karnataka, with the capacity of 90,000 units annually and launched two models of 0.5-T capacity as Tata Ace Zip, Magic Iris. Ace has also been exported to several Asian, European, South American, and African countries and all-electric models are sold through Polaris Industries' Global Electric Motorcars division. In Sri Lanka, it is sold through Diesel & Motor Engineering (DIMO) PLC under the name of DIMO Batta.

=== Tata Xenon/Yodha ===
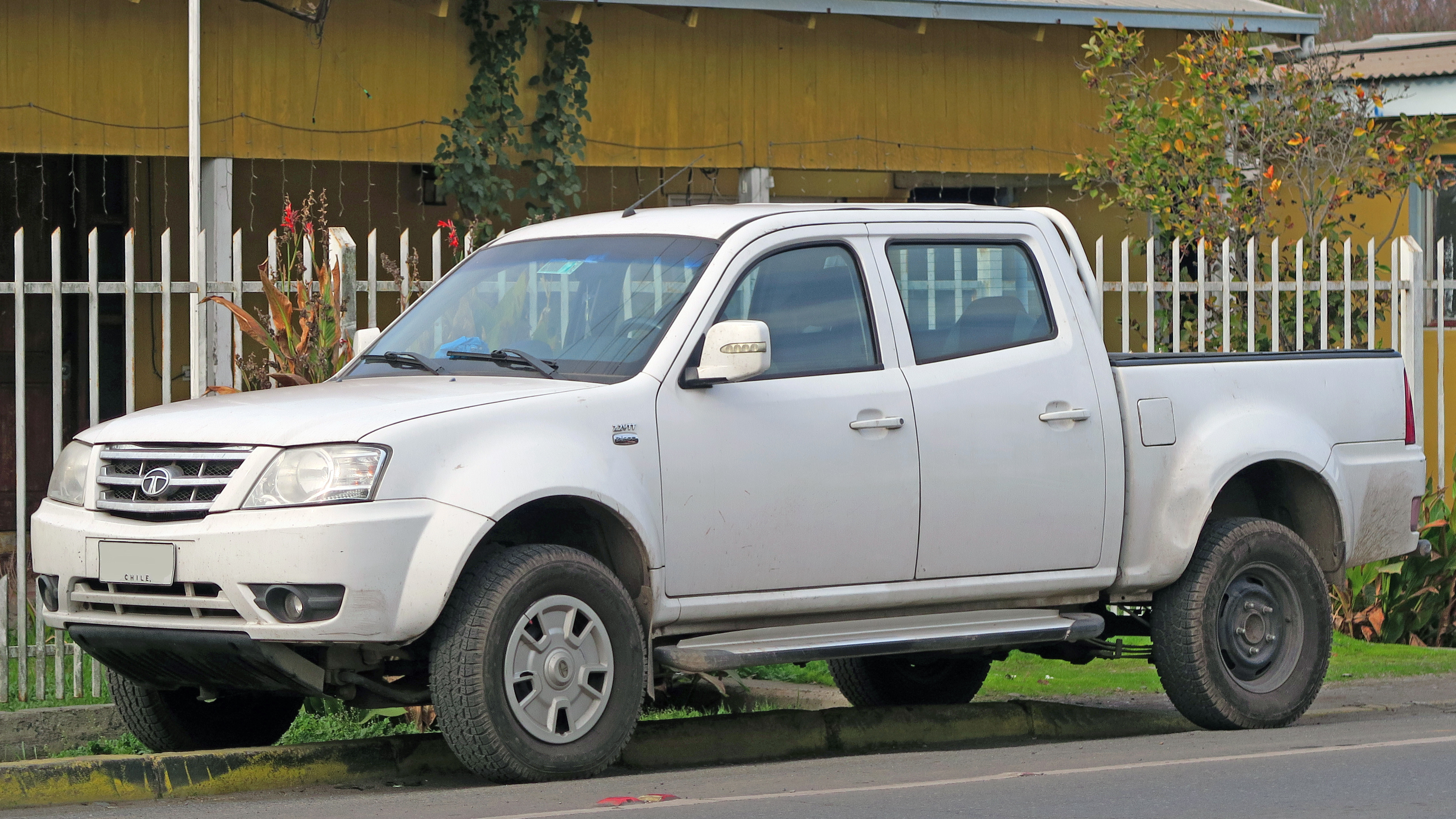
Tata Xenon DLE 2014

Tata Xenon, also called the Tata Yodha, is a mid size pickup truck first introduced in 1988 as the Tata Telcoline. The second generation pickup truck called the Xenon has been produced since 2006, with its facelift being produced as the Yodha.

=== Tata Prima ===
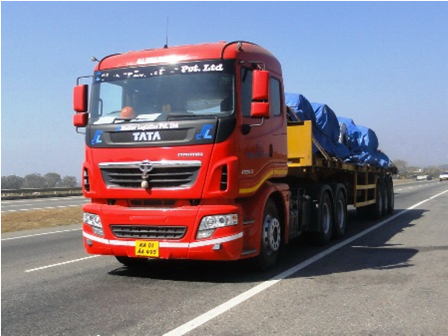
A Tata Prima 4928.S in Assam, India

Tata Prima is a range of heavy trucks first introduced in 2008 as the company's 'global' truck. Tata Prima was the winner of the 'Commercial Vehicle of the Year' at the Apollo Commercial Vehicles Awards, 2010 and 2012.

== See also ==
- List of companies of India
- Make in India
- Automotive industry in India
