= Ashok Leyland 12M =

Indian manufactured bus chassis range

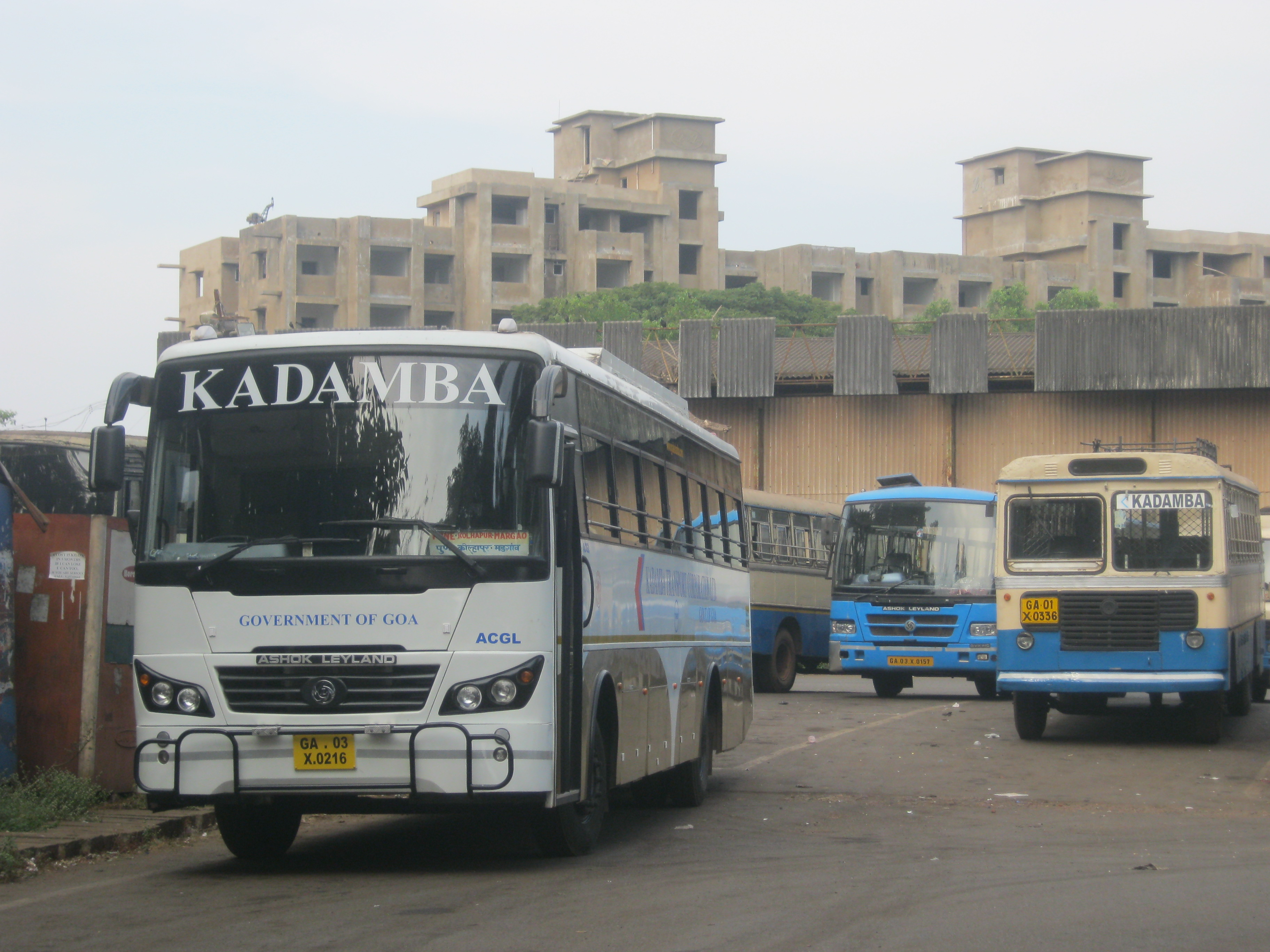

Overview
- Type: Bus Chassis
- Manufacturer: Ashok Leyland

Body and chassis
- Layout: Front engine, Rear wheel drive

Powertrain
- Engine: 'H' Series ETI, 'H' Series DTI
- Power output: 113 hp (84 kW), 164 hp (122 kW), 165 hp (123 kW), 177 hp (132 kW), 180 hp (130 kW), 205 hp (153 kW), 221 hp (165 kW), 225 hp (168 kW)
- Transmission: 5 Speed Synchromesh, 6 Speed Synchromesh Overdrive Gearbox

Dimensions
- Wheelbase: 6,200 mm (20 ft 4 1/8 in)
- Length: 11,700 mm (38 ft 4 5/8 in)

The 12M is a bus chassis range manufactured by Indian vehicle manufacturer Ashok Leyland. The "12M" denotes the chassis length which is 11.7 meters. This chassis is primarily aimed at Inter state bus operators has a good presence in Indian roads. The front engine rear wheel driven bus was introduced in 2000s. Currently this chassis is provided with diesel engine only. The chassis has various options like air conditioner, retarder, full air suspension, automated transmission.

== BS II ==
In the BS II range the bus had 4 engine options, 113 hp (84 kW), 164 hp (122 kW), 177 hp (132 kW) and 205 hp (153 kW). All the engines were turbo charged and inter-cooled. All variants had 6 speed synchromesh gearbox with overdrive and radial tyres except the 113 hp (84 kW) variant which had 5 Speed synchromesh gearbox and cross-ply tyres. The top end 205 hp (153 kW) chassis provided with optional air conditioning, retarder and air suspension.

- ALPSV 4/106
- ALPSV 4/107
- ALPSV 4/114
- ALPSV 4/86

== BS III ==
The company offered the model with 3 engine options when BS III norms become mandatory. 164 hp, 180 hp (130 kW) and 225 hp (168 kW). The 225 hp variant ALPSV 4/225, was the early bus chassis apart from Volvo buses, to offer common rail diesel engines in BS III platform. The buses also featured 'H' Series engines. The 165 engine came with inline fuel injection pump (FIP) while 180 hp version had electronic diesel control (EDC). All variants came with 6 speed synchromesh overdrive gearbox and optional anti braking system (ABS). The 225 hp engine variant had electromagnetic retarder with an optional Leymatic automated manual transmission.

- ALPSV 4/157
- ALPSV 4/160
- ALPSV 4/169
- ALPSR 3/33 Rear Engine

== BS IV ==
In BS IV lineup all engines featured common rail with the addition of SCR and i-EGR to meet BS IV norms. The low end 165 hp engine featured Ashok Leyland's indigenous i-EGR while 177 hp, 221 hp had SCR. ABS become a standard fitment. Tyre can be chosen between radials and tubeless radials.
