= Ashok Leyland Viking =

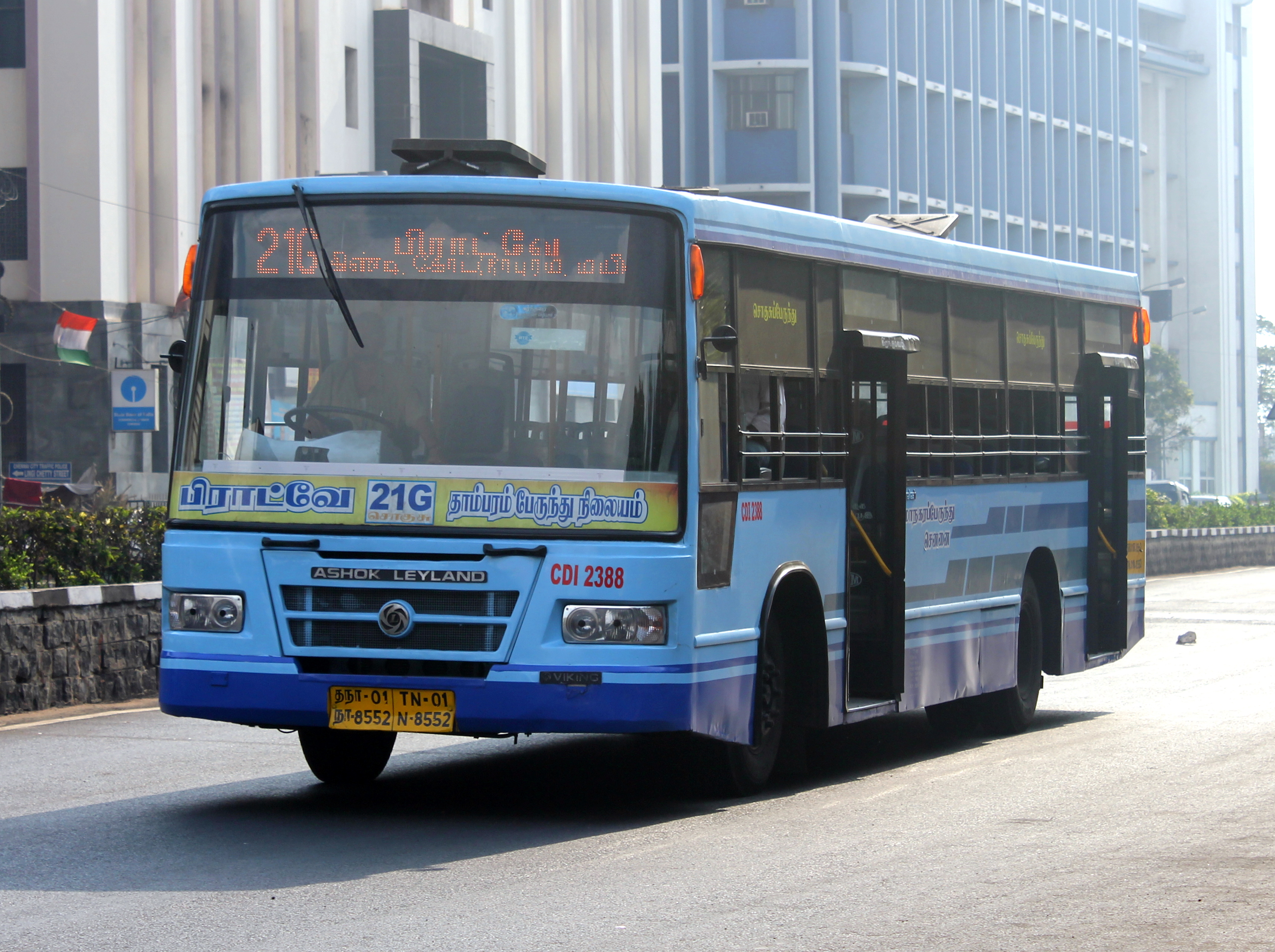
- Metropolitan Transport Corporation 183hp BS III Viking in April 2011

Overview
- Manufacturer: Ashok Leyland
- Production: 1976 - Present

Body and chassis
- Layout: Front Engine; Rear wheel drive
- Floor type: Step entrance
- Related: Albion Viking

Powertrain
- Engine: Inline-6 Diesel engine
- Power output: 160 bhp, 180 bhp

The Ashok Leyland Viking is a front engined bus chassis manufactured by Ashok Leyland that is primarily intended for intercity, urban to rural duties and was introduced in 1976. It was based on the English Albion Viking. Since then, Viking has attracted a lot of buyers in private and government sectors in India. It was the first bus with an alternator in India. The Viking chassis also has a larger front overhang that facilitates placing the front door before front axle.

In 1997, a naturally aspirated CNG engine option specifically designed for BEST was introduced. The company also launched a two step entry Viking bus chassis in 2003, as an alternative to the three step entry buses of that time. This chassis had a floor height of 860mm.

Currently the Viking lineup consists of diesel and CNG engines conforming to BS VI norms. The chassis is also available in 4 wheelbase options. The chassis has an intelligent exhaust gas recirculation ('iEGR) system, which is a modified version of the original exhaust gas recirculation system.
