= Kaloor metro station =

Metro station in Kochi, India

Kaloor

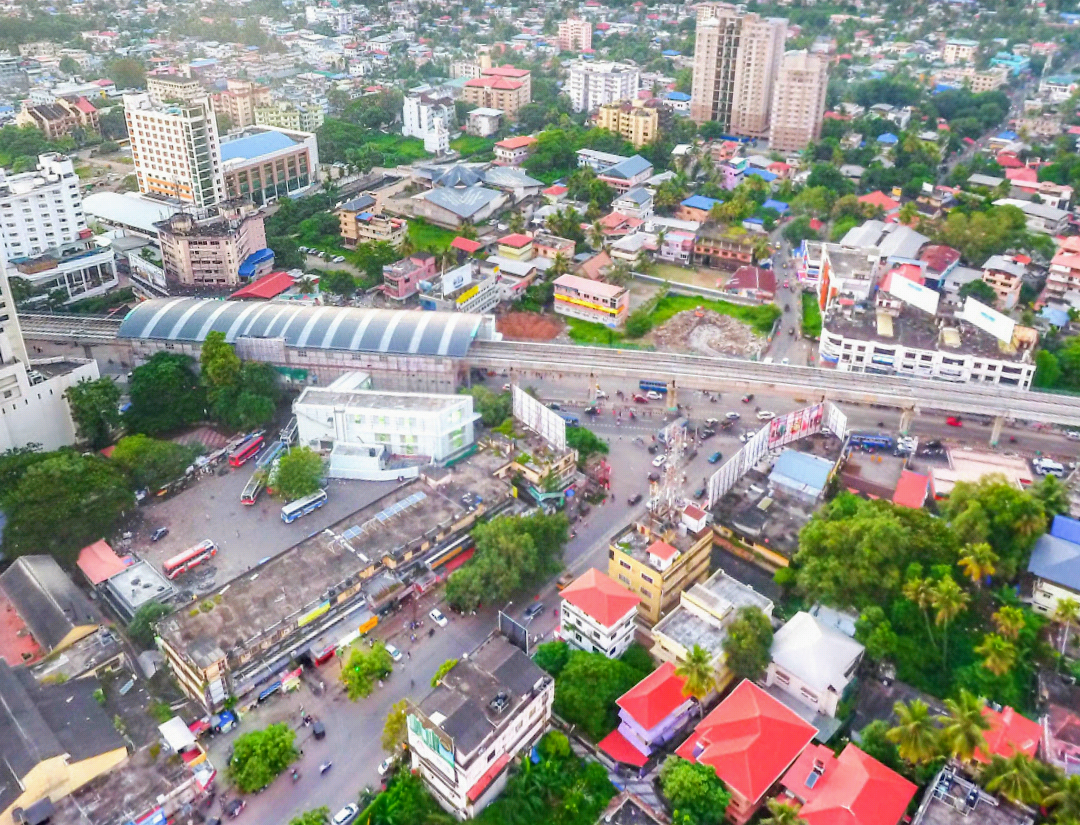
- Kaloor junction with the metro station

General information
- Coordinates: 9.994484°N 76.291669°E
- System: Kochi Metro rapid transit

History
- Opened: 3 October 2017

Services
Preceding station	Kochi Metro	Following station
J. L. N. Stadium towards Aluva	Line 1	Town Hall towards Thrippunithura Terminal
Route map
Location
- Location within Kochi

Kaloor is a station of Kochi Metro. It was opened on 3 October 2017 as a part of the extension of the metro system from Palarivattom to Maharaja's College. The station is located between J. L. N. Stadium and Town Hall. The name of the station refers to the region of Kaloor.
