= Ernakulam KSRTC Bus Station =

State transport bus station

Coordinates: 9.9778°N 76.2889°E

Ernakulam KSRTC bus station എറണാകുളം കെ.എസ്സ്.ആര്‍.ടി.സി ബസ്സ്‌ സ്റ്റേഷന്‍
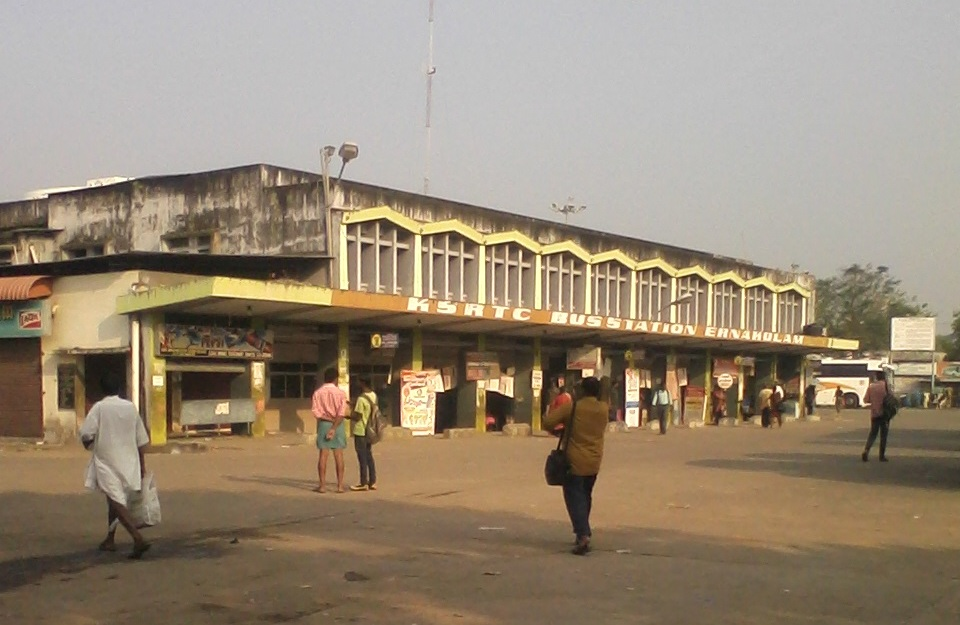
- Ernakulam KSRTC Bus Station before renovation in 2012

General information
- Location: Kochi, Ernakulam, Kerala
- System: Bus station
- Owner: Kerala State Road Transport Corporation (KSRTC)
- Operator: KSRTC
- Bus stands: (Towards TVM, KZKD, MNR & TSR)
- Bus operators: List: KSRTC (Interstate & Intrastate); KURTC (Intrastate)
- Connections: Bus; Ernakulam Junction railway station Maharaja's College metro station

Construction
- Structure type: At grade
- Parking: Yes

Other information
- Station code: ERS
- Fare zone: Ernakulam Zone

History
- Opened: ?

Ernakulam KSRTC bus station is a transport hub in the Indian city of Kochi, owned and operated by the Kerala State Road Transport Corporation (KSRTC). An important transport hub in the state, the station is located adjacent to Ernakulam Junction railway station, one of the busiest railway stations in South India, and a kilometre away from Maharaja's College metro station of Kochi Metro. Ernakulam KSRTC Bus Station is used mostly as the hub for long distance buses including the Fast Passenger, Super Fast, Super Express and Super Deluxe services. Ernakulam Jetty KSRTC Bus Station located next to the Ernakulam Boat Jetty on Park Avenue, Marine Drive is the hub for coastal, regional, and ordinary routes such as to Guruvayoor and Kothamangalam.

== Renovation ==
The bus station was renovated using CSR money from BPCL and Geojit and also with Ernakulam MLA fund. BPCL provided 99 lakhs and Geojit provided 12 lakhs. The renovation was completed in three phases using another 77.7 lakh from the MLA fund.

There is a resting area fitted with chairs, the AC restroom renovated and upgraded and toilets are refurbished. A reading corner has been set up inside the station. There is also a medical corner, where first aid and other primary healthcare can be provided.

== See also ==
- Aluva KSRTC bus station
- Kerala State Road Transport Corporation
- Vyttila Mobility Hub
