= Mahatma Gandhi Road metro station =

Mahatma Gandhi Road metro station may refer to these metro stations in India situated on various roads named after Mahatma Gandhi:

- Mahatma Gandhi Road metro station (Bengaluru)
- MG Bus Station metro station (Hyderabad Metro)
- MG Road metro station (Gurgaon)
- M. G. Road metro station (Kochi)
- Mahatma Gandhi Road metro station (Kolkata)
