= Pink Line (Kochi Metro) =

Line of Kochi metro

Overview
- Native name: പിങ്ക് ലൈൻ
- Owner: Kochi Metro Rail Limited
- Locale: Kochi, Kerala, India
- Termini: J. L. N. Stadium; Smart City
- Stations: 12 (Including interchange station)

Service
- Type: Rapid transit
- System: Kochi Metro
- Operator: Kochi Metro Rail Limited
- Rolling stock: Alstom Metropolis

History
- Planned opening: August 2027

Technical
- Line length: 11.2 km (7.0 mi)
- Character: Elevated
- Track gauge: 1,435 mm (4 ft 8 1/2 in) standard gauge
- Electrification: 750 V DC third rail
- Operating speed: 80 km/h (50 mph)

The Pink Line is an under-construction line of the Kochi Metro system serving the city of Kochi, India It is being constructed as the second phase of Kochi Metro and is expected to be inaugurated in August 2027. It will be owned and operated by Kochi Metro Rail Limited, a 50:50 joint venture between Government of India and Government of Kerala. It connects places in Kakkanad and the Kochi Infopark to the rest of the city.

== Stations ==
Pink Line
#	Stations name		Opening	Connections
#	English	Malayalam	Opening	Connections
1	JLN Stadium	ജെ. എൽ. എൻ സ്റ്റേഡിയം	Under Construction	Blue Line
2	Palarivattom Jn	പാലാരിവട്ടം ജംഗ്ഷൻ	Under Construction	
3	Palarivattom Bye-pass	പാലാരിവട്ടം ബൈപാസ്	Under Construction	
4	Chembumukku	ചെമ്പുമുക്ക്	Under Construction	
5	Vazhakkala	വാഴക്കാല	Under Construction	
6	Padamugal	പദമുഗൾ	Under Construction	
7	Kakkanad Jn	കാക്കനാട് ജംഗ്ഷൻ	Under Construction	
8	Cochin SEZ	കൊച്ചി എസ്.ഇ.സെഡ്	Under Construction	
9	Chittethukara	ചിറ്റേത്തുകര	Under Construction	
10	KINFRA Park	കിൻഫ്ര പാർക്ക്	Under Construction	
11	Infopark	ഇൻഫോപാർക്ക്	Under Construction	
12	Smart City	സ്മാർട്ട് സിറ്റി	Under Construction	

== See also ==
- Transport in Kochi
- Blue Line (Kochi Metro)
- Kochi Water Metro
- Rapid transit in India
