= Town Hall Kochi =

Coordinates: 9.9879°N 76.2864°E

Town Hall Kochi is located in Banerji Road, Kochi, Kerala. It is one of the city's most iconic civic and cultural landmarks. It is hosting public functions since the year 1961.

== Infrastructure ==
The complex has two primary event spaces. The main hall (Hall 1) is a non-AC space with a seating capacity of around 880 people (and a maximum capacity of up to 1,350). The mini hall (Hall 2) is a smaller setup that accommodates 335 seats (up to 550 maximum capacity), ideal for more compact community gatherings or seminars.

== Location ==
The Town Hall Metro Station is located just a short walk away, making it a highly accessible hub for commuters bypassing city traffic. Ernakulam Town (North) Railway Station is right around the corner, which makes it highly convenient for outstation attendees traveling into Kochi for events. It is situated very close to the prominent Lissie Hospital.
