= Town Hall railway station =

Town Hall railway station or Town Hall station may refer to:

- Town Hall railway station, Melbourne, Australia
- Town Hall railway station, Sydney, Australia
- Town Hall metro station, Kochi Metro, India
