= Minnal (KSRTC) =

High-Speed bus service operated by KSRTC

Minnal Super Air Deluxe
- A KSRTC Minnal bus in 2023
- Parent: Kerala State Road Transport Corporation
- Founded: 2017
- Locale: Kerala
- Service area: Kerala, Tamil Nadu, Karnataka
- Service type: Non AC
- Operator: KSRTC
- Website: www.keralartc.com

Minnal (transl. Lightning) or Minnal Super Air Deluxe is a fleet of limited-stop high-speed long-distance bus service operated by the Kerala State Road Transport Corporation (KSRTC) in the Indian state of Kerala. Introduced in 2017, most of the Minnal services are operated as night service and has limited number of stops to reduce travel time between the routes.

== Overview ==
Mananthavady–Thiruvananthapuram Minnal bus in 2024

KSRTC launched the Minnal service in June 2017. The 41-seat super-deluxe buses with 2+2 recliner seats and air suspension on its rear axle has decreased number of stoppages and faster travel duration. The Minnal buses are painted in a combination of white and red. Its sides are inscribed with motifs and pattern resembling a lightning bolt, reflecting the name Minnal which means lightning in Malayalam. The service was introduced initially by connecting the state's capital Thiruvananthapuram with destinations located in Central and Northern Kerala.

Palakkad- Thiruvananthapuram Minnal bus in 2026

Minnal bus has very few stops unlike Super Fast and Fast Passenger services which has comparatively more stops. It also takes bypass roads, and avoids travelling through towns reducing the travel time. For this reason, most of the Minnal services are operated as night services, with schedules designed to reduce overall journey time rather than increase the buses' maximum operating speed. In November 2024, the Thiruvananthapuram–Palakkad Minnal service reportedly arrived the destination 35 minutes earlier than the Amritha Express which operates through the same route, despite the bus departing late at night.

== See also ==
- Super Fast (KSRTC)
- Fast Passenger (KSRTC)
- Kerala State Road Transport Corporation
- KSRTC SWIFT
