= Kochi Metro =

Rapid transit system in Kochi, India

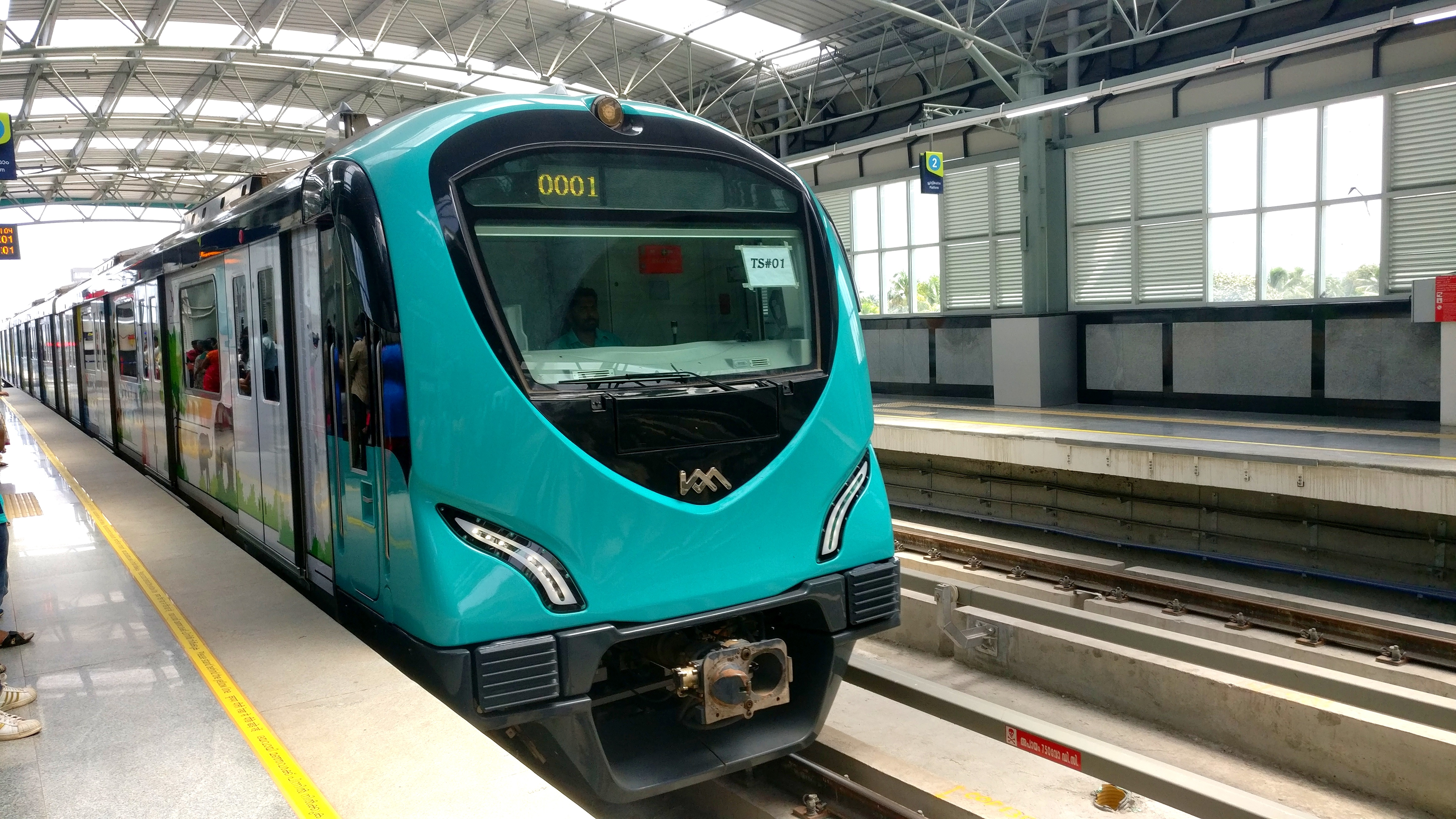
- A train at Palarivattom metro station

Overview
- Owner: Kochi Metro Rail Limited
- Locale: Kochi, Kerala, India
- Transit type: Rapid Transit
- Number of lines: 1
- Line number: Operational (1): Blue Line; Under construction (1): Pink Line
- Number of stations: Operational: 25; Under Construction: 11; Proposed: 15
- Daily ridership: 125,000 (2026)
- Annual ridership: 3.65 crores (36.5 million - 2025)
- Chief executive: G Priyanka IAS, Managing Director(Temporary Charge)
- Headquarters: Jawaharlal Nehru Stadium Metro Station, 4th Floor, Kaloor, Kochi, Kerala – 682017
- Website: Kochi Metro

Operation
- Began operation: 17 June 2017; 9 years ago
- Operator: KMRL
- Character: Elevated
- Train length: 3 coaches
- Headway: 8 minutes

Technical
- System length: 28.12 km (17.47 mi) (operational); 11.2 km (7.0 mi) (Phase II – Under construction); 17.5 km (10.9 mi) (Phase III – Planned)
- Track gauge: 1,435 mm (4 ft 8 1/2 in) standard gauge
- Electrification: 750 V DC third rail

The Kochi Metro is a rapid transit system serving the city of Kochi and the Kochi Metropolitan Region in Kerala, India. It is the first metro rail system in the country to be operated using the Communication-Based Train Control (CBTC) signalling system, which requires minimum human intervention. The Kochi Water Metro is integrated with the Kochi Metro, which also serves as a feeder service to the suburbs along the rivers where transport accessibility is limited.

Kochi metro was constructed by Delhi Metro Rail Corporation. It is being constructed in three phases. The first phase of the project was completed within four years after the beginning of construction making it one of the fastest completed metro projects in India. The second phase called the Pink Line is currently under construction and the proposed third phase extending to Angamaly via the Cochin International Airport is under early development stage.

The Kochi Metro Rail Limited (KMRL), a joint venture between the Government of India and the Government of Kerala, operates the Kochi Metro. The construction work of the first phase began in June 2013. The 13.4 km (8.3 mi) section of the line from Aluva to Palarivattom consisting of 11 stations was opened to passengers on 17 June 2017 by Narendra Modi, the Prime Minister of India. The complete first phase spanning 28.125 km (17.476 mi) from Aluva to Thrippunithura with 25 stations was completed in March 2024 at an estimated cost of ₹7,100 crore (equivalent to ₹82 billion or US$880 million in 2026). The second phase from JLN Stadium to Infopark-Kakkanad, known as the Pink Line, is expected to be commissioned by 2027.

Kochi Metro was lauded for its decision to employ Kudumbashree workers and also members of the transgender community. It is the world's first rapid transit system whose entire management operations are handled by women. The system is also involved in sustainable initiatives with the introduction of non-motorized transport corridors in the city, installation of solar panels for power and vertical garden on every sixth metro pillar. Every Kochi Metro station is designed on a specific theme around Kerala culture and geography. Apart from the regular tickets, it has also adopted a single card, single timetable and a singular command and control. In October 2017, Kochi Metro was named the Best Urban Mobility Project in India by the Urban Development Ministry, as part of the Urban Mobility India (UMI) international conference hosted by the ministry every year.

== History ==
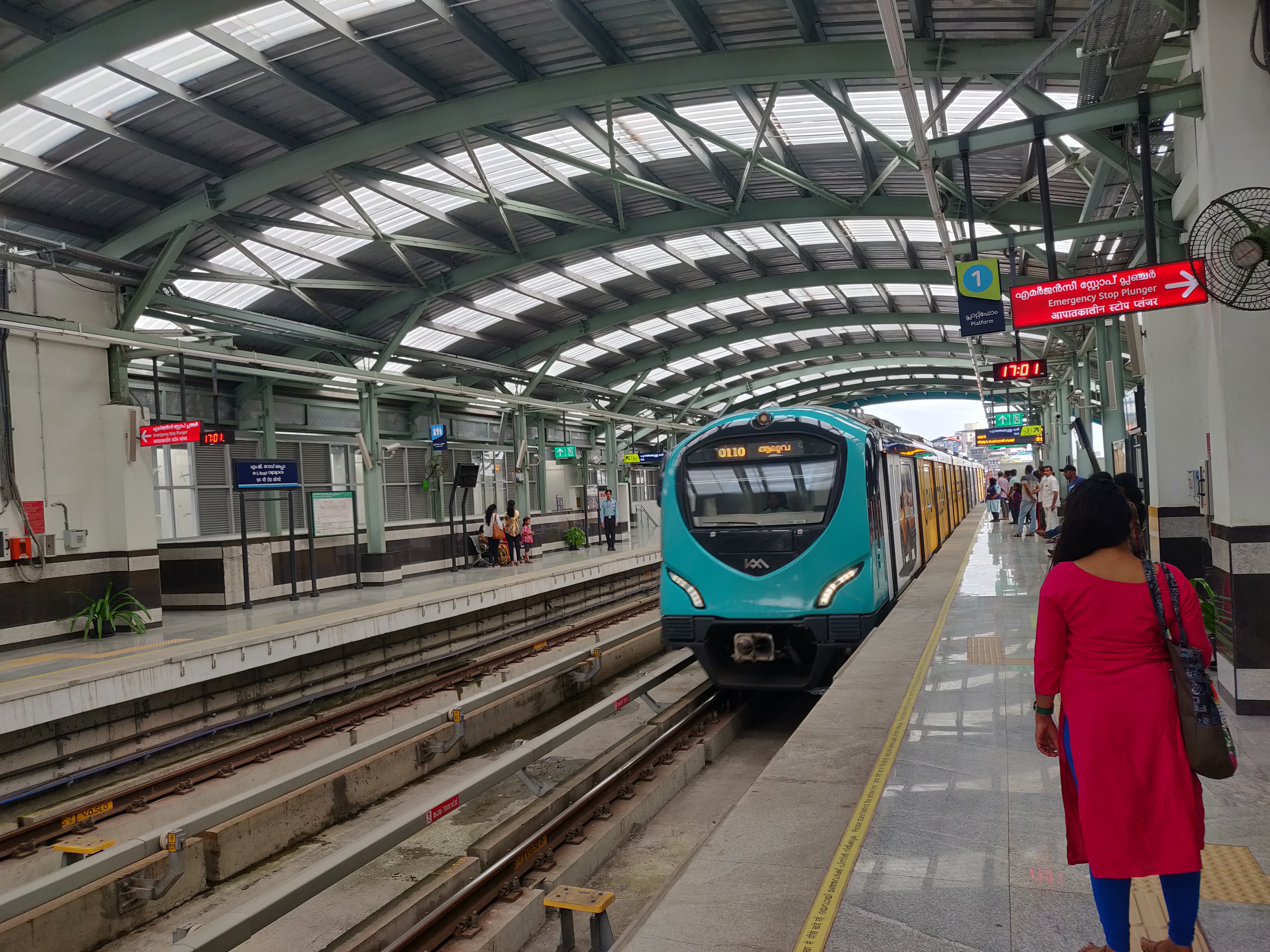
A metro rake approaching MG Road metro station

The government led by E.K. Nayanar ideated the project in 1999. The cabinet meeting held on 21 July 1999, of the then Left Democratic Front (Kerala) government, assigned Rail India Technological and Economic Services (RITES) for the feasibility study for a metro rapid transport system in Kochi. The techno-economic feasibility study for a Metro Rapid Transit System in Kochi was completed in 1999, which was begun in the same year, by Rail India Technological and Economic Services (RITES). The techno-feasibility study report was submitted to the state government in 1999.

On 22 December 2004, the United Democratic Front Government led by Oommen Chandy assigned the Delhi Metro Rail Corporation (DMRC) the task of preparing the detailed project report (DPR) for the Kochi Metro rail project. It was expected to start by 2006 and complete by 2010. But the project was delayed because the Central Government expressed serious doubts about the economic viability of the project. In 2008 LDF Government under the Chief Minister V. S. Achuthanandan approved the Kochi Metro rail project in a cabinet meeting held on 2 January 2008 and sent to Central Government for ratification.

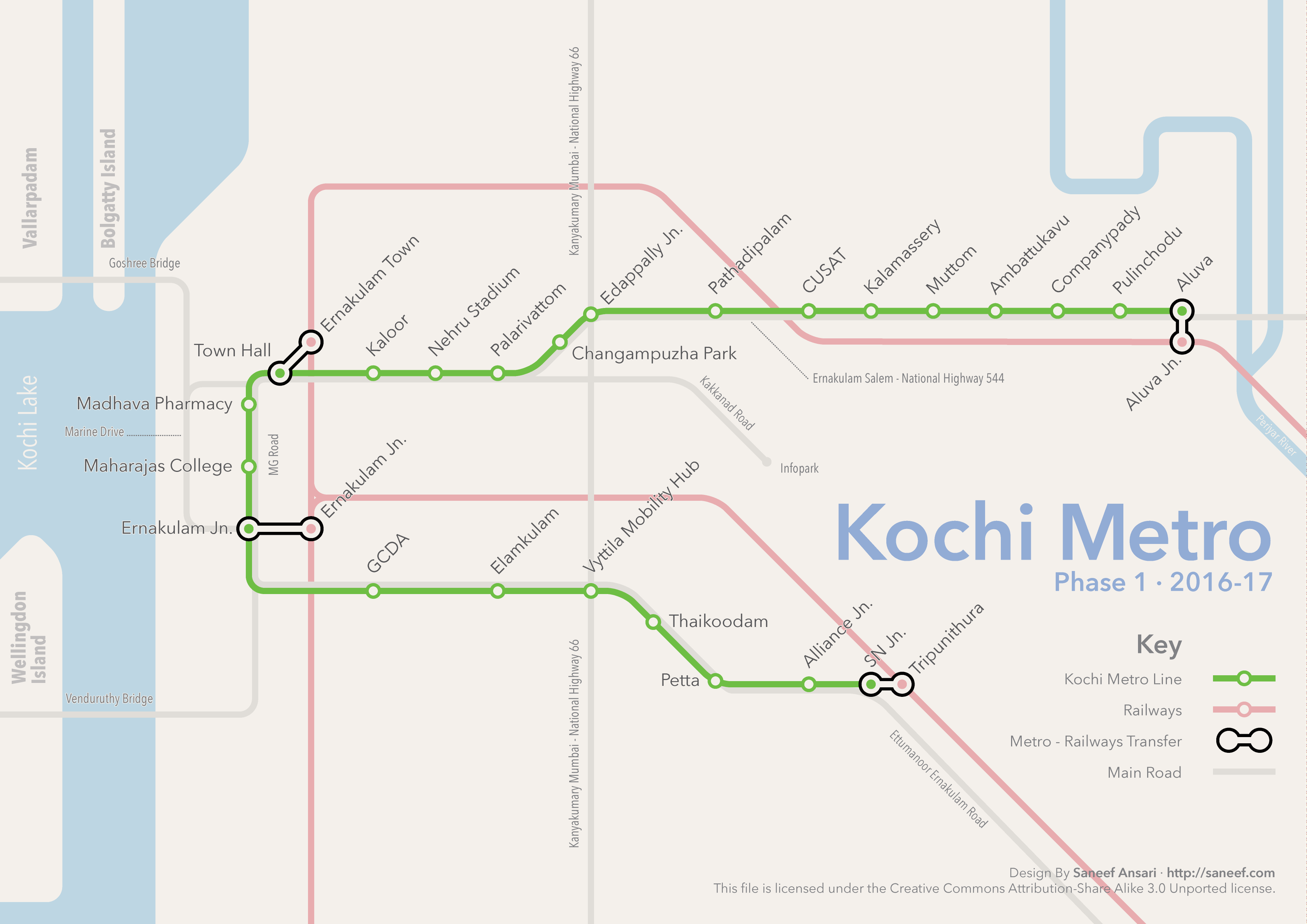
The Route Map of Phase 1 of Kochi Metro Rail Network

The Kerala government hoped the centre would approve a funding structure similar to that used for the Delhi Metro, but they were turned down. The Union Government supported using public-private partnership (PPP) on the build-operate-transfer model. The LDF state government wanted it to be in public sector, which was not convenient to the Central Government. The victory of the United Democratic Front (UDF) in the 2011 Kerala legislative assembly elections, changed the scenario in the state and it was decided that the Kochi Metro would follow the Chennai Metro and Delhi Metro models, and would be implemented on a joint venture basis, with investments by the Central and State Government. A Cabinet decision was taken to form a special purpose vehicle (SPV) called Kochi Metro Rail Limited (KMRL) as per orders from Planning Commission and the Union Government for the implementation, operation and maintenance of the metro project.

The Public Investment Board (PIB) cleared the project on 22 March 2012 subject to final approval by the Union Cabinet. The Union Government's share of the cost would be 20.26%, or ₹1,002.23 crore (US$110 million). On 28 March 2012, at a KMRL board meeting, the decision was taken to entrust the Kochi Metro rail project work to the Delhi Metro Rail Corporation (DMRC). The number of metro stations on the line was set at 22. On 3 July 2012, Union Government gave final clearance to the project. Then Managing Director of KMRL, Tom Jose said, "Now we will sit down with our valued partner, DMRC, and chalk out the way forward, obtaining advice and guidance from former DMRC Chief, E Sreedharan. We aim to complete the project within a span of 3 to 4 years."

On 14 August 2012, the state government reconstituted the Board of Directors of KMRL. Power Secretary Elias George was appointed as the new managing director, replacing Tom Jose. It is believed that Jose's differences with Sreedharan led to the decision. The then Chief Minister Oommen Chandi stated that it was part of an administrative decision. The rest of the board would include the Chief Secretary, Finance Secretary and Principal Secretary (Water Resources).

The Director Board of Kochi Metro Rail Limited entrusted MD, KMRL to find alternate funding options for the project as advised by DEA (Department of Economic Affairs). As part of it, representatives of the French Development Agency (AFD) met the KMRL team as part of their pre-appraisal mission on 18–19 March 2013. The agency had detailed discussions with KMRL MD Elias George and other senior officials. They also visited the project alignment from Aluva to Pettah to understand the project better. Mme. Aude Flogny, Regional Director, South Asia & Mr. Gautier Kohler, Project Coordinator India were there in the team. Based on the inputs received from the pre-appraisal mission team of AFD, a formal detailed- appraisal mission team visited Kochi from 25 to 27 April 2013. The team included Senior Transport Expert of AFD, Mr. Xavier Hoang; AFD regional director for South Asia, Aude Flogny and Project Coordinator, Gautier Kohler. The team inspected the project site and held discussions relating to the funding for Kochi Metro Rail project. Kochi Metro Rail Limited is hoping to get a final commitment from the French financial agency AFD – Agence Française de Développement by the end of December 2013. AFD has stated that they could provide a loan of up to 130 million Euros which is around Rs. 10 billion.

On 4 April 2013, KMRL's Director Board signed a contract with the DMRC. The 22 proposed stations for the Kochi Metro were approved by the State Cabinet on 19 June 2013.

=== Controversy over DMRC's role ===
The selection of Delhi Metro Rail Corporation as operator of the project was a source of controversy, though they were ultimately awarded the contract. Some government ministers and IAS officials alleged that Central Vigilance Commission (CVC) norms do not allow awarding of a contract to an agency which did the consultancy for a project. However, DMRC principal adviser E. Sreedharan has stated that the CVC norms would not apply in this case, as the contract is between two government agencies.

The Corporation of Kochi supported handing over work to DMRC. The metro was built by E. Sreedharan, who earlier created Delhi Metro and Konkan Railway.

=== Preparatory work and supporting activities ===
The DMRC felt that it was necessary to undertake preparatory works to avoid disruptions to commuters during the construction of the Kochi Metro. The agency suggested five preparatory works to the State government, which approved all five projects in March 2010. The preparatory works were intended to be completed before constructing the metro. The works included the widening of 3 arterial roads and the construction of a new rail over bridge (RoB) near KSRTC station and a foot over bridge. The A.L. Jacob RoB near the Ernakulam KSRTC Bus Station, commissioned on 12 May 2013, was the first of the five works to be completed. Apart from the five originally proposed projects, some additional projects such as the construction of the Ernakulam North RoB, and the flyover at Edapally were also carried out.

The work was undertaken by DMRC initially but was later undertaken by KMRL, due to a shortage of qualified personnel with the DMRC. Other projects include construction of a new RoB connecting Mullassery Canal Road and Salim Rajan Road, and the widening of the Town Hall-Madhava Pharmacy Junction stretch, and Jos Junction-South Railway Station road. The DMRC would execute all preparatory works. The State Government had set apart ₹1.58 billion for preliminary works. On 3 March 2012, KMRL handed over ₹150 million to DMRC for undertaking the preparatory works. The DMRC had been given ₹230 million earlier.

=== Flyover at Edappally ===
KMRL and the Kerala Public Works Department (PWD) signed an agreement on 22 July 2013, to build a ₹108 crore (equivalent to ₹169 crore or US$18 million in 2026) flyover at Edapally to reduce the congestion at the junction of the erstwhile NH 47 and NH 17 (now NH 544 and NH 66) at Edappally.

Education minister C Raveendranath inaugurated the 433-meter long flyover on 11 September 2016. It is supported by Twenty-four piers with 90 piles. The estimated cost of building the structure was ₹108 crore (equivalent to ₹169 crore or US$18 million in 2026), however, the total expenditure was ₹178 crore (equivalent to ₹279 crore or US$30 million in 2026), which included costs for land acquisition and construction.

=== Pachalam railway over bridge ===
On 21 February 2014, the Kerala High Court expressed its displeasure over the failure of the Kochi Corporation to finalise the final alignment of the proposed rail over bridge (ROB) at Pachalam submitted by the Roads and Bridges Development Corporation. The Division Bench comprising Chief Justice Manjula Chellur and Justice A.M. Shafeeque directed the corporation to place on record the final alignment of the ROB by 2 April 2014. The Bench observed that the civic body had "not moved an inch", after the discussion on the alignment submitted by the Roads and Bridges Development Corporation in 2011.

The Pachalam RoB was approved in-principle by the Kochi Corporation on 10 February 2014. The RoB received approval from the State Cabinet on 26 February. The 2-lane, 10-metre wide RoB, estimated to cost ₹52 crore (US$5.6 million) was constructed by the DMRC in 2015. About 52 cents of land will be acquired for the project.

=== Shifting Vyttila station ===
Based on suggestions from Centre for Public Policy Research (CPPR), Kochi, Kochi Metro Rail Limited decided to shift Vyttila station to Vyttila Mobility Hub to follow the guidelines of the Ministry of Urban Development so that the station could also provide bus and water transport. Long-distance buses operate out of Vyttila hub and the hub authorities are planning to build a new boat jetty there as the part of their second phase of development. Thus, Kochi metro project became the first metro in the country which connects rail, road and water transport facilities.

=== Land acquisition ===
The total amount of land required for the project is 40.409 hectares. The total land required for all stations is 9.3941 hectares, including area required for parking lots. Aluva, Pettah, Kalamassery, Edappally and Kaloor stations would have larger parking areas requiring about 2.7869 hectares of land. The coach depot at Muttom requires 23.605 hectares of land, higher than the originally estimated 17 hectares. Approximately, 4.6 hectares of land would be required for widening curves and stretches where the metro's viaduct is positioned outside the median. Apart from the above, 102.50 cents of land was required for preparatory works, and 94 hectares in Muttom and 20 hectares of land in Kakkanad for developing the land for commercial use.

The original plan was to acquire about 31.9217 hectares of land in Ernakulam, Elamkulam, Poonithura, Thrikkakara North, Edappally South and Aluva West. Out of this approximately, 17 hectares was for the Muttom coach maintenance depot. The remaining land was required for the construction of metro stations. Approximately, 15 hectares out of the required 31.92 was government-owned land. However, the land required for parking at stations, road widening and straightening curves along the alignment was not assessed in the original plan. The addition of parking lots increased the amount of land required by 8.4874 hectares.

The district-level purchase committee fixed the maximum compensation for land acquisition at ₹ 5.2 million percent for the land to be acquired for preparatory works. The district administration can take ownership of land only after paying at least 80% of the price. Land acquisition for a foot overbridge near the KSRTC main depot would cost ₹ 2.8 million percent and land for the approach road of the Ponnurunni railway overbridge would be acquired at ₹ 1850,000 percent. The prices were approved by the State Empowered Committee. The total estimated cost of land acquisition is ₹ 11.10 billion, higher than the ₹ 6.72 billion estimated as per the original plan.

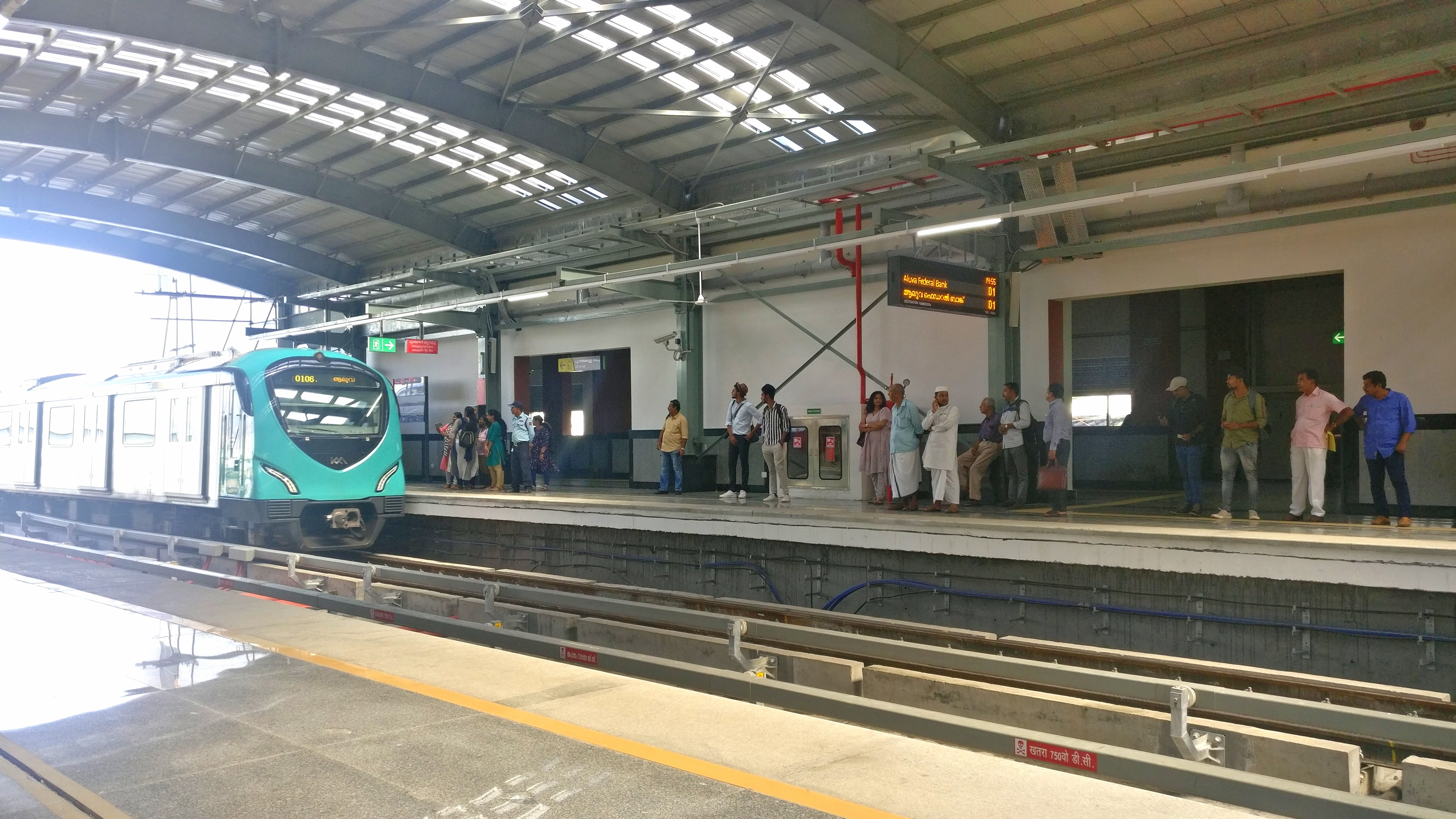
A metro train at Ernakulam South station

The Kadavanthra station was built on the land which housed GCDA's Nandanam park near the canal. Part of the land required was obtained from the Greater Cochin Development Authority on 13 February 2014. The remaining land was owned by the KSEB and was acquired separately.

When the Railways demanded ₹ 3 billion for a 35-year lease of 4,360 square metres (46,931 sq ft) of land intended as the location of Ernakulam South metro station and other facilities, KMRL officials rejected the offer, as ₹ 3 billion worked out to about 8% of the metro project's total cost. The station was instead built on land owned by the Kochi Corporation near Ernakulam Girls' High School, while the Operations Control Centre was built in Muttom. The cost for the station was ₹100 million.

== Construction Phases ==
=== Phase 1: Aluva to Petta ===
Former Prime Minister Manmohan Singh laid the foundation stone for the project on 13 September 2012. Construction work on the Kochi Metro rail project began on 7 June 2013, with the piling works for the viaducts near Changampuzha Park, after an official launch ceremony held at the Jawaharlal Nehru Stadium at 10:30 am on the same day. At the inauguration ceremony, the State Government announced that the metro would be extended a kilometre-and-a-half from Pettah to Tripunithura, Construction work on Metro' first station, at Kaloor, began at 10:30 am IST on 30 September 2013, when Soma Constructions began piling. The next station where piling work was carried out was Aluva.

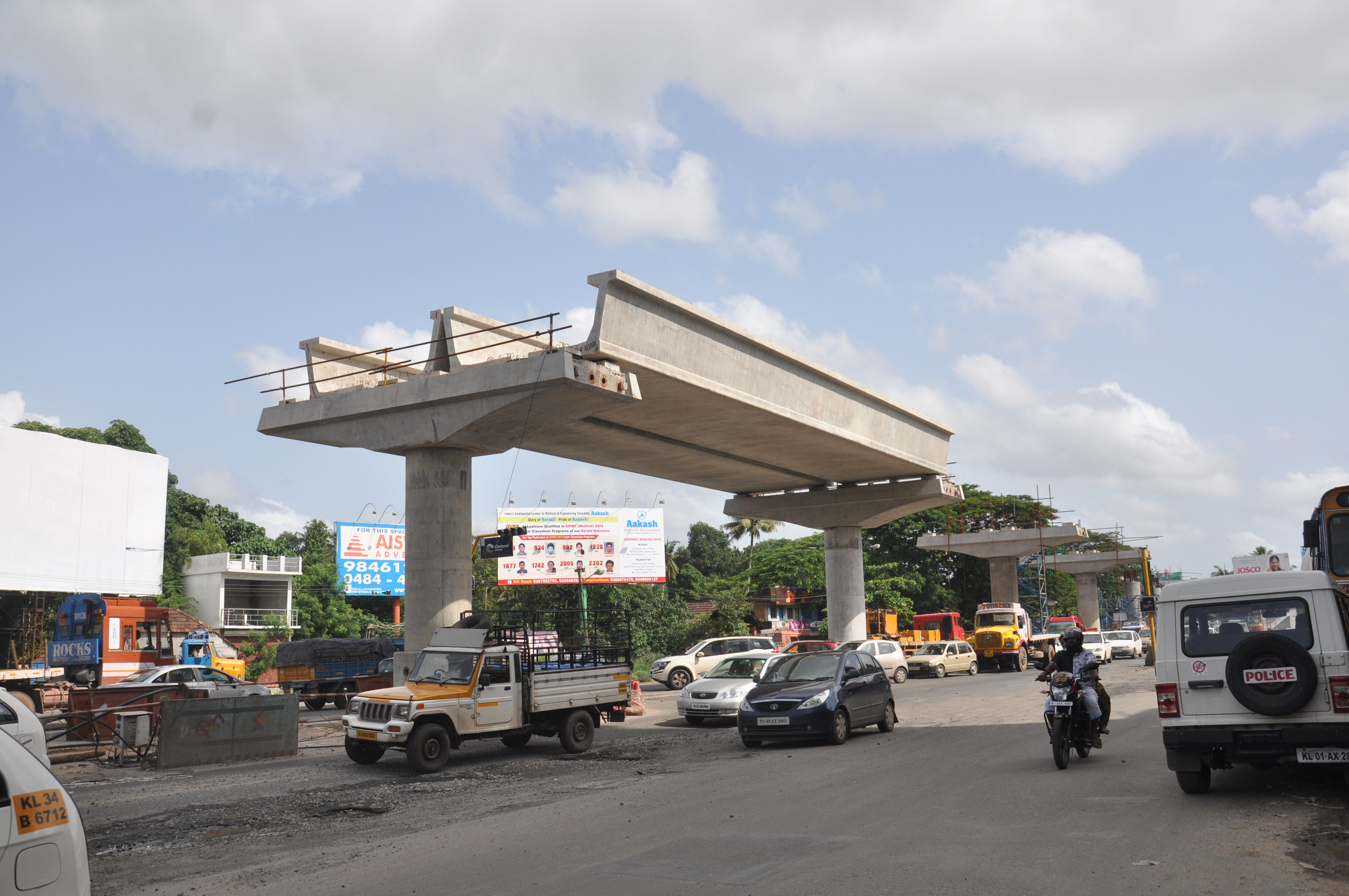
Viaduct under construction at Kalamassery

Several companies (Era Infra Engineering, Larsen & Toubro, Cherian Varkey Construction Company-RDS, SP Singla Constructions and Soma Constructions) were contracted to build viaducts and stations. Larsen and Toubro (L&T) was awarded the contract to construct the viaduct and 6 stations on the Kalamassery-Stadium stretch in April 2013 at an estimated cost of ₹4 billion (US$43 million). Cherian Varkey Constructions-RDS(CVCC-RDS JV) were awarded the work for the demolition of the existing ROB and rebuilding of the north over bridge into a 4 lane road with metro viaducts.

About 450,000 to 500,000 square metres (4,843,760 to 5,381,955 sq ft) of sand was required for construction of the metro. KMRL has set up a vertical garden on every sixth pillar along the metro rail system.

The first U-shaped concrete girder of the Kochi Metro Rail was successfully installed on Saturday, 12 July 2014 early morning. The girder was installed at Pulinchode near Aluva. The ‘U- shaped’ girder was cast at the Metro Casting Yard at Kalamassery. It was transported from the yard around 7 pm on Friday with the help of two huge cranes and special trailers brought from Mumbai. The girder reached the site at midnight and was installed with the help of cranes having capacities of 350 tonnes and 400 tonnes.

The first trial run was flagged off by Chief Minister Oommen Chandy, on 23 January 2016. The three-car train set successfully completed the trial run. The first test run of the Kochi metro was conducted on 27 February 2016 on a 1 km (0.62 mi) section between Muttom Yard depot and Kalamassery at speeds of up to 10 km/h (6.2 mph). On 28 March, he unveiled the logo of the metro service at CIAL. The logo was reveled to resemble the malayalam letter 'ക' and the letter 'K' in a vibrant yellow. A sylised letter 'M' was also incorporated, with it changing colors to represent future metro lines and KMRL-associated services. He also declared the arrival of the first rake from Sri City within the next three months, after which the metro system would commence testing.

The Research Designs and Standards Organization (RDSO) cleared the metro to operate at a maximum speed of 80 km/h (50 mph) on 8 December 2016. On 8 May 2017, Kochi Metro was given the final approval to start service. The 5 km (3.1 mi) line from Palarivattom to Maharaja's College metro station was inaugurated on 3 October 2017.

In July 2017, a consortium of Cherian Varkey Construction Company (CVCC) and Vijay Nirman Constructions (VNC) were given the contract to execute the construction works from Maharaja's College to Pettah. The 5.65 km (3.51 mi) line from Maharaja's College Stadium to Thaikoodam was inaugurated on 3 September 2019 by Chief Minister Pinarayi Vijayan and Union Minister for Housing and Urban Affairs, Hardeep Singh Puri.

==== Phase 1 extensions: 1A and 1B ====
KMRL approved the extension of the metro to Tripunithura on 27 January 2014. Speaking to the media after the meeting, Union Urban Development Secretary and KMRL chairman Sudhir Krishna announced that the 2 km (1.2 mi) extension would cost an additional ₹3.23 billion (US$35 million). The State Cabinet approved the Tripunithura extension on 5 March 2014, based on the preliminary RITES report. The extension added two more stations, near Vadakkekotta and SN Junction, to the line. The construction of the final Thrippunithura station of Phase I was completed in December 2023 and was inaugurated on 6 March 2024, making the first phase of the Kochi Metro fully operational.

Phase 1 network (includes Ph 1A & 1B)
No.	Line name	Terminals		Stations	Distance (km)	Opening date
1	Blue Line	Aluva	Palarivattom	11	9.63 km (5.98 mi)	17 June 2017
1	Blue Line	Palarivattom	Maharaja’s College	5	2.35 km (1.46 mi)	3 October 2017
1	Blue Line	Maharaja’s College	Thykoodam	5	3.41 km (2.12 mi)	3 September 2019
1	Blue Line	Thykoodam	Petta	1	1.35 km (0.84 mi)	7 September 2020
1	Blue Line	Petta	SN Junction	2	1.35 km (0.84 mi)	1 September 2022
1	Blue Line	SN Junction	Thrippunithura	1	1.35 km (0.84 mi)	6 March 2024
Total				25	25.61 km (15.91 mi)	

=== Phase 2: Kakkanad Infopark extension ===
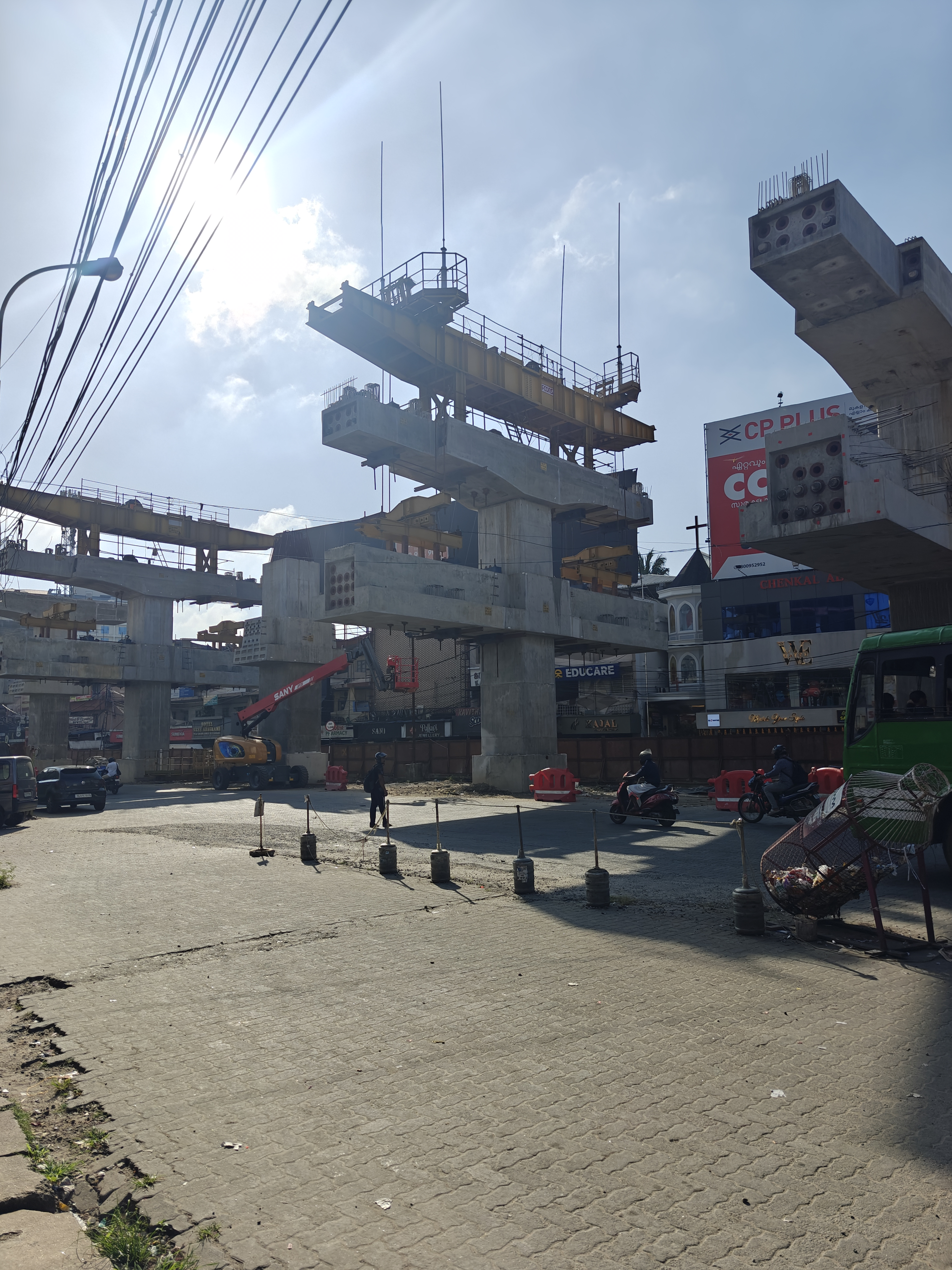
Phase 2 under construction at Palarivattom

In November 2016, KMRL began the land acquisition process for an extension of the metro up to Infopark. KMRL would widen the Kakkanad-Airport corridor to a 22-metre-wide stretch, and construct metro pillars in the centre of the stretch. Palarivattom Junction, Palarivattom Bypass Junction and Collectorate Junction would also be widened. The 11.2 km (7.0 mi) extension will link Jawaharlal Nehru International Stadium to Infopark via Kakkanad, and the estimated cost at the time of proposal was ₹2,024 crore (US$220 million). Ernakulam District Collector K. Mohammed Y. Safirulla stated in March 2017, that the land evaluation process for the project had been completed.

The State Cabinet approved Phase II of the Kochi Metro on 17 May 2017. Unlike Phase I, the KMRL is implementing Phase II independently without the involvement of the DMRC. Phase II comprises a 11.2 km (7.0 mi) line from Jawaharlal Nehru International Stadium to Infopark via Kakkanad. There would be 11 stations on the line – Palarivattom Junction, Palarivattom Signal, Chembumukku, Vazhakkala, Kunnumpuram, Kakkanad Junction, Kochi Special Economic Zone, Chittethukara, Rajagiri, InfoPark I and InfoPark II.

The foundation stone of the Phase II of Kochi Metro was laid by the Prime Minister Narendra Modi on 1 September 2022. In September 2023, it was announced that the Phase II stretch will be known as the Pink Line. The Kerala government approved funding of ₹378 crore (US$40 million) for the second phase on 4 December 2023. The commissioning of the Pink Line is expected by 2027. The construction of the Kochi Metro Phase II began on 3 July 2024. Beijing-based Asian Infrastructure Investment Bank (AIIB) has granted financial assistance for Phase II line. However, the project is moving at a slow pace as the state government has not sent a request for approval from the central government, as it may add it to the accounts of state and not be adequately compensating. The government approved AIIB funding in February 2026, cancelling a proposed agreement with the French Development Agency. This will enable Afcons India, the prime contractor for construction to complete and open the full stretch of the corridor within 20 months.

It was expected that the work be undertaken in two phases, with the first five stations on the Pink-line being ready for service by June 30, 2026, and the remaining by December 2026. The project received further delays of due to Pipeline work and torrential rain on the route. The dates were again postponed, with KMRL citing land acquisition for the stations as the cause for delay. KMRL is negotiating with the KSEB and KWA for constructing around an Underground electrical line and an overhead electric line near Infopark stations, and the re-alignment of a major underground water pipe near JLN stadium.

On 29 August 2025, the first Pier Cap for the Pink line was installed of pillar number 281 near Kochi Infopark. The first U-grider was installed on 24 October 2025. The construction of 1,601 of the 2,028 piles, 221 of the 470 piers and 100 of the 488 U griders were completed by March 2026. Jindal Steel started supplying the steel for the Railway tracks from their Raigad plant by September 2026.

Phase 2 network
No.	Line name	Terminals		Stations	Distance (km)	Opening date
2	Pink Line	JLN Stadium	Kakkanad Infopark	11	11.2	Under construction

=== Phase 3: Airport & Angamaly extension ===
The third phase of Kochi Metro from Aluva to Angamaly is expected to be around 16 km including connectivity with Cochin International Airport. The airport authority had requested that the State Government build the metro link in the second phase, but the government decided to take it up in the third phase instead. The route will start from Aluva following NH 544, turning in Kariyad and Akaparambu to reach the airport, and then proceeding to Angamaly via Angamaly-Airport Road and MC Road, stopping at NH 544 2 km from Angamaly. It was also reported that KMRL will conduct a feasibility study for the metro line be extended to Ayyampuzha in the Third phase. There has also been popular demands for and an extension to Karayamparambu with a final termination at Karukutty.

The airport station is planned to be developed into a transit hub, connecting the Cochin Airport when Metro, Water Metro and railway services at the proposed Nedumbassery railway station.The phase is expected to cost over ₹8,000 crore and enable the Integrated Metro system to carry over 1.2 lakh passengers every year. On 1 September 2026, KMRL submitted the DPR for phase III. Under this plan, the Metro line begins as an elevated structure from Aluva along NH 544 until Kariyad. It then shifts into a vital 3km underground tunnel to establish a direct link to Cochin International Airport, featuring an underground terminal station. After the airport, the route returns to an elevated pathway that runs through Nayathode, Kavaraparambu, and Arikkal Junction, ultimately concluding at Karayamparambu in Angamaly town.

Phase 3 network
No.	Line name	Terminals		Stations	Distance (km)	Opening date
1	Blue Line	Aluva	Angamaly	14	17.5	DPR Submitted

=== Feasibility Study for Light Trams ===
In future, KMRL plans to construct and operate light trams on the 6.2 km MG Road-Menaka-Park Avenue Road-Jos Junction-Thevara loop line corridor. KMRL held discussions with HESS Green Mobility, who were conducting the feasibility study.

== Lines ==
=== Blue Line ===
The Blue Line is Kochi Metro's operational corridor, running from Aluva to Tripunithura Terminal over a distance of 28.125 kilometres (17.476 mi) with 25 stations. The corridor was completed with the inauguration of Tripunithura Terminal on 6 March 2024. Its first section, between Aluva and Palarivattom, was inaugurated on 17 June 2017 and opened for passenger services on 19 June 2017. This initial section covered approximately 13.26 kilometres and served 11 stations. The corridor was subsequently extended southwards, with the extensions beyond Petta implemented as Phase IA and Phase IB. The 1.8-kilometre Phase IA section from Petta to SN Junction, comprising two additional stations, opened on 1 September 2022. Phase IB added a further 1.2 kilometres from SN Junction to Tripunithura Terminal.

=== Pink Line ===
The Pink Line is the second corridor of Kochi Metro and is being constructed as Phase II of the network. It will run from Jawaharlal Nehru Stadium to Infopark via Kakkanad, covering approximately 11.2 kilometres (7.0 mi) with 11 stations. The Union Cabinet approved the project at an estimated cost of ₹1,957.05 crore; the approved project length was 11.17 kilometres. The corridor is intended to improve access to the district administrative centre at Kakkanad and employment centres including the Cochin Special Economic Zone, Infopark and SmartCity. Construction has experienced delays associated with funding, and in May 2026 KMRL revised its commissioning target to April 2027. At that time, civil and electrical works were scheduled for completion by December 2026, followed by testing before passenger services could begin.

== Network ==
Kochi Metro
No.	Line Name	Terminal		Stations	Length	First Operational	Last Extension
1	Blue Line	Aluva	Tripunithura Terminal	25	28.12 km (17.47 mi)	19 June 2017	6 March 2024
Total				25	28.12 km (17.47 mi)		

== Finances ==
=== Funding and revenue ===
The original cost of the Kochi Metro project was ₹51.46 billion (US$550 million), but this later increased to ₹55.373 billion (US$590 million). Taxes on the project will come to about ₹2.373 billion (US$25 million) which will be borne by the Kerala Government along with any escalations. The total estimated cost of land acquisition is ₹11.1 billion (US$120 million), higher than the ₹6.72 billion (US$72 million) estimated as per the original plan. The total external borrowing requirement for the metro rail project is nearly ₹21.7 billion (US$230 million).

On 4 November 2013, the KMRL director board approved an offer from Canara Bank to provide it with a loan of ₹11.7 billion (equivalent to ₹22 billion or US$230 million in 2026). KMRL also signed an agreement with French financial aid agency Agence Française de Développement (AFD) on 8 February 2014, to provide a ₹152 crore (equivalent to ₹265 crore, US$28 million or €25 million in 2026) loan for the project. The AFD loan is for a period of 25 years at the rate of 2% interest. The period is composed of a 20-year repayment period and a five-year grace period. The total debt component from Canara Bank and AFD amounted to INR 21.70 billion. The centre and state governments contributed ₹7.53 billion (US$80 million) each as equity share for the project. The line is expected to break even in 2023.

KMRL signed a term loan agreement for Rs 1,170 crore with Canara Bank on 20 July 2014. The Metro authority said that Canara Bank has taken this project as a special case with their request of interest reduction and provided relaxations on their conditions.

In November 2016, the AFD agreed to provide a loan of EUR 175 million to the KMRL for the 11.2 km (7.0 mi) extension of the metro from JLN Stadium to Infopark via Kakkanad. Although the AFD typically issues 20-year loans for urban infrastructure projects, it agreed to offer KMRL a longer tenure of 25 years at an interest rate of 1.35%. EUR 22 million will be utilized to carry out works related to non-motorised transportation at 20 stations, pedestrianization of MG Road, and junction development at Aluva, Edappally and Vyttila. The extension is estimated to cost ₹2,024 crore (US$220 million).

=== Revenues ===
Apart from ticket sales, the KMRL generates revenue through advertising and leasing out station names. Advertisements are placed at metro stations, pillars along the viaduct, the interior/exterior of trains and the KMRL website. The metro system would also create links between metro stations and nearby commercial establishments if the establishments pay a fee. Kochi Metro has also encouraged bidding for the naming rights of selected stations. The station near Lissie Hospital was earlier named after the hospital, after they won the naming rights for the station. It was then renamed to Town Hall Metro Station on 1 February 2020. Similarly, OPPO bagged the naming rights for Edapally and MG Road stations. Hence, the stations are named Edapally OPPO and MG Road OPPO respectively.

The Indian Institute of Management, Bengaluru (IIMB) estimated that Kochi Metro could break even within 8 years of operation, assuming that the estimated ridership in the DPR is achieved. Kochi Metro achieved its first-ever operating profit after six years of operation in the 2022-23 fiscal year, with a 145 per cent increase in revenue. Since then, it has been reporting increasing operating profits year-over-year and has achieved an operating profit of ₹33.34 crore (US$3.6 million) on a revenue of ₹182.37 crore (US$19 million) in the 2024-25 fiscal year.

== Infrastructure ==
=== Stations ===
KMRL has an elevated route spanning 25 km (16 mi) from Aluva to Tripunithura Terminal with 26 stations. All platforms are 70 metres (230 ft) long. There are 17 sharp curves along the route; the sharpest curve has a radius of 120 metres (390 ft).

==== List ====
#	Stations name		Chainage (km)	Connections	Platform type	Alignment description
#	English	Malayalam	Chainage (km)	Connections	Platform type	Alignment description
1	Aluva	ആലുവ	0.098	None	Side	On 1000 metres curve
2	Pulinchodu	പുളിഞ്ചോട്	1.827	None	Side	Curved
3	Companypady	കമ്പനിപ്പടി	2.796	None	Side	Straight
4	Ambattukavu	അമ്പാട്ടുകാവ്	3.779	None	Side	Straight
5	Muttom	മുട്ടം	4.716	None	Side & Island	Straight Curved
6	Kalamassery	കളമശ്ശേരി	6.768	None	Side	Straight
7	Cochin University	കൊച്ചിൻ യൂണിവേഴ്‌സിറ്റി	8.147	None	Side	Straight
8	Pathadipalam	പത്തടിപ്പാലം	9.394	None	Side	Straight
9	Edapally	ഇടപ്പള്ളി	10.787	None	Side	Straight
10	Changampuzha Park	ചങ്ങമ്പുഴ പാർക്ക്	12.088	None	Side	Straight
11	Palarivatom	പാലാരിവട്ടം	13.096	None	Side	Straight
12	J. L. N. Stadium	ജെ. എൽ. എൻ സ്റ്റേഡിയം	14.217	None	Side	Straight
13	Kaloor	കലൂർ	15.250	None	Side	Straight
14	Town Hall	ടൗണ്‍ ഹാൾ	15.723	Ernakulam Town	Side	Curved
15	M. G. Road	എം. ജി റോഡ്‌	16.926	None	Side	Straight
16	Maharaja's College	മഹാരാജാസ് കോളേജ്	18.100	None	Side	Straight
17	Ernakulam South	എറണാകുളം സൗത്ത്	18.956	Ernakulam Junction	Side	Straight
18	Kadavanthra	കടവന്ത്ര	20.141	None	Side	Straight
19	Elamkulam	എളംകുളം	21.295	None	Side	Straight
20	Vyttila	വൈറ്റില	22.734	Vyttila	Side	Straight
21	Thaikoodam	തൈക്കൂടം	23.758	None	Side	Straight
22	Pettah	പേട്ട	24.941	None	Side	Straight
23	Vadakkekotta	വടക്കേക്കോട്ട		None	Side	Straight
24	SN Junction	എസ്.എൻ ജംഗ്ഷൻ		None	Side	Straight
25	Tripunithura Terminal	തൃപ്പൂണിത്തുറ ടെർമിനൽ		Tripunithura	Side	Straight

=== Design ===
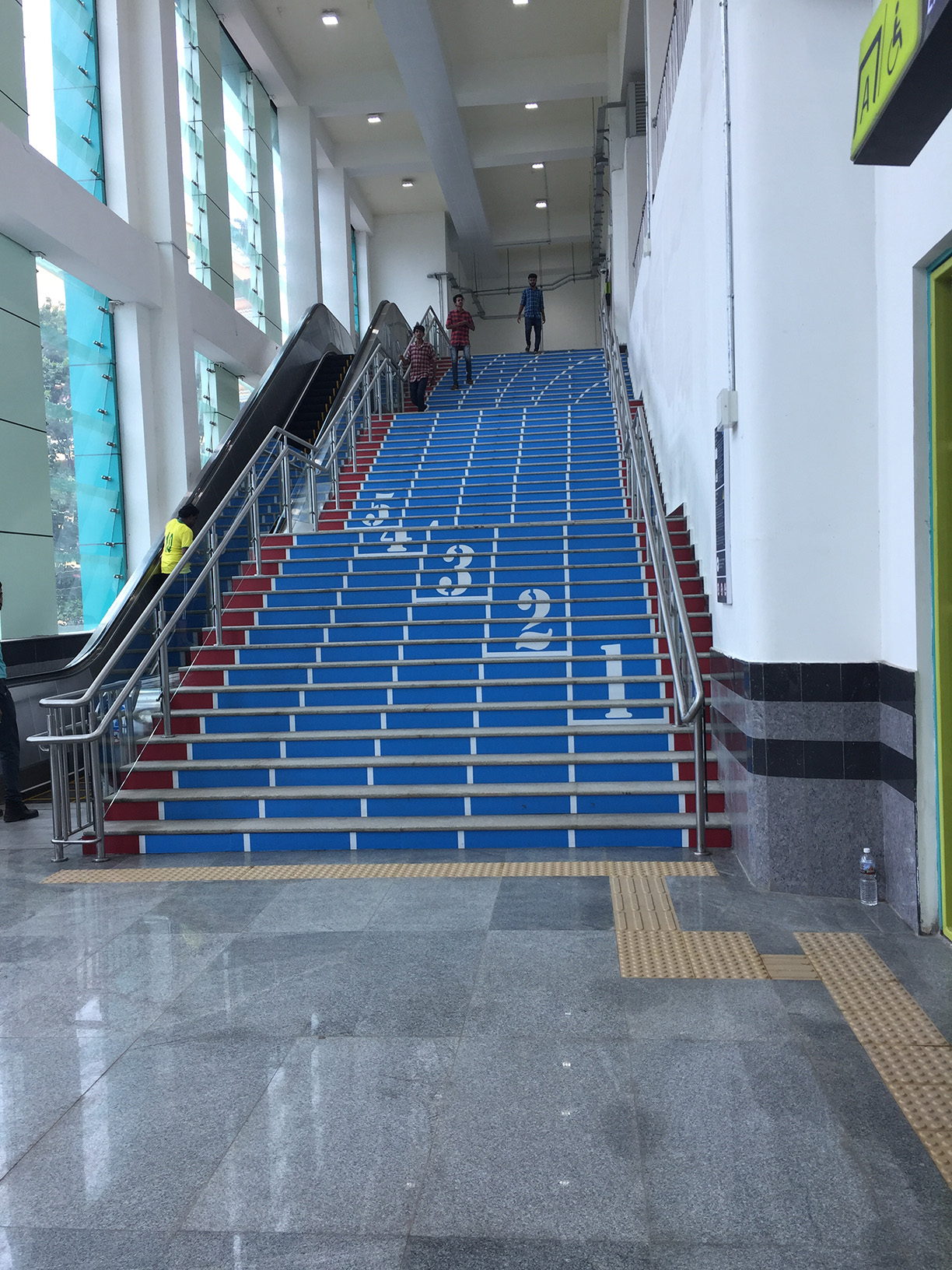
The JLN Stadium Station at Kaloor is sports themed

Egis India was responsible for the design of the stations such as floors and doors, and the Indian Institute of Architecture (Kochi Chapter) developed the designs of the roof and the interior of the stations. The IIA presented the designs of 14 stations to the KMRL on 14–15 March 2014.

The interiors and exteriors of the Kochi Metro stations are decorated with references to local culture. However, the traditional nālukettu architectural style was not structurally feasible. According to a KMRL official, "It [stations] will be designed in such a way that it reflects the Kerala style of architecture with each of the 22 stations reflecting a regional theme. ... the stations will reflect an independent adaptation of the state's culture to give it a distinct look". KMRL officials stated, "Our effort is to highlight the uniqueness of the state, especially to outsiders, but the station buildings won't be an exact replica of the Kerala model of architecture. The station designs are contemporary but inspired by socio-cultural themes. The kettuvalam or houseboat, for example, widely used in the backwaters of the state, is the theme of one of the stations, bearing descriptions of how it is made with a model exhibited alongside."

The Western Ghats that run along most of the Kerala-Tamil Nadu border forms a common design theme at all the stations. The design of each individual station is a variation on this common theme. Aluva station's theme is Kerala's natural beauty and the station's interiors depict the Periyar and the other major rivers in the state. The walls of the Pulinchodu station feature flora and fauna of the Western Ghats. Kalamassery station depicts rare species of the mountain range. The theme of CUSAT station is the state's maritime history, and that of Pathadipalam station is the fish of the Western Ghats. Spices of Kerala is the theme of the Edapally station, while the cultural and artistic heritage of Kerala forms the theme of the Changampuzha Park station. Palarivattom station features images of the flowers of the Western Ghats. The Jawaharlal Nehru Stadium station will depict the heritage of sports in the state. The monsoon season forms the theme of the Kaloor station. Endangered species and animals of Western Ghats are depicted in MG Road station, and the history and trade routes of Kochi are the theme of the Maharaja's College station.

A similar theme has been adopted by all stations of the Phase-II extension. The Palarivattom Junction station would focus on the legacy of the state's Cartoonists, Chembumukkku would be designed around Kerala's musical instruments and Vazakkala will be about the Lampmaking industry of Kerala. Padumugal station would focus on the traditional Coir industry while the Cochin SEZ station would be about the Ornaments and jewellery of the state. Chitteukara would focus on Kerala's Snake-boat races while KINFRA park staion would incoporate elements of the Malayali martial art Kalaripayattu into its design. The Infopark and Kochi Smartcity stations would focus on the traditional dances of Kerala, namely Kathakali and Theyyam.

Stations were designed to provide the maximum natural ventilation in passenger areas. All stations utilize LED lighting and have water efficient fittings in toilets. Some stations also provide facilities for rainwater harvesting. A three-second tune composed by Bijibal will be played whenever train doors open or close at stations. The tune features traditional sounds of Kerala music featuring a chenda and ilathalam. KMRL chose to play the tune instead of the typical chime played on other metros in the country in order to give "Malayali flavour" to the metro system.

=== Rolling stock ===
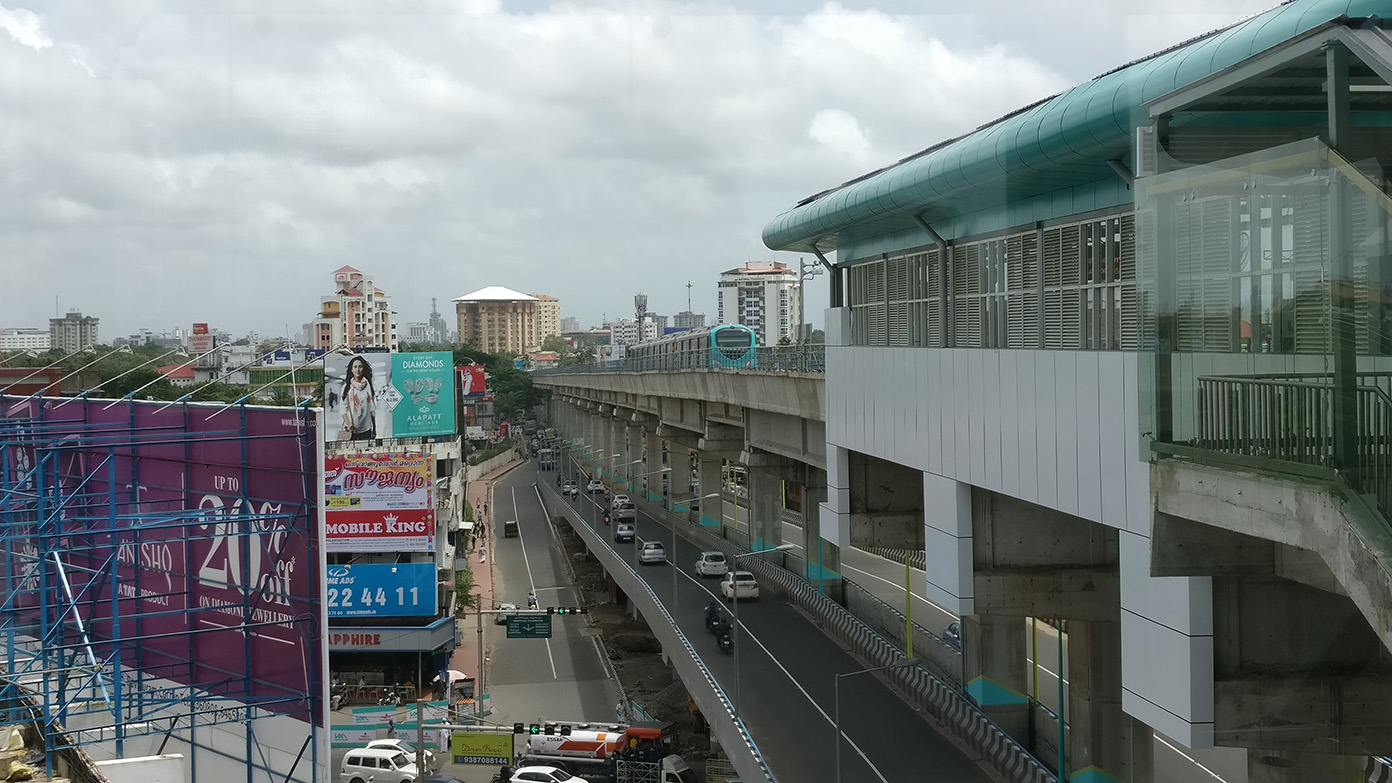
A train leaving Edapally Station

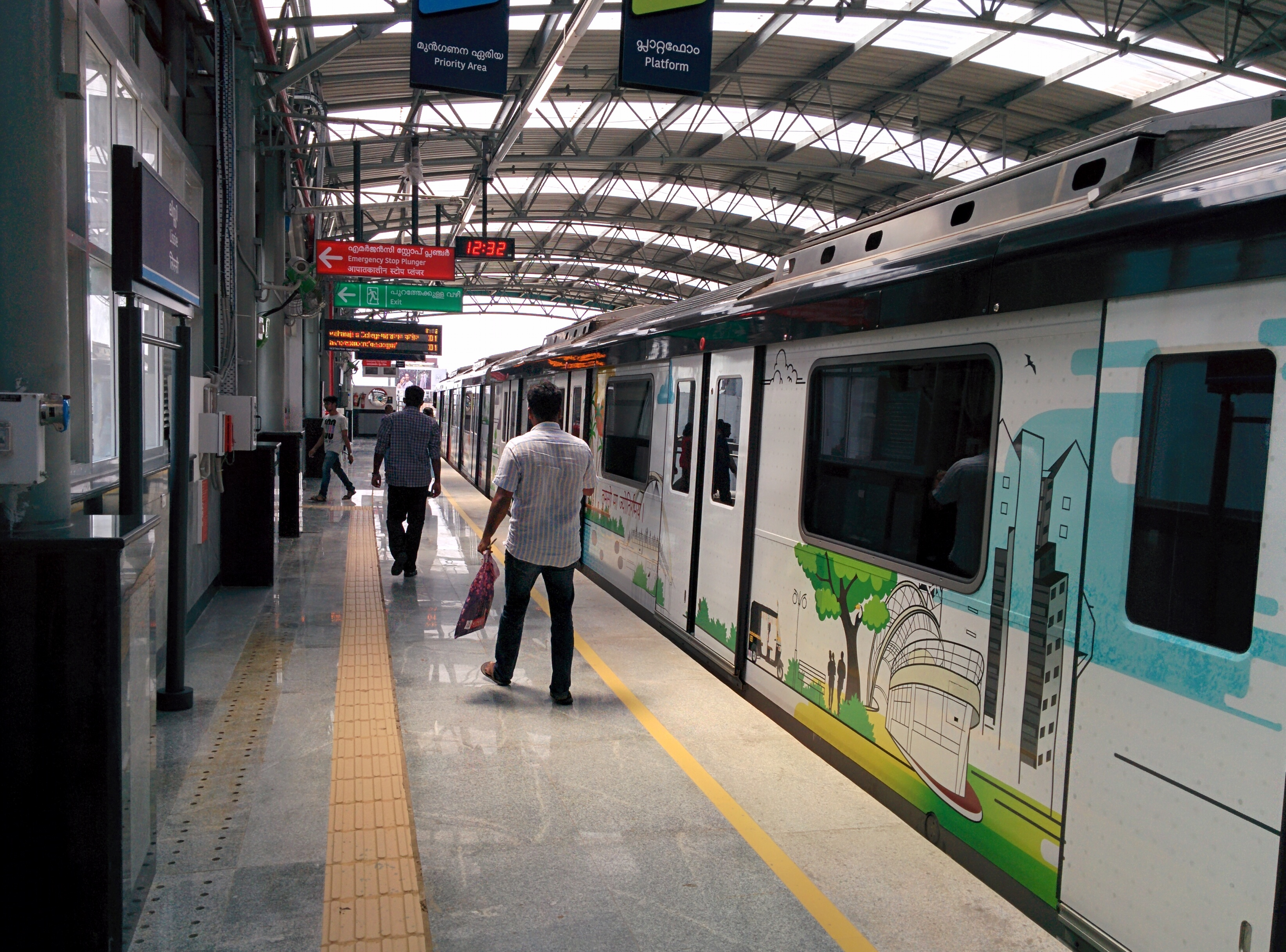
Train at Town Hall Station

The Kochi Metro uses 65-metre long Metropolis train sets built and designed by Alstom. Coaches are to be 3.90 metres (12.8 ft) tall, and each train of three coaches will be 65 metres (213 ft) in length. Each coach will have three wide doors, with automatic door closing and opening. The platforms at each station will be 70 metres (230 ft) long, and will have half platform screen doors. A total of 22 trains will be inducted for the first phase of operations of the metro. The axle load is 15 t (15 long tons; 17 short tons) for which the structures are to be designed. The capacity of each train is 975 passengers. The trains are equipped with free WiFi service.

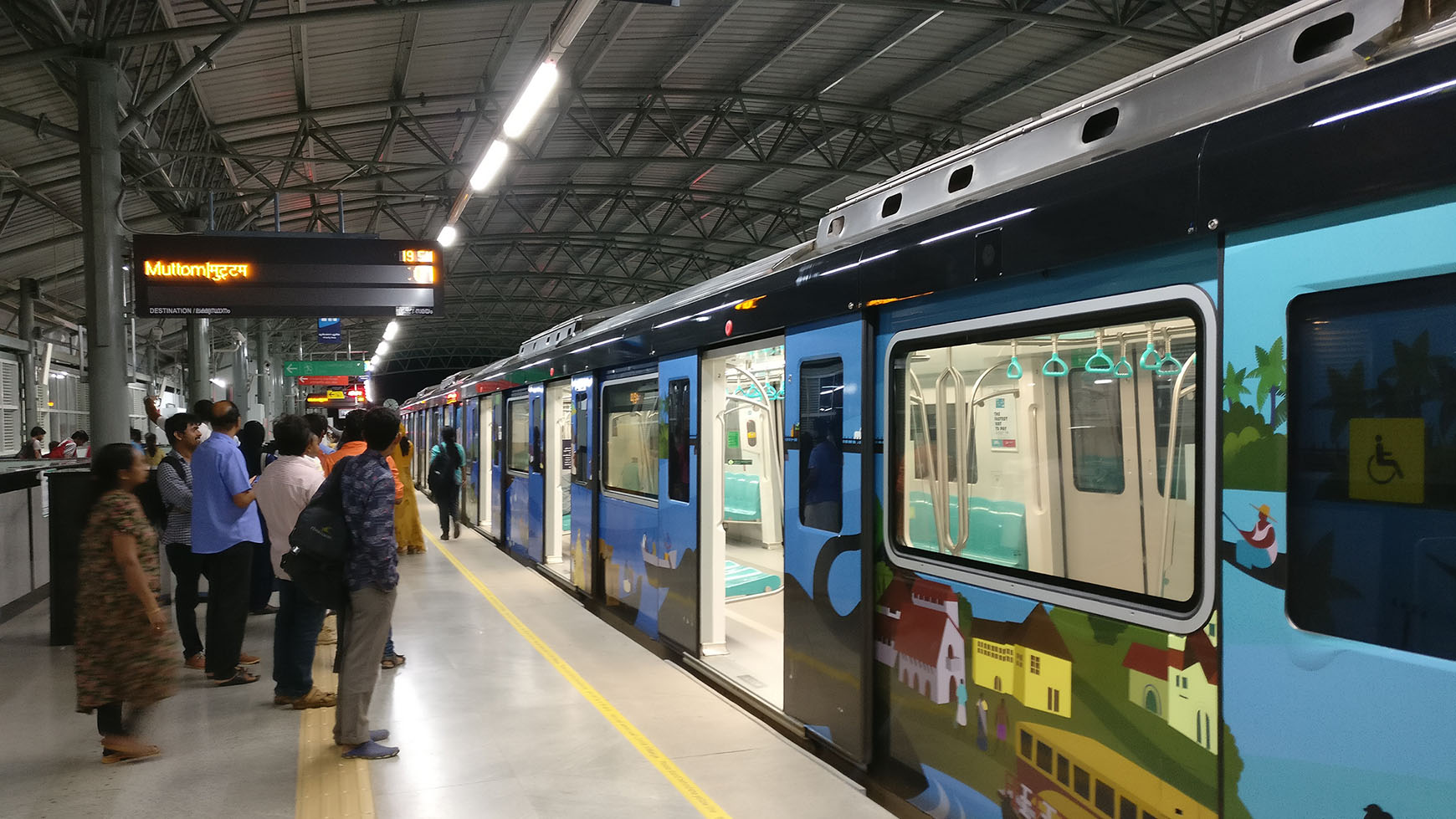
Train halted at Aluva Station

It was initially proposed to use maglev trains from South Korea for Kochi Metro. It was later decided that Kochi Metro will run on standard gauge, with 3 coaches initially in each train, which can be extended to six coaches in future. The width of each coach was initially fixed at 2.70 metres (8 ft 10 in) in the DMRC's original DPR. However, KMRL wanted the metro to be as a medium metro corridor, as opposed to a light one, and the width was increased to 2.90 metres (9 ft 6 in).

==== Phase I ====
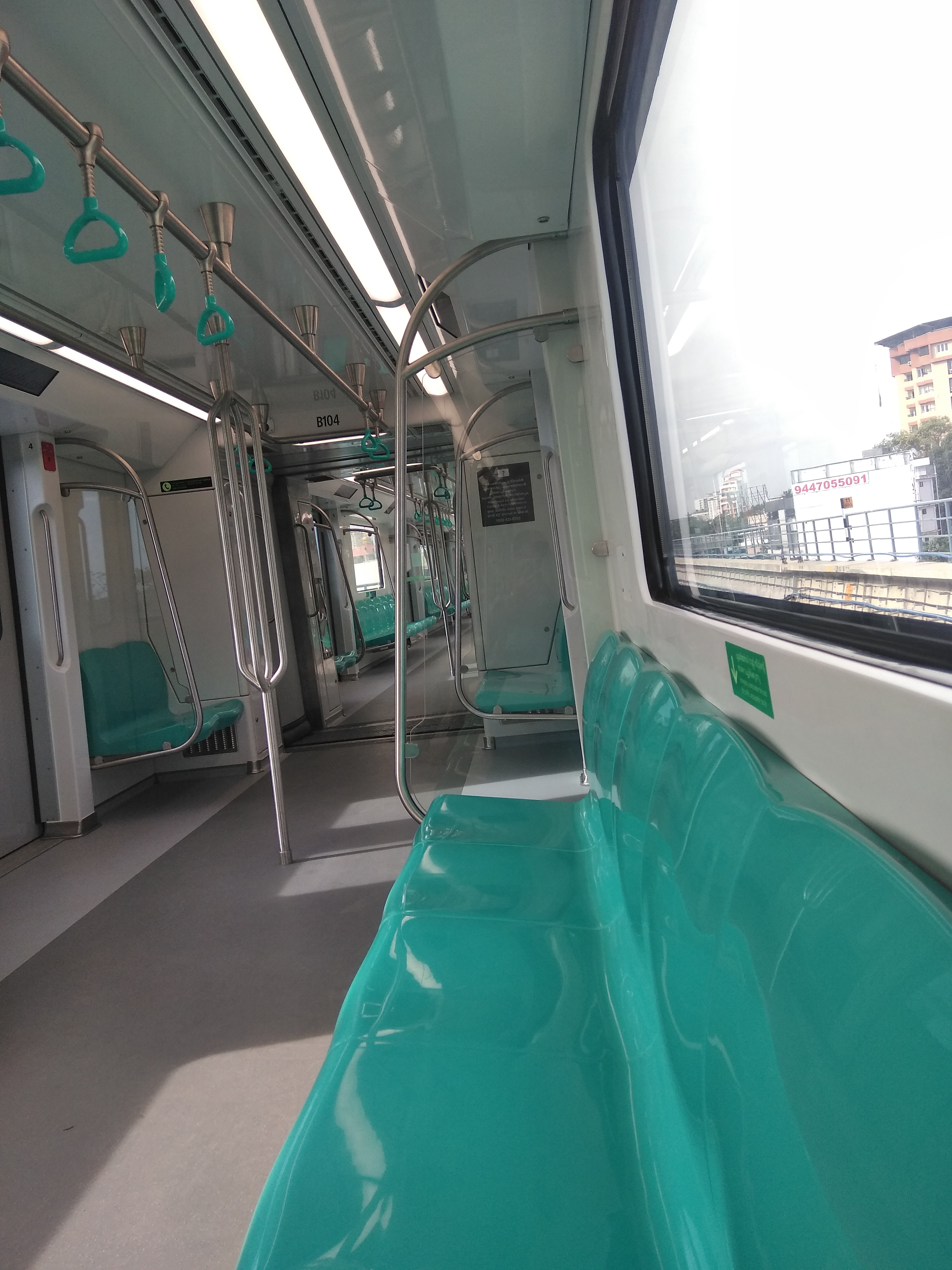
Seats of a Kochi Metro train

The DMRC floated an initial global tender in July 2013 for the manufacture and design of the coaches. Hyundai Rotem/BEML and Band Changchun Railway Vehicle Co Ltd were the only bidders when the bids were opened in December 2013. The Chinese firm did not qualify, leaving only the HYUNDAI consortium in contention. The ₹750 crore (equivalent to ₹13 billion or US$140 million in 2026) contract was re-tendered on 10 March 2014, and the coach width requirement was changed. The DMRC opposed re-tendering, stating that it might delay the metro's opening, by up to a year or more. It also argued that coaches supplied by Hyundai Rotem were already in use on the Delhi Metro, as well as a few other metros. According to Metro officials, "The delay will impact integrated trial of coaches in Aluva-Palarivattom route, initially scheduled for August 2015. With re-tendering process on, the proposed integration of coaches with tracks, third traction (sourcing power from the third rail) and signal systems can be done only by 2015-end or early 2016." The DMRC held a pre-bid meeting in New Delhi on 2 April 2014 to allow interested firms to seek clarifications regarding technical specifications for the contract for the coaches.

The re-tendering process was won by French company Alstom. The contract is for design, manufacturing, supply, installation, testing and commissioning of 25 standard track gauge trains with an option to supply 25 additional metro sets.

==== Phase II ====
Prior to the Inaugration of the Pink Line, the Managing Director of Kochi Metro Loknath Behera expressed interest in purchasing 8 more trainsets to operate the service. The purchase for them are currently on hold due to funding constraints, as the State government would have to bear the entire costs as approval from the central government has not been given to the project.. The service will initially function by 'borrowing' trainsets from the Blue line, which usually only utilises about 18 of its 25 trainsets for regular commercial service everyday. Otherwise, the Phase two service interval would increse to over 20 minutes. KMRL expects to procure further Alstom Metropolis units.

=== Signalling ===
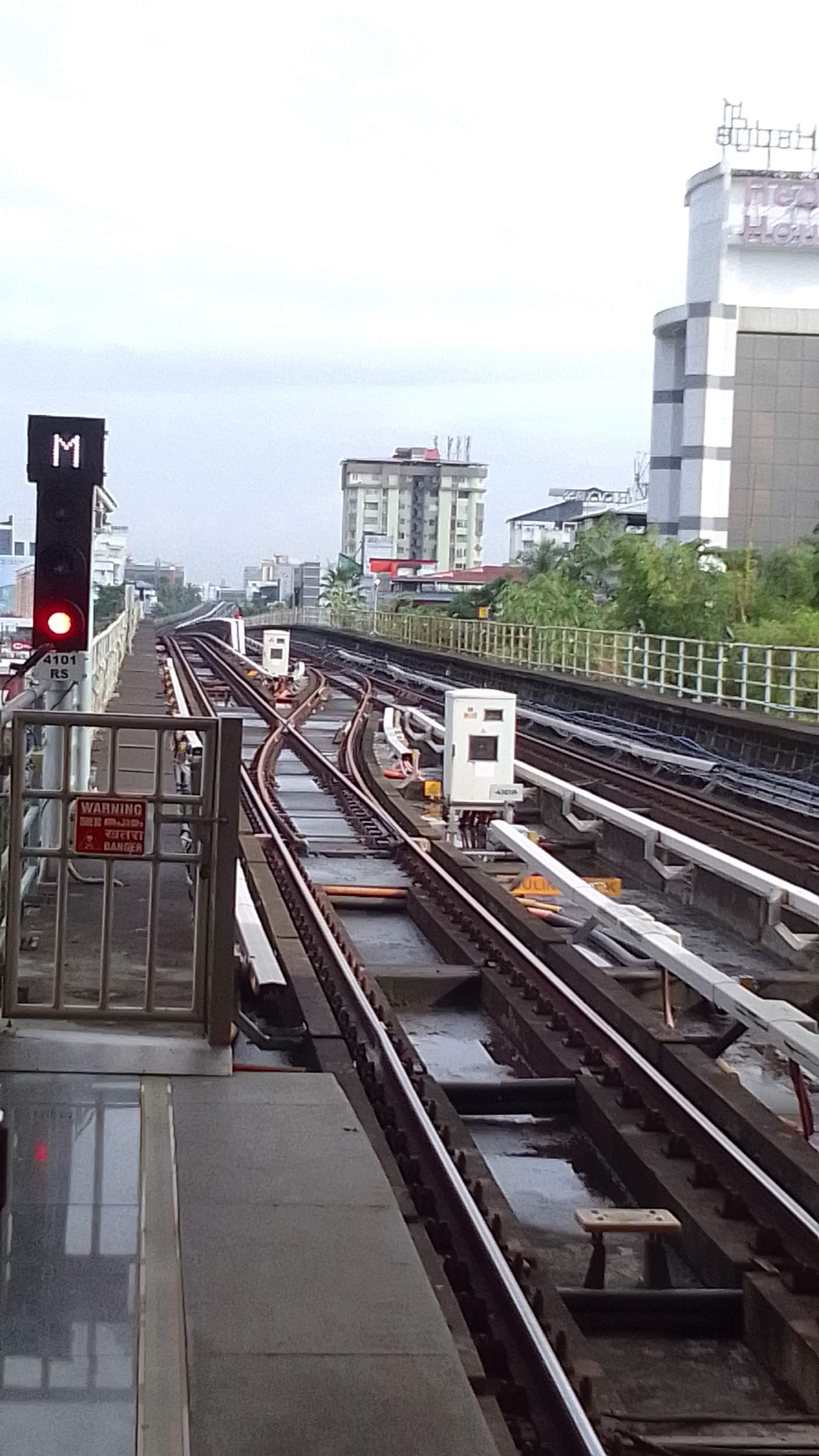
Signal system and Track Interchange

The Kochi Metro is the first metro system in India to use a communication-based train control (CBTC) system for signalling and telecommunication. In addition to train sets, the signalling contract was also won by Alstom and will use Alstom Urbalis 400 CBTC signalling. In a CBTC system, the importance of signals is limited as "beacons" located along the corridor relay the precise position of trains to the operation control centre (OCC) at Muttom. The computerised OCC monitors and controls all train movements. CBTC also enables the use of driverless trains, although the Kochi Metro will initially use metro pilots during its operations.

=== Power ===
KMRL acquired 20 MW of electricity, to operate the metro. The electricity would be supplied from the Kaloor substation of the Kerala State Electricity Board (KSEB). The DMRC was in favour of supplying power through 25 kV overhead power lines. This was opposed by the KMRL who preferred to source power from the third rail laid alongside the metro track. It was decided to supply power via the 750 V DC third rail. In January 2015, Alstom won the contract for manufacturing, supply, installation, testing and commissioning of the 750 V third-rail traction electrification and auxiliary substations (ASS) and associated SCADA systems. Under this contract, Alstom is also in charge of the supply, installation, testing and commissioning of 110 kV cabling incoming from the grid (incl. civil works), 2x GIS3; 110 kV Intake Power Substations and their associated Power Transformers 110 kV/33 kV, and 33 kV/415 V Auxiliary Transformers.

In November 2016, KMRL began installing solar panels on the rooftops of 22 stations and the buildings at the Muttom yard. The project was contracted to Hero Solar Energy (P) Ltd. The contract is based on the Renewable Energy Service Company (RESCO) model, under which Hero will invest the entire ₹27 crore (US$2.9 million) to install the panels and operate the solar power station for a period of 25 years. Under the terms of the power purchase agreement, Hero will sell the generated power to KMRL at a rate of ₹5.51 (5.9¢ US) per unit. In March 2017, KMRL unveiled a plan to install solar panels on 9 acres of land available at the Muttom yard. The Kochi Metro owns a 52.3-acre plot in Muttom, of which 31.1 acres is required for the metro depot. Installation of a 2.3 MW solar plant at the Muttom depot was completed in May 2017.

=== Parking ===
KMRL assigned Cochin University of Science and Technology (CUSAT) to conduct a feasibility study on incorporating parking spaces on the metro rail corridor. The study was focused on understanding the ridership of all 22 stations including two terminal stations and assessing the possible number of two and four-wheelers, which would require parking in the Aluva- Pettah Metro Rail corridor. As part of the study, the School of Management Studies (SMS) also prepared the layout for parking with traffic circulation plan for each station. The SMS submitted the report on 10 August 2012. A preliminary report was submitted in June 2012. CUSAT was given the task, as the report submitted by DMRC did not have specifications regarding the parking facilities. The DMRC's DPR mentioned parking lots only at the 2 terminal stations – Aluva and Pettah. CUSAT's detailed study was submitted on 10 August 2012. The study proposed parking lots adjacent to all stations with some having multi-level parking. In some stations, parking facilities connected to the station via walkways will be located away from the station due to lack of available land. KMRL will consider introducing shuttle services between parking lots and stations if the distance is long. SMS will work out the requirement of land that has to be acquired for this. KMRL says parking facilities will prevent traffic congestion and integrate personal transport system with mass rapid transit systems.

=== Skywalks ===
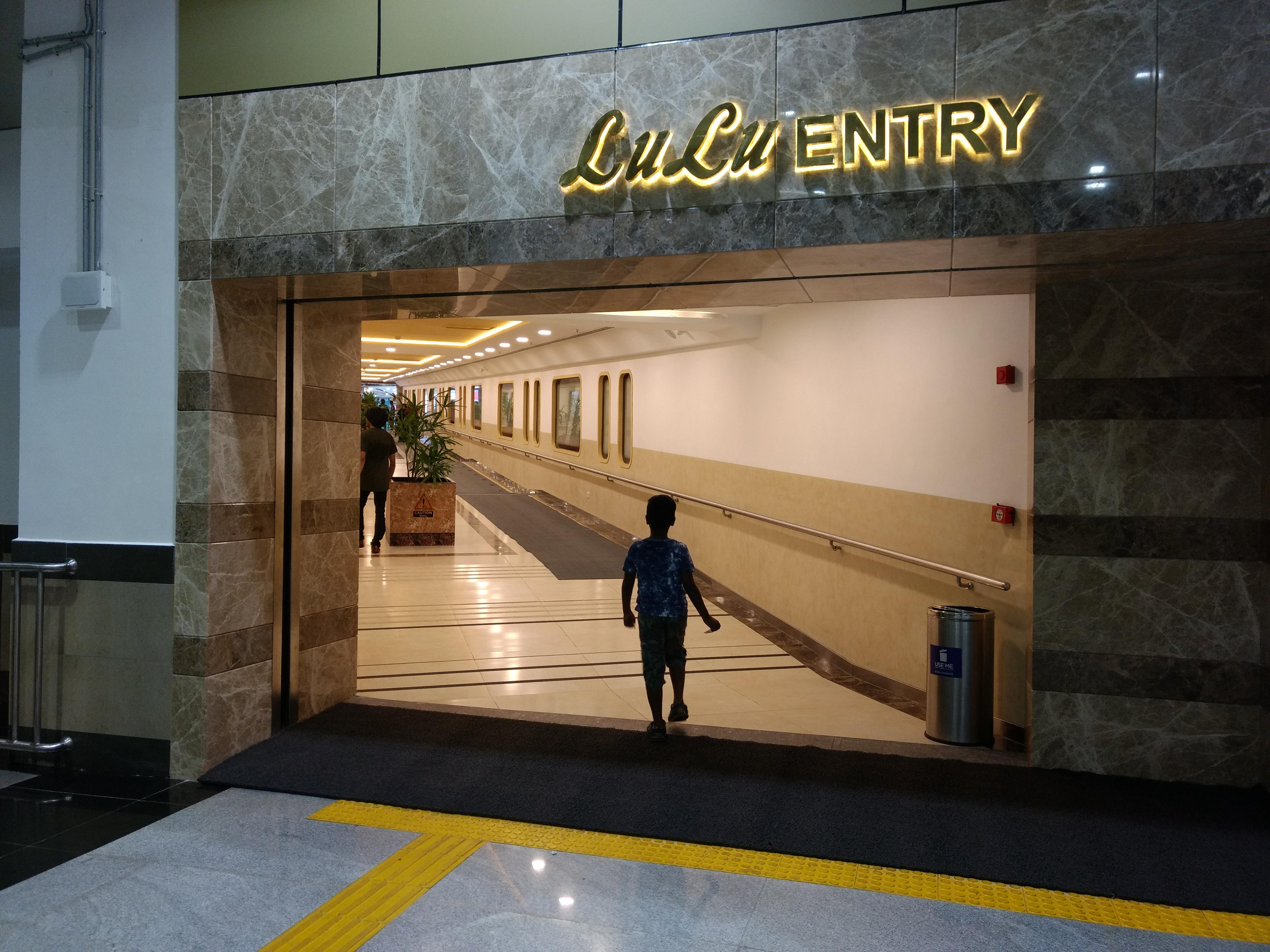
Skywalk entrance towards LuLu Mall from Edapally Station

KMRL has built skywalks connecting metro stations & nearby landmarks. At present there are two skywalks; one connecting Edapally station and LuLu Mall and the other connecting MG Road station and Chennai Silks. KMRL also plans to build skywalks connecting Ernakulam South station to Ernakulam Junction railway station and Vytilla Station to Vyttila Mobility Hub in future.

== Operations ==
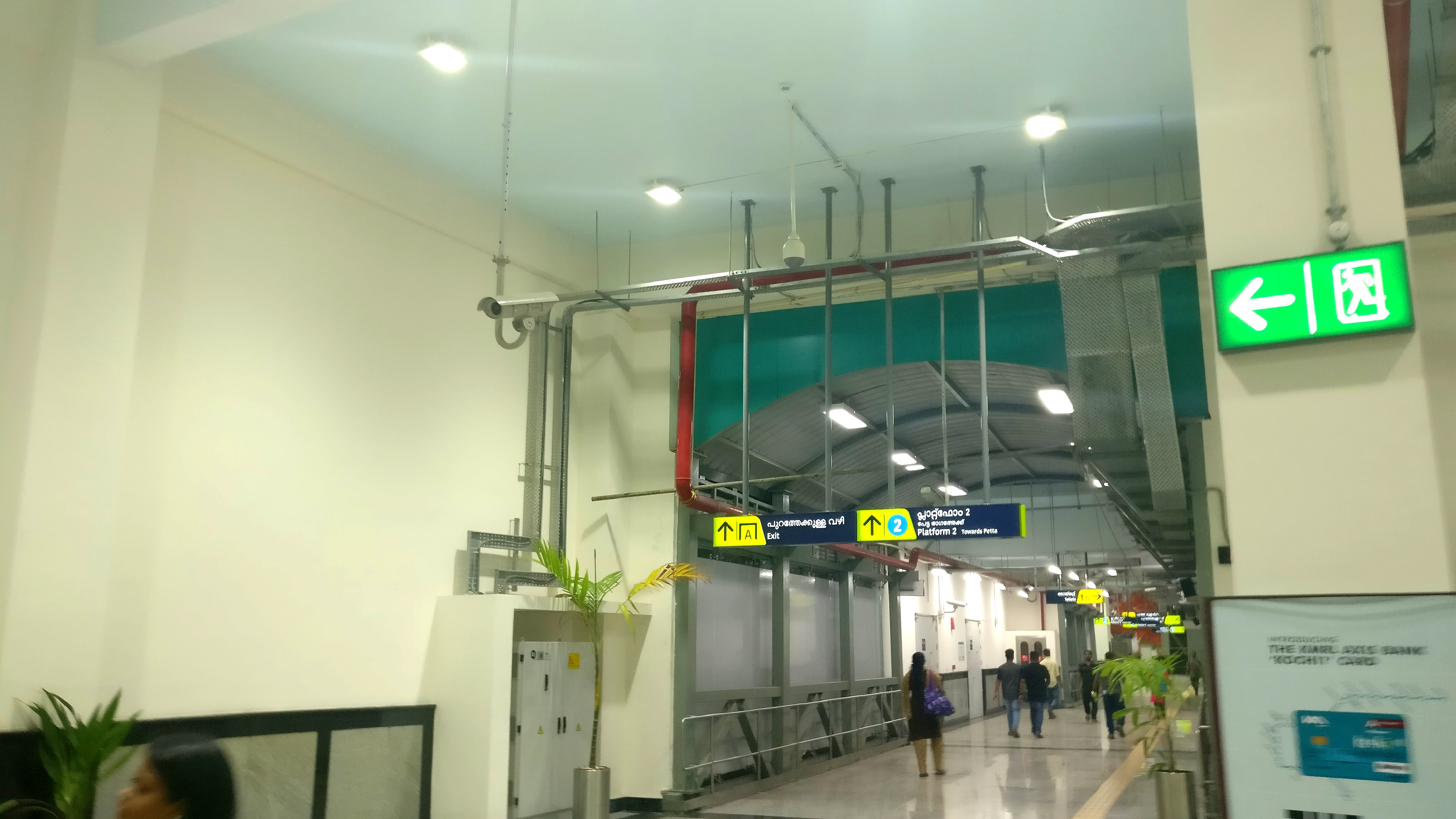
Palarivattom Metro Station

=== Annual ridership ===
Annual total ridership
Year	Ridership
2017	5,000,000
2018	12,495,884
2019	11,300,000
2020	6,190,000
2021	7,120,000
2022-23	24,875,822
2023-24	32,323,249
2024-25	35,617,580
2025-26	36,592,000

=== Open Data ===
On 16 March 2018 KMRL launched Kochi Open Data as their part of their Open Data Initiative. With this, Kochi Metro become the first metro agency in the country to adopt an open-data approach to improve access to its services in the Kochi city. The information on scheduled stops, routes and fares have been converted into the universally accepted General Transit Feed Specification (GTFS) and has been allowed to developers, entrepreneurs, data analysts to download from the KMRL website.

=== Fare collection ===
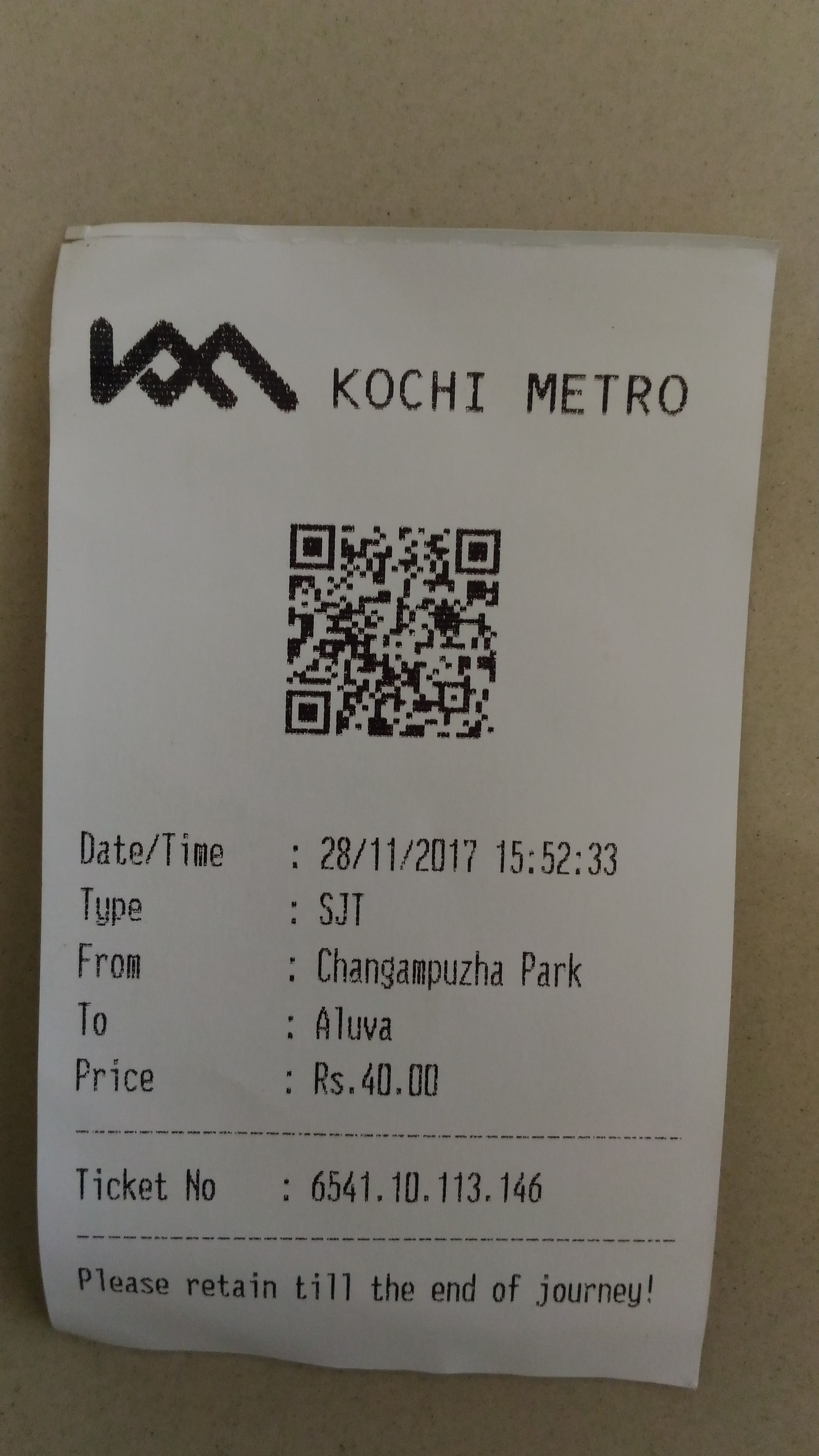
A Kochi Metro ticket

The minimum fare on the Kochi Metro is ₹10 (11¢ US) and the maximum is ₹60 (64¢ US). The metro line is split into 6 fare zones named F1, F2, F3, F4, F5 and F6, corresponding to a distance that is a multiple of five. The minimum fare of ₹10 applies for the first 2 km, with rates increasing by ₹10 for subsequent fare zone. Metro fares are slightly higher than the fare for Volvo city bus services in Kochi.

The metro system uses the Kochi One pre-paid EMV chip smart card, which can also be used on other modes of public transport in the city, including KSRTC and private buses, ferries operated by the SWTD, and the Kochi electric boats of Kochi Water Metro operated by the KWML.

Passengers using feeder autorickshaws from Kochi metro stations can pay for their rides with debit or credit cards, various UPI apps, and the Kochi-1 card.

=== Frequency ===
The metro operates with a headway of 7 minutes. Train service starts at 6:00 a.m. and continues till 10:00 p.m. from Monday to Saturday. On Sundays, the service starts at 8:00 a.m. and ends at 10:00 p.m. this has been extended to 11:00 pm from 15 February 2026. On special occasions and holidays, the metro services operates at different times as issued in a notice by KMRL.

=== Management ===
KMRL signed an agreement with Kudumbashree, a women's self-help group, on 11 December 2016 to manage the metro station premises including ticketing, customer relations, housekeeping, parking management and running the canteens. KMRL stated that it would also hire transgender employees along with Kudumbashree.

=== Boat service ===
A boat service from Vyttila to Kakkanad, operated by the Kerala State Water Transport Department (KSWTD) was launched on 19 November 2013. It is integrated with the metro and was used for diverting traffic during construction of the metro. The boats were manufactured by Steel Industries Kerala Ltd, Kannur (part of Steel Authority of India Ltd). The boats complete the 9 km (5.6 mi) Vyttila-Kakkanad journey in approximately 25 minutes.

In February 2017, the Kerala Government announced a plan for Kochi Water Metro service spanning 16 routes in Kochi. The water metro system started operation on 26 April 2023.

=== Bus service ===
KMRL operates feeder buses under the name "Metro Connect", connecting metro stations with Cochin International airport and nearby commercial hubs. A fleet of 15 electric, air-conditioned Eicher buses is used for this service.

== Controversy ==
In January 2012, in response to the Kerala government's decision to have the Kochi Metro project go through a global tender, Kodiyeri Balakrishnan, of the opposition party the Communist Party of India (Marxist) (CPI(M)), accused Chief Minister Oommen Chandy of trying to oust the Delhi Metro Rail Corporation (DMRC).

In early 2014, E. Sreedharan criticised Kochi Metro Railway Limited (KMRL) for its involvement in the re-tender for the procurement of coaches for the project, saying that this would result in a delay of six or seven months. Arayadan Muhammed, Minister for Power and Transport of Kerala, responded that KMRL called for the tender for the sake of transparency. In the earlier tender that the DMRC had floated, the sole bidder was Hyundai. The second tender was won by Alstom, which placed a lower bid.

== See also ==
- Transport in Kochi
- Kochi Water Metro
- Rapid transit in India
