= Town Hall metro station =

Metro station in Kochi, India

Town Hall

General information
- Coordinates: 9.991247°N 76.288035°E
- System: Kochi Metro rapid transit
- Connections: Ernakulam Town

History
- Opened: 3 October 2017
- Former names: Lissie

Services
Preceding station	Kochi Metro	Following station
Kaloor towards Aluva	Line 1	M. G. Road towards Thrippunithura Terminal
Route map
Location
- Location within Kochi

Town Hall Metro Station is a station of Kochi Metro, formerly known as Lissie Metro Station. It was opened on 3 October 2017 as a part of the extension of the metro system from Palarivattom to Maharaja's College. The station is located between Kaloor and M. G. Road. The former name of the station refers to the name of the nearby Lissie Hospital, which, in turns, is derived from Thérèse of Lisieux. The station was renamed on 1 February 2020. Ernakulam Town railway station is located near to this metro station.

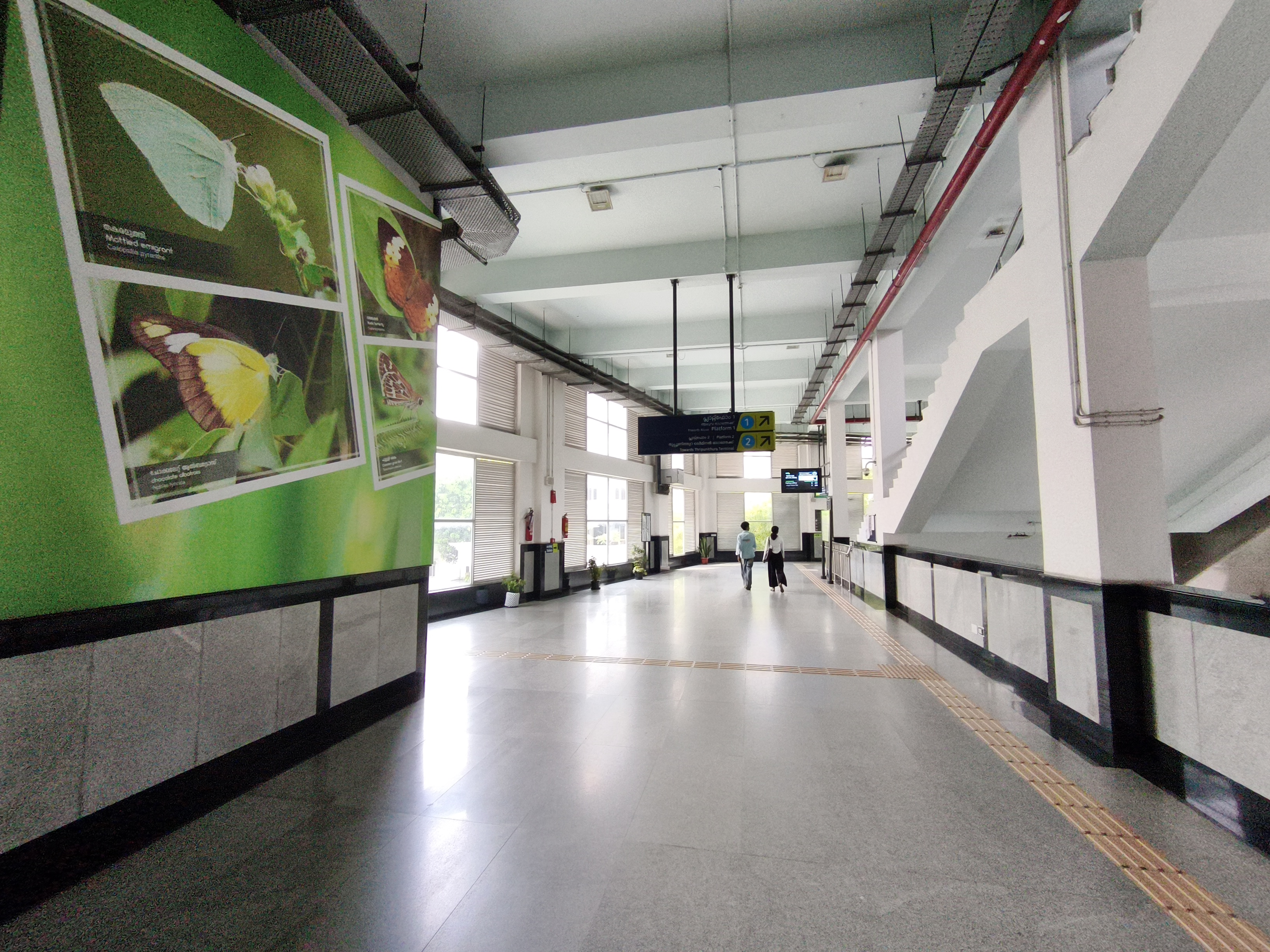
Town Hall metro station concourse
