= Lourde Nagar-Pulinchode =

Lourde Nagar - Pulinchode
- Place
- Interactive map of Lourde Nagar - Pulinchode
- Coordinates: 11°29′0″N 75°3′0″E
- Country: India
- State: Kerala
- District: Thrissur
- Time zone: IST
- Postal code: 680616

Lourde Nagar is located in the Thrissur district of Kerala state, India. It borders Chetuva to the north and Pulinchode to the south. To the west is the NH-17 and to the east is Canoli Canal. The native languages are Malayalam & English, most people speak Malayalam. It depends on Persian Gulf countries for income.

== Coordinates ==
Latitude 8.5878 Longitude 76.9770

== Religious organizations ==
St Mary's Lourdes Church

== Transport ==
- Nearest airport: Cochin International Airport, Kochi - 67km
- Nearest railway stations: Guruvayoor - 7km, Thrissur - 29km
