= M. G. Road metro station (Kochi) =

Metro station of Kochi Metro

M. G. Road

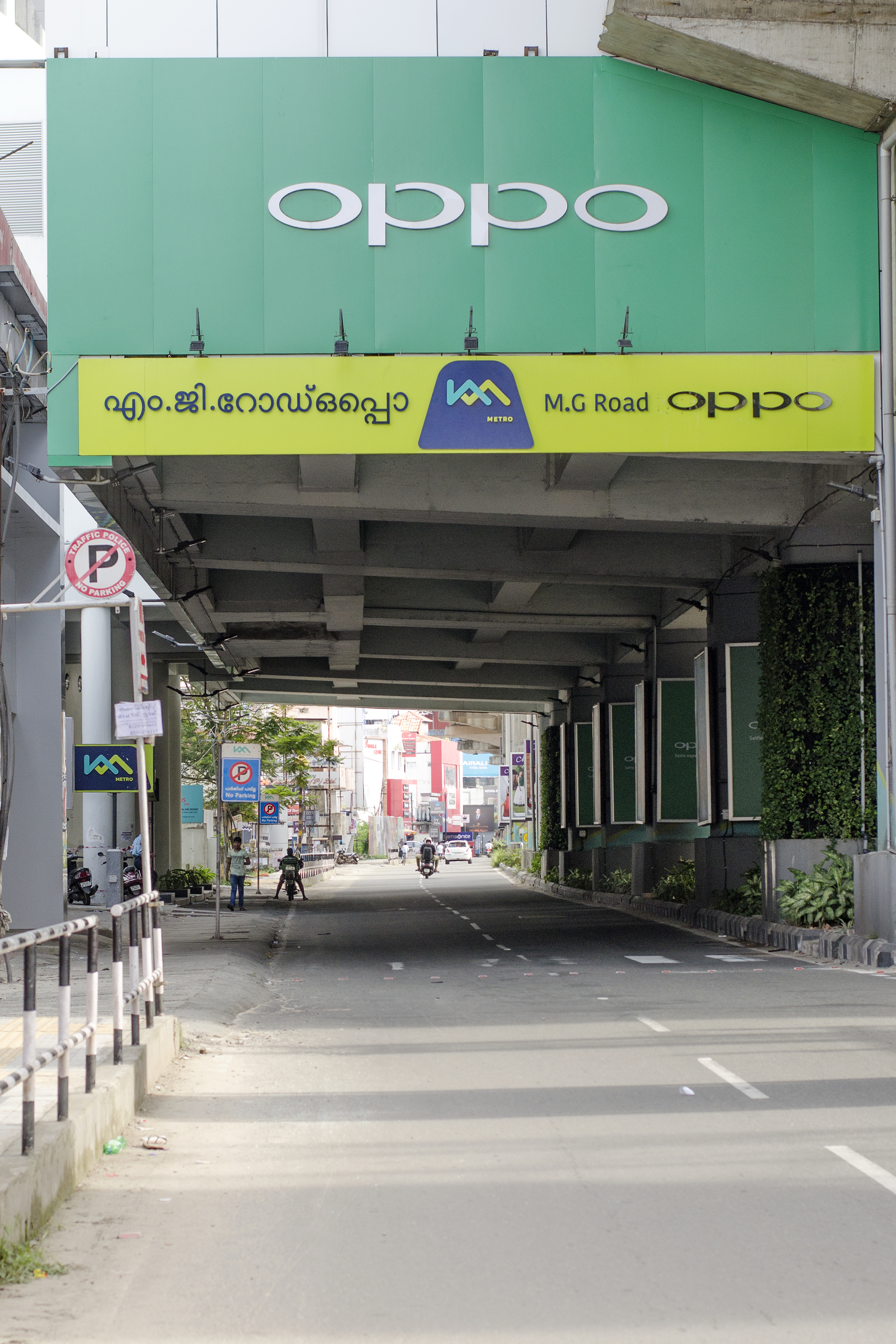

General information
- Location: Mahatama Gandhi Road, Kochi; Kerala; India
- Coordinates: 9.983395°N 76.282351°E
- System: Kochi Metro rapid transit

History
- Opened: 3 October 2017

Services
Preceding station	Kochi Metro	Following station
Town Hall towards Aluva	Line 1	Maharaja's College towards Thrippunithura Terminal
Route map
Location
- Location within Kochi

M. G. Road is a station of Kochi Metro. It was opened on 3 October 2017 as a part of the extension of the metro system from Palarivattom to Maharaja's College. The station is located between Town Hall and Maharaja's College. The name of the station refers to Mahatma Gandhi Road. It is also located at a distance of 1.3 kilometres (0.81 mi) from the High Court water metro station.
