= Super Fast (KSRTC) =

Bus service operated by Kerala State Road Transport Corporation

Super Fast Passenger
- A KSRTC Super Fast bus in 2026
- Parent: Kerala State Road Transport Corporation
- Founded: 1990's
- Locale: Kerala
- Service area: Kerala, Tamil Nadu, Karnataka
- Service type: Non AC, AC (for premium)
- Operator: KSRTC, KSRTC SWIFT
- Website: www.keralartc.com

Super Fast or Super Fast Passenger (SFP) is a fleet of bus services operated by the Kerala State Road Transport Corporation (KSRTC) in the Indian state of Kerala. It is one of the Super Class services operated by KSRTC, above the Fast Passenger service in the service classification.

== Overview ==
Super Fast Passenger services are the intercity and inter-town bus services of KSRTC with 3+2 seating arrangement that operates with fewer stops than Fast Passenger services. Introduced in 1990's, it covers large distances of generally more than 150 km. Unlike Fast Passenger which has stops at every intermediate location, Super Fast services only have stops at major towns and intended for long-distances travel. Most of the services connects at least two districts.

A Super Fast bus of KSRTC SWIFT in 2026

In 2024, KSRTC introduced air-conditioned and premium variants of the Super Fast service. The Super Fast Premium AC service having 40 seats was introduced on a trial basis. The premium services has fewer stops than regular Super Fast services and charge a surcharge over the regular Super Fast fare. Super Fast services are operated by KSRTC as well as through KSRTC-SWIFT.

Super Fast bus of new fleet introduced in 2025

In 2025, KSRTC introduced new fleet of Super Fast buses as part of its fleet modernisation. The buses were built on Tata chassis with bodies manufactured by Automobile Corporation of Goa Limited.

== See also ==
- Fast Passenger (KSRTC)
- Minnal (KSRTC)
- Kerala State Road Transport Corporation
- KSRTC SWIFT
