= J. L. N. Stadium metro station =

Station of Kochi Metro

J. L. N. Stadium

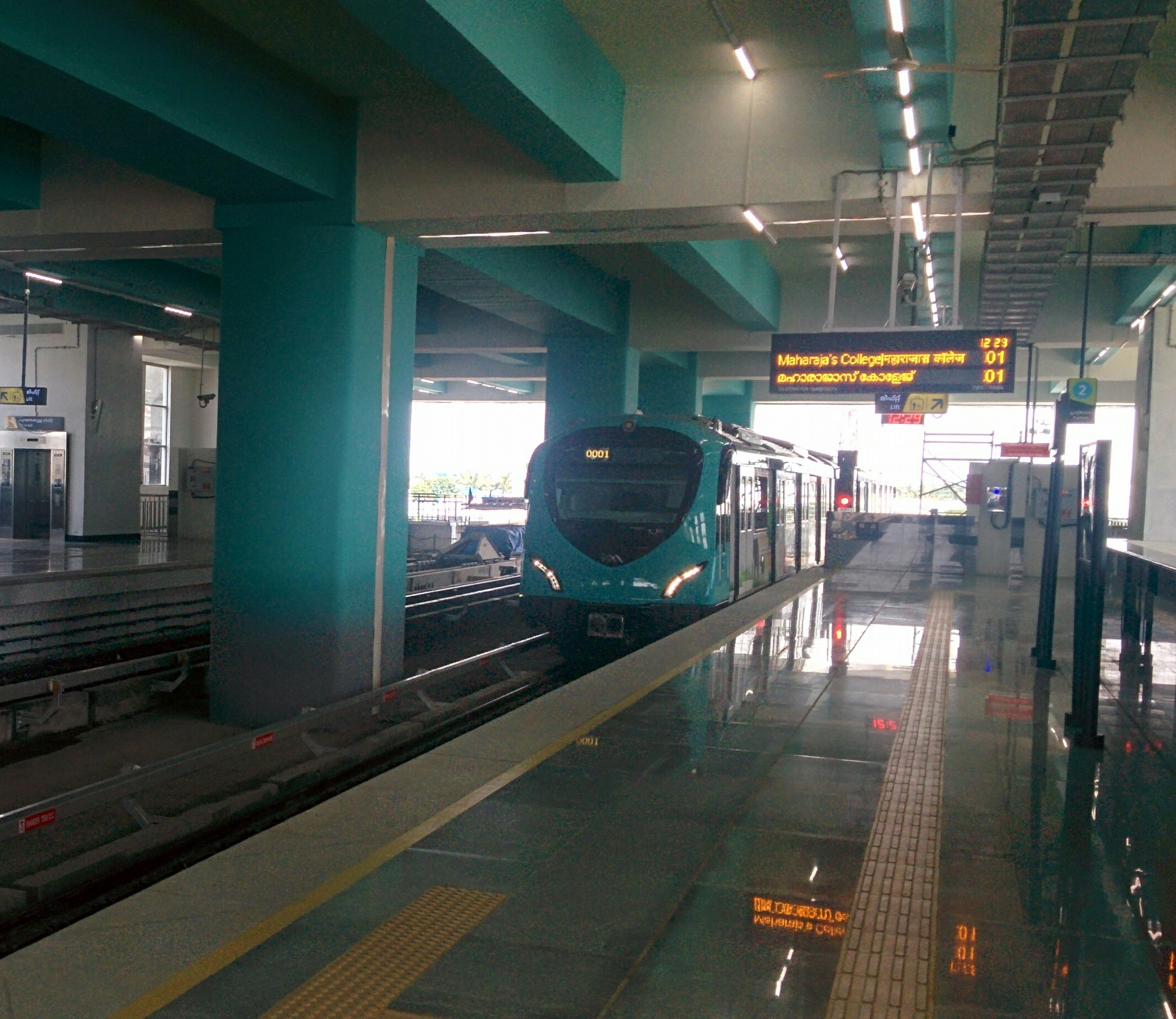

General information
- Location: Jawaharlal Nehru Stadium Metro Station, 4th Floor, Kaloor, Kochi, Kerala - 682017
- Coordinates: 10.000554°N 76.299535°E
- System: Kochi Metro rapid transit

History
- Opened: 3 October 2017

Services
Preceding station	Kochi Metro	Following station
Palarivattom towards Aluva	Line 1	Kaloor towards Thrippunithura Terminal
Route map
Location
- Location within Kochi

J. L. N. Stadium is a station of Kochi Metro. It was opened on 3 October 2017 as a part of the extension of the metro system from Palarivattom to Maharaja's College. The station is located between Palarivattom and Kaloor. The name of the station is given because of the Jawaharlal Nehru Stadium. The 11.2 km extension to Infopark via Kakkanad as a part of Kochi Metro project phase two begins from J. L. N. Stadium station. The corporate office of Kochi Metro Rail Limited is also located at this station.
