= Fast Passenger (KSRTC) =

Bus service operated by Kerala State Road Transport Corporation

- A KSRTC Fast Passenger bus in 2026
- Parent: Kerala State Road Transport Corporation
- Founded: 1970's
- Locale: Kerala
- Service area: Kerala, Tamil Nadu, Karnataka
- Service type: Non AC
- Operator: KSRTC, KSRTC SWIFT
- Website: www.keralartc.com

Fast Passenger or Limited Stop Fast Passenger (LSFP) is a fleet of bus services operated by the Kerala State Road Transport Corporation (KSRTC) in the Indian state of Kerala. It is one of the Super Class services operated by KSRTC, below the Super Fast service in the service classification.

== Overview ==
Fast Passenger services are the intercity and inter-town bus services of KSRTC with 3+2 seating arrangement that operates with fewer stops than ordinary services and covers medium distances (generally between 50 to 160 km). It is a part of KSRTC's network of stage carriage services for several decades. The service was established by the corporation in the late 1970's. Fast Passenger services are operated by KSRTC as well as through KSRTC-SWIFT. The Kerala government's fare regulations distinguish Fast Passenger from City Fast Passenger, Super Fast and Super Express services. The service has been used on both intercity and longer-distance routes across the state. Fast Passenger service has a higher fare than ordinary services and a lower fare than Super Fast services.

Fast passenger bus of new fleet introduced in 2025

In 2025, KSRTC introduced new fleet of Fast Passenger buses as part of its fleet modernisation. The buses were built on Tata chassis with bodies manufactured by Automobile Corporation of Goa Limited.

== See also ==
- Super Fast (KSRTC)
- Minnal (KSRTC)
- Kerala State Road Transport Corporation
- KSRTC SWIFT
