= Pulinchode =

- Interactive map of Pulinchode
- Coordinates: 10°30′0″N 76°3′0″E
- Country: India
- State: Kerala
- District: Thrissur
- Time zone: IST
- Postal code: 680616
- Schools: 1
- Hospitals: 1
- Libraries: 2
- Wards: 4
- Fishing Harbours: 1

Pulinchode is a place in Engandiyoor village located in the Thrissur district of Kerala state, India. This Place shares borders with Chetuva on the north side and Chantha on the south side. On the west side is the Anjam Kallu and to the east Canoli Canal. The native languages of Pulinchode are Malayalam & English. Most of the people use the Malayalam language for communication.

Pulinchode is dependent on Persian Gulf countries for income.

== Arts & sports clubs ==
There are various arts & sports clubs in the area, such as the Pulinchode Youth Club, Vallabhatta Engandiyoor, BLS Engandiyoor, Sardar Pulikkakadav, GSS Engandiyoor, and NASC Engandiyoor.

== Religious organizations ==
Religious organizations include:

- Pulinchode Centre Ulsava Committee
- Pulinchode Vadakku Bagam Ulsava Committee
- Pulinchode Padinjaru bagam Ulsava Committee
- Pulinchode Kizhakkumury Ulasava Committee
- Saint Sebastian Vadakkumury Samudhayam

The famous St Mary's Lourdes Church is located in this place.

== Youth organizations ==
- ലൂർദ് വോയിസ്‌ (Lourde Nagar-Pulinchode)
- Youth Wing Pulinchode

== Transportation to Pulinchode ==
- Nearest airport: Cochin International Airport, Kochi - 67 km
- Nearest railway station: Thrissur - 29 km
- Next closest railway station: Guruvayoor 7 km by road

== See also ==
- Lourde Nagar-Pulinchode
