= Maharaja's College metro station =

Station of Kochi Metro

Maharaja's College

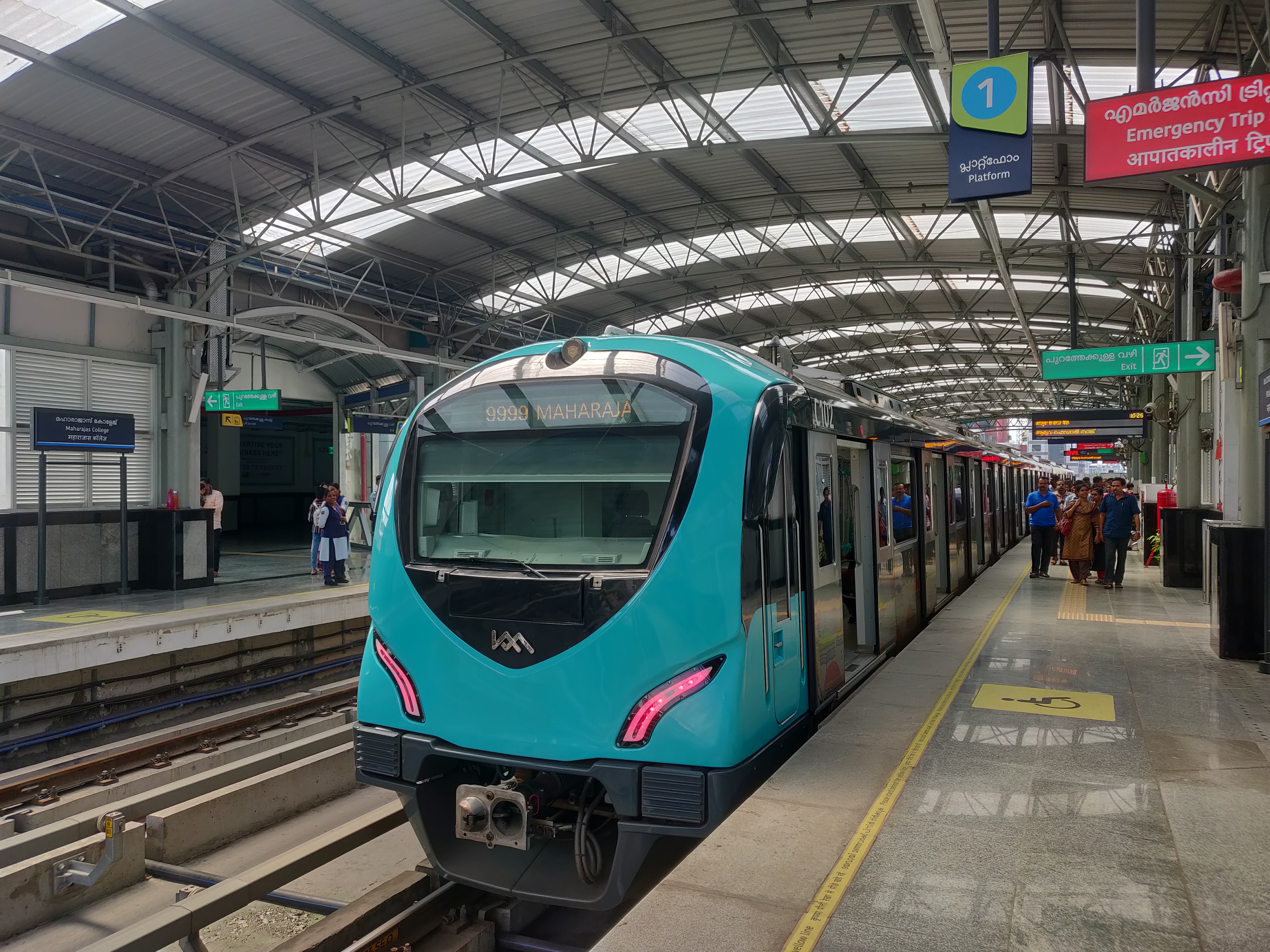

General information
- Coordinates: 9.973487°N 76.285015°E
- System: Kochi Metro rapid transit

History
- Opened: 3 October 2017

Services
Preceding station	Kochi Metro	Following station
M. G. Road towards Aluva	Line 1	Ernakulam South towards Thrippunithura Terminal
Route map
Location
- Location within Kochi

Maharaja's College is a station of Kochi Metro. It was opened on 3 October 2017 as a part of the extension of the metro system from Palarivattom to Maharaja's College. The station remained the western terminus of the line until 3 September 2019, when the line was extended to Thaikoodam. The previous station is M. G. Road. The name of the station refers to Maharaja's College. It is located a kilometre away from the Ernakulam KSRTC Bus Station.

== See also ==
- Ernakulam KSRTC Bus Station
