= Palarivattom metro station =

Station of Kochi Metro

Palarivattom

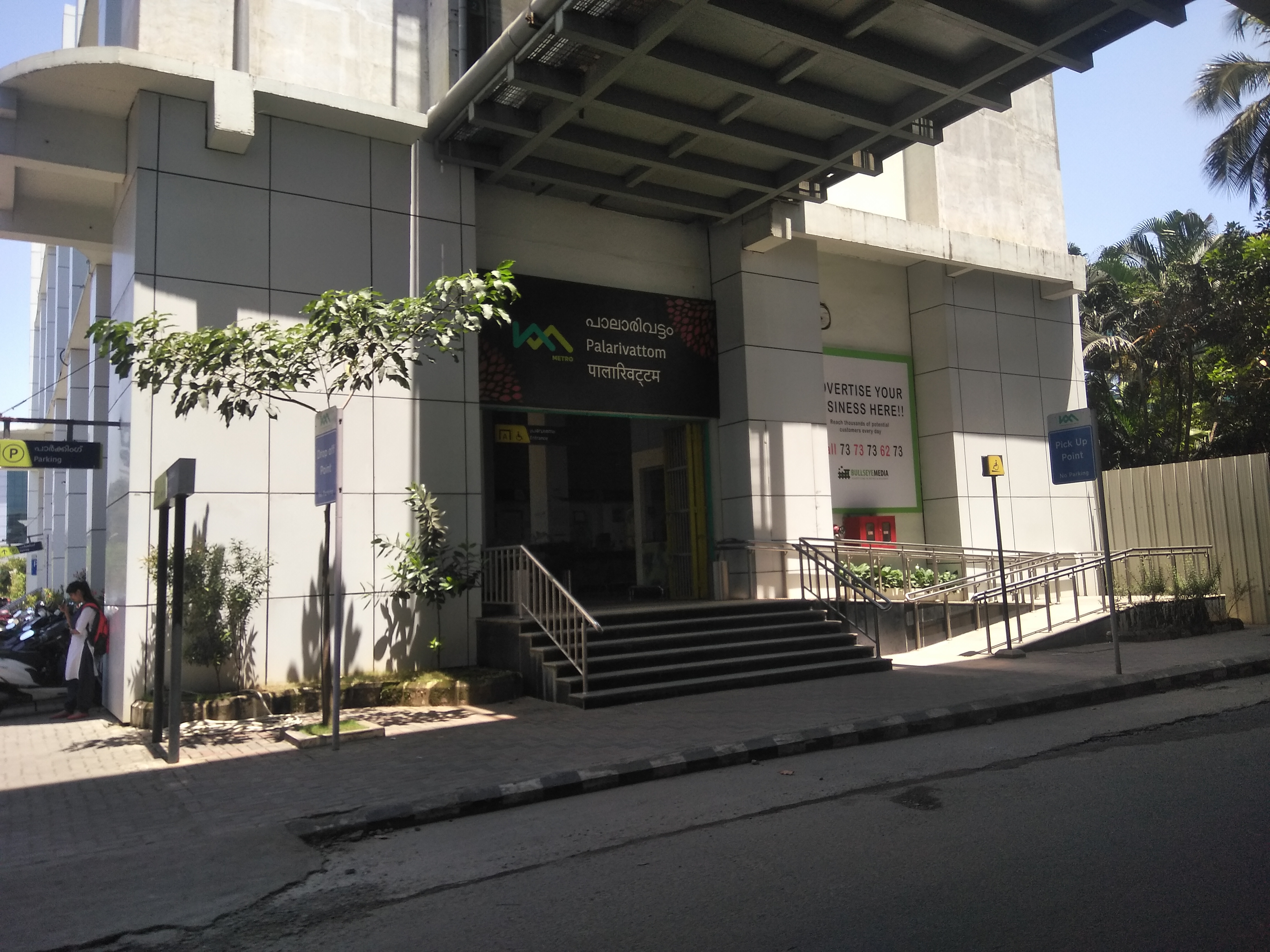

General information
- Coordinates: 10.006432°N 76.304769°E
- System: Kochi Metro rapid transit

History
- Opened: 19 June 2017

Services
Preceding station	Kochi Metro	Following station
Changampuzha Park towards Aluva	Line 1	J. L. N. Stadium towards Thrippunithura Terminal
Route map
Location
- Location within Kochi

Palarivattom is a station of Kochi Metro. The station served as the south terminus of the line until the extension to Maharaja's College was opened on 3 October 2017. The station is now located between Changampuzha Park and J. L. N. Stadium. The name of the station originates from Palarivattom, the area it is located.

It was inaugurated by the Prime Minister of India Narendra Modi on 17 June and opened for public on 19 June 2017 as a part of the first stretch of the metro system, between Aluva and Palarivattom.
