= KSRTC SWIFT =

Indian transport company

- Trade name: K-SWIFT
- Company type: Owned by the Government of Kerala
- Industry: Public transport
- Founded: 9 November 2021; 4 years ago
- Headquarters: Anayara, Thiruvananthapuram
- Areas served: Kerala; Karnataka; Puducherry; Tamil Nadu
- Key people: Pramoj Sanker IOFS (Chairman & MD)
- Services: Bus transport
- Number of employees: 325
- Parent: Kerala State Road Transport Corporation
- Website: ksrtcswift.kerala.gov.in

Kerala State Road Transport Corporation SWIFT (KSRTC SWIFT), also known as K-SWIFT, is an Indian transport company formed for operating long-distance buses of Kerala State Road Transport Corporation (KSRTC). The company was formed on 9 November 2021 with an aim to overcome the financial crisis faced by the KSRTC. K-SWIFT functions independently within the KSRTC and the company will be dissolved and the assets merged with the KSRTC in 2031.

== History ==
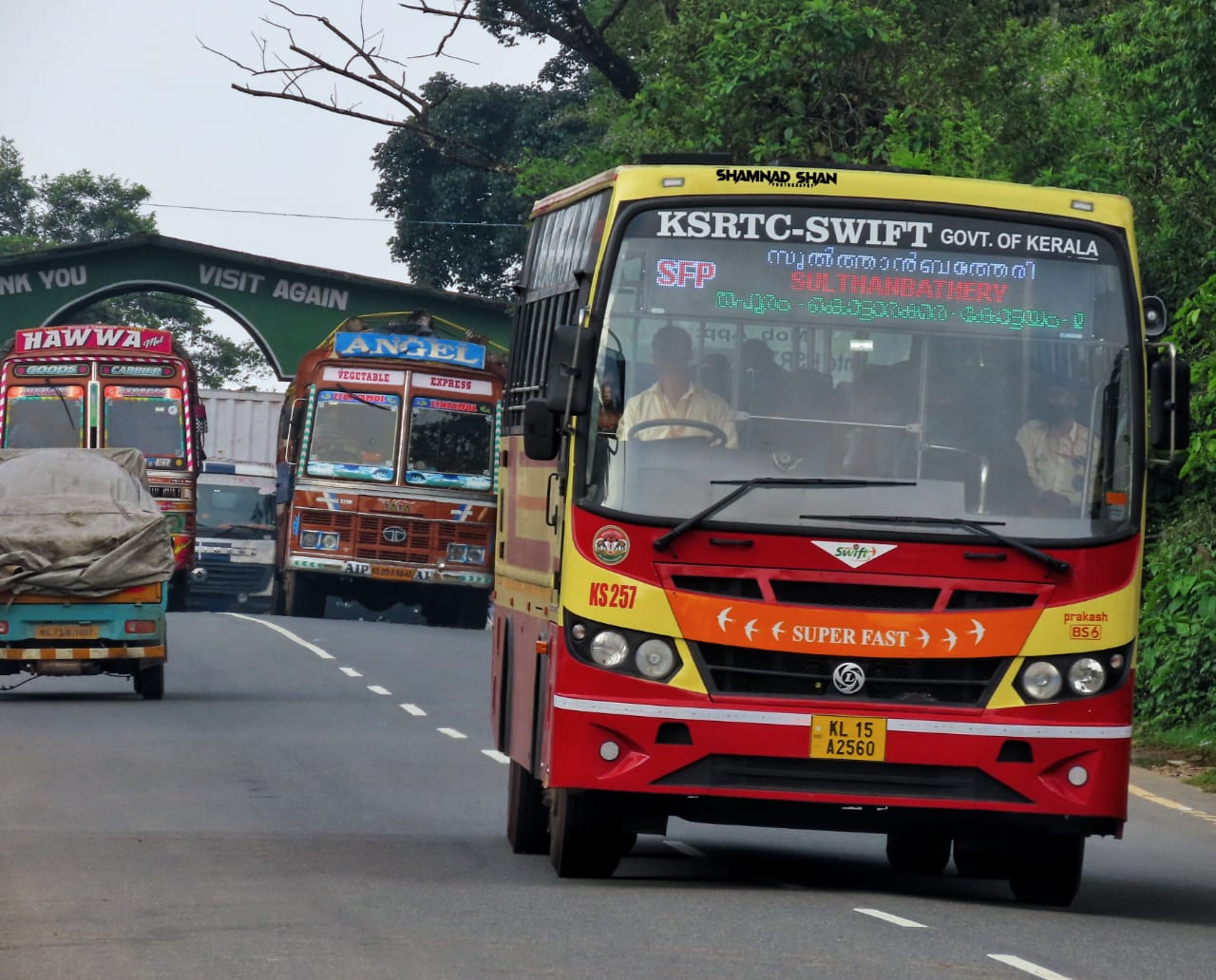
A Swift Bus from TVC to Sulthan Bathery

KSRTC SWIFT was formed on 9 November 2021. The Government of Kerala set up five temporary posts of senior managers in the newly formed company. Also, KSRTC CMD was entrusted with the task of cooperating with the company.

== Services ==
Deluxe Air Bus
Premium, low deck, semi sleeper bus comes both in AC and Non-AC, manufactured by Ashok Leyland with key features of rear-air suspension, mobile charging and large glass panel.

Gajaraj
Introduced in 2022, Gajaraj is KSRTC Swift's flagship service and is operated using eight Volvo 9400 B11R 15M AC sleeper buses. These buses are operated on long distance / interstate routes.

Garuda
AC Seater bus for interstate travel. Commonly operated on routes to Tamil Nadu and Karnataka.
