= Fort Kochi water metro station =

Station of Kochi Water Metro

Fort Kochi water metro station ഫോർട്ട് കൊച്ചി വാട്ടർ മെട്രോ സ്റ്റേഷൻ
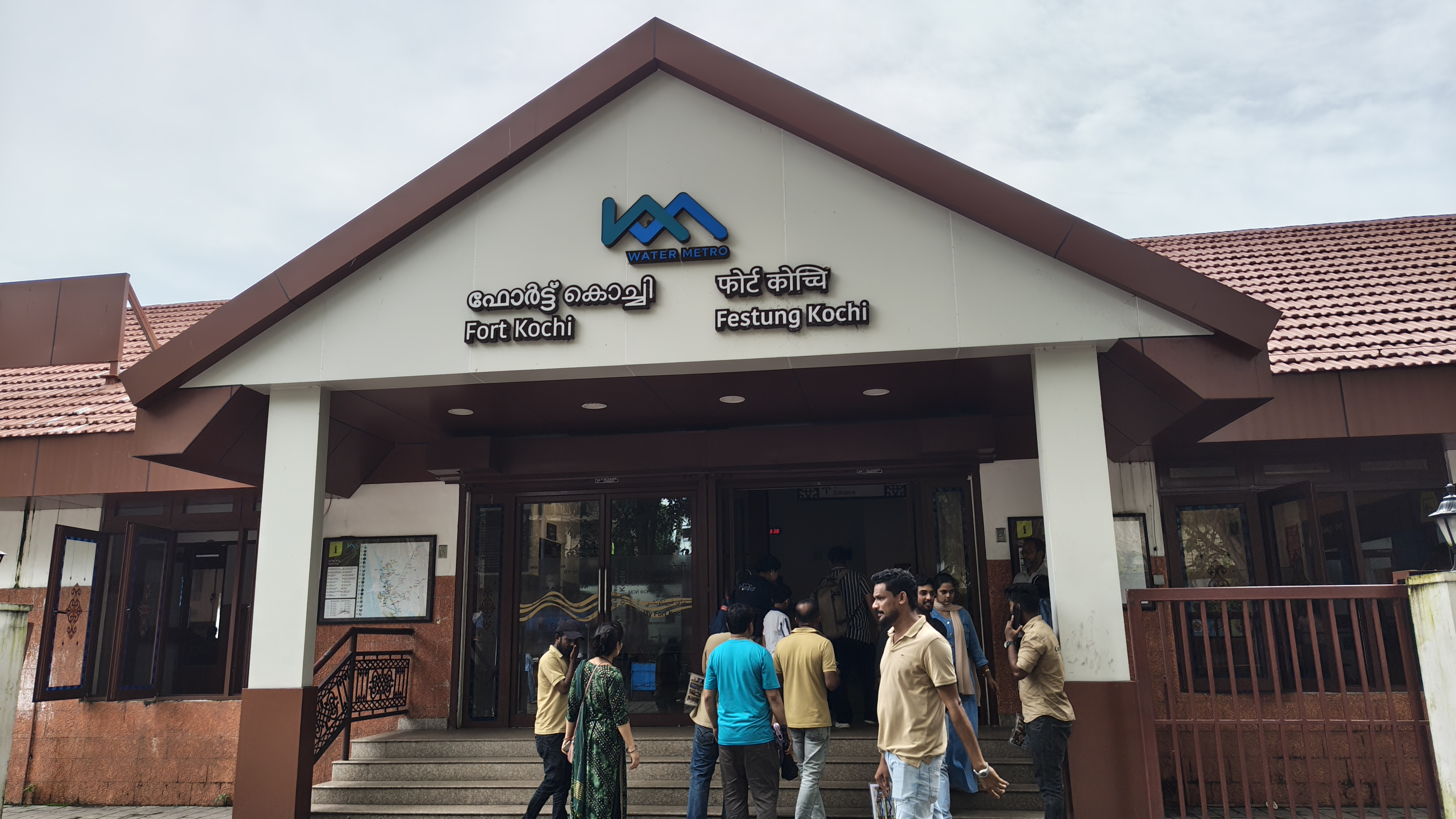
- Fort Kochi Water metro station

General information
- Location: India
- Owner: Kochi Water Metro Limited
- Operator: Kochi Water Metro
- Manager: Kochi Metro Rail Limited

History
- Opened: 21 April 2024

Fort Kochi is a station of Kochi Water Metro. The station is located near to the Fort Kochi beach. This station is connected with High Court water metro station. It was opened to public on 21 April 2024 as a part of the first phase of the water metro system.
