= Kakkanad water metro station =

Station of Kochi Water Metro

Kakkanad water metro station കാക്കനാട് വാട്ടർ മെട്രോ സ്റ്റേഷൻ
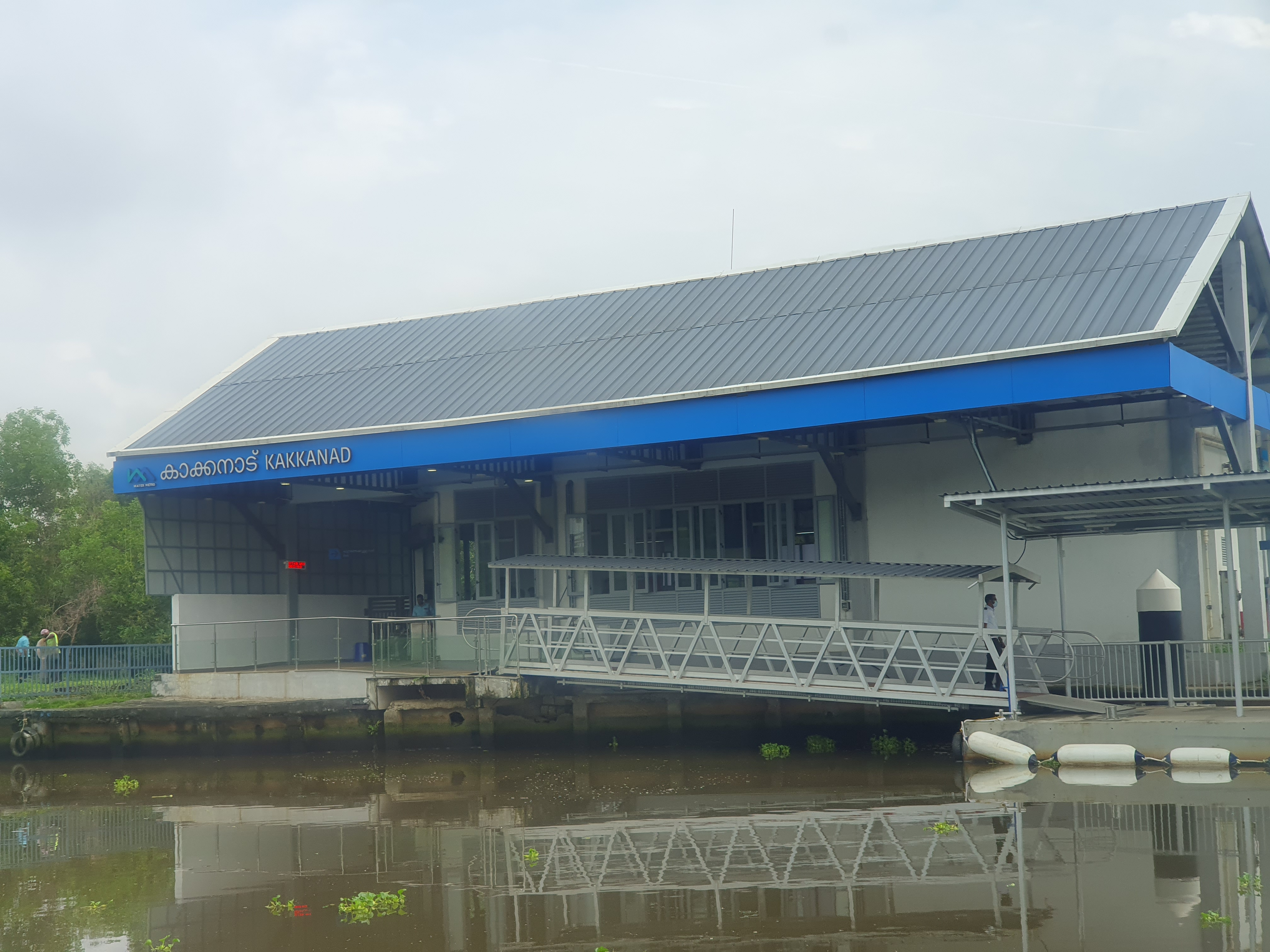
- Kakkanad water metro station

General information
- Location: India
- Owner: Kochi Water Metro Limited
- Operator: Kochi Water Metro
- Manager: Kochi Metro Rail Limited

History
- Opened: 27 April 2023

Kakkanad is a station of Kochi Water Metro. The station is located on Chittethukara at a distance of 2 km from Kakkanad. This station is connected with Vyttila water metro station by the water metro. It was inaugurated by the Prime Minister of India, Narendra Modi on 25 April 2023 and opened for public on 27 April as a part of the first phase of the water metro system.
