= Elamkulam metro station =

Metro station in Kochi, India

Elamkulam

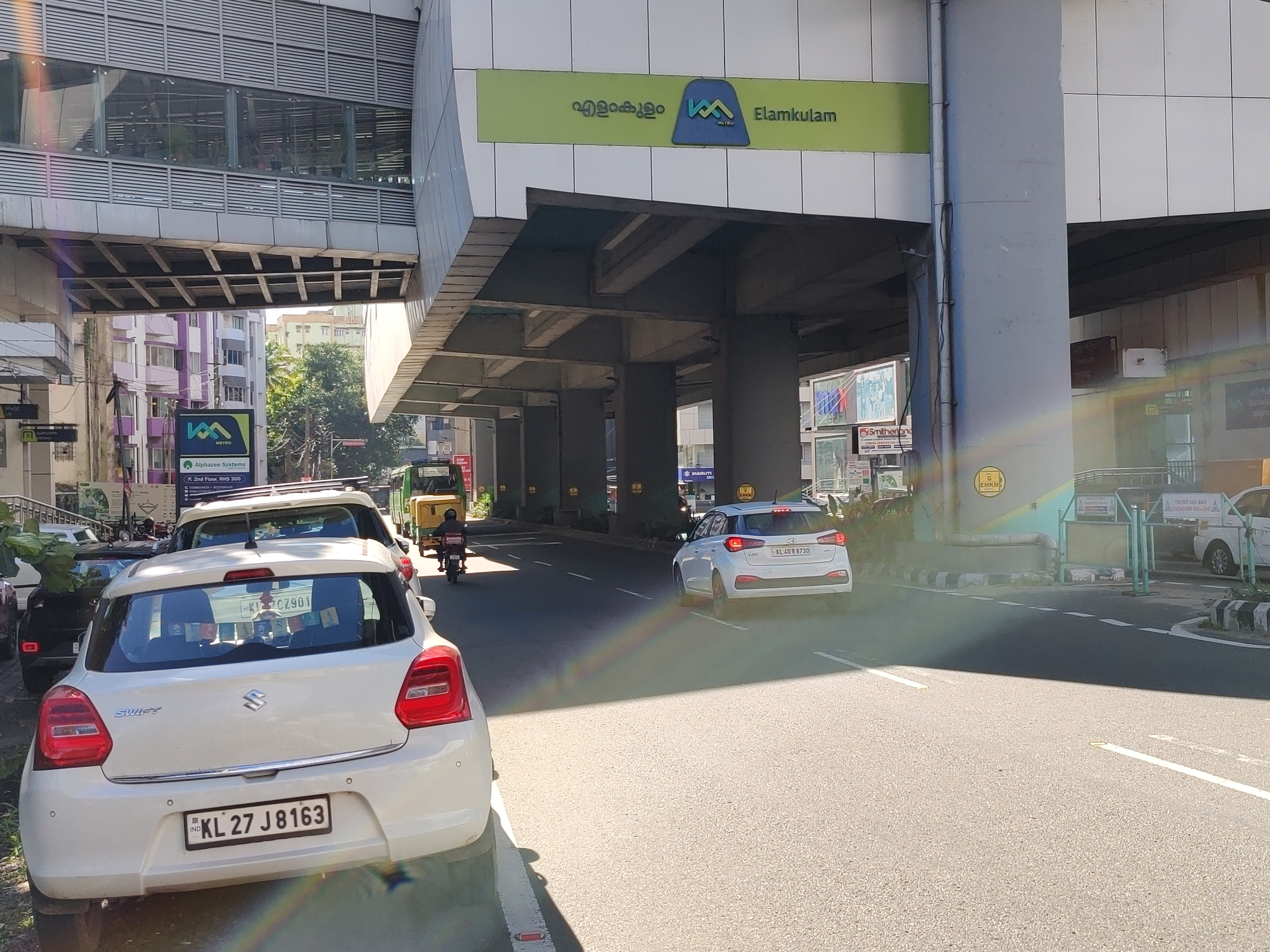

General information
- Location: Elamkulam, Kochi, Kerala; India
- Coordinates: 9.967001°N 76.307984°E
- System: Kochi Metro rapid transit
- Owner: Kochi Metro Rail Limited
- Operator: Kochi Metro Rail Limited
- Line: Line 1
- Platforms: 2 (side platforms)
- Tracks: 2

Construction
- Structure type: Elevated
- Platform levels: 3
- Accessible: Yes

History
- Opened: 4 September 2019; 7 years ago
- Electrified: 750 V DC third rail

Services
Preceding station	Kochi Metro	Following station
Kadavanthra towards Aluva	Line 1	Vyttila towards Thrippunithura Terminal
Route map
Location
- Location within Kochi

Elamkulam metro station is an elevated metro station on Line 1 of the Kochi Metro in Kochi, Kerala, India. It was opened on 4 September 2019 as part of the system's extension from Maharaja's College to Thaikoodam.

== Station layout ==
G	Street level	Exit/Entrance
L1	Mezzanine	Fare control, station agent, Metro Card vending machines, crossover
L2	Side platform | Doors will open on the left
L2	Platform 2 Southbound	Towards → Thrippunithura Terminal (next station: Vyttila)
L2	Platform 1 Northbound	Towards ← Aluva (next station: Kadavanthra)
L2	Side platform | Doors will open on the left
