= Mattancherry Water Metro Station =

Station of Kochi Water Metro

Mattancherry Water Metro Station മട്ടാഞ്ചേരി വാട്ടര്‍ മെട്രോ സ്റ്റേഷൻ
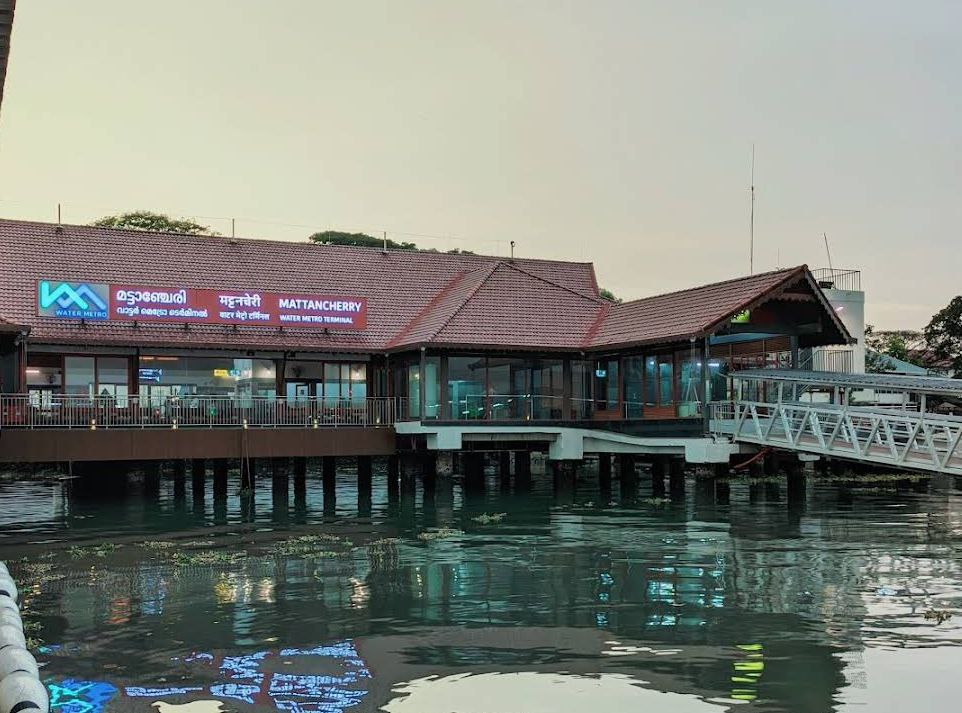

General information
- Location: Jew Town Road, Mattancherry, Kochi, Kerala; India
- Owner: Kochi Water Metro Limited
- Operator: Kochi Water Metro
- Manager: Kochi Metro Rail Limited
- Line: High Court -- Willingdon Island -- Mattancherry

History
- Opened: 11 October 2025

Mattancherry is a station of Kochi Water Metro. This station is connected with High Court Terminal by the water metro. It was inaugurated by the Chief Minister of Kerala, Pinarayi Vijayan on 11 October 2025.

Mattancherry terminal is situated near the heritage-listed Dutch Palace or Mattancherry Palace built by Portuguese during 16th century. The terminal is built entirely on water.

== Attractions Nearby ==
- Dutch Palace or Mattancherry Palace
- Paradesi Synagogue
- Kadavumbhagam Mattancherry Synagogue
- Jew Town
- Jewish Cemetery
- St. George Coonan Cross (Koonan Kurishu) Old Syrian Orthodox Church
- Dharmanath Jain Temple
