= Willingdon Island Water Metro Station =

Station of Kochi Water Metro

Willingdon Island Water Metro Station വെല്ലിംഗ്ഡണ്‍ അയലന്‍ഡ്‌ വാട്ടര്‍ മെട്രോ സ്റ്റേഷൻ

General information
- Location: Willingdon Island,Kochi,Kerala; India
- Owner: Kochi Water Metro Limited
- Operator: Kochi Water Metro
- Manager: Kochi Metro Rail Limited
- Line: High Court -- Willingdon Island -- Mattancherry

History
- Opened: 11 October 2025

Willingdon Island is a station of Kochi Water Metro. This station is connected with High Court Terminal by the water metro. It was inaugurated by the Chief Minister of Kerala Pinarayi Vijayan on 11 October 2025.

The Willingdon Island terminal is located adjacent to the old ferry terminal. The terminal is built completely on water.
