= South Chittoor water metro station =

Ferry terminal in Kochi, India

South Chittoor water metro station സൗത്ത് ചിറ്റൂർ വാട്ടർ മെട്രോ സ്റ്റേഷൻ

General information
- Location: India
- Owner: Kochi Water Metro Limited
- Operator: Kochi Water Metro
- Manager: Kochi Metro Rail Limited

History
- Opened: 17 March 2024

South Chittoor is a station of Kochi Water Metro. Located in South Chittoor, the station was inaugurated by the Chief Minister Pinarai Vijayan on 14 March 2024 and opened for public on 17 April as a part of the first phase of the metro system.
