= Cheranallur water metro station =

Ferry terminal in Kochi, India

Cheranallur water metro station ചേരാനല്ലൂർ വാട്ടർ മെട്രോ സ്റ്റേഷൻ

General information
- Location: India
- Owner: Kochi Water Metro Limited
- Operator: Kochi Water Metro
- Manager: Kochi Metro Rail Limited

History
- Opened: 17 March 2024

Cheranallur is a station of Kochi Water Metro. Located in Cheranallur, the station was inaugurated by the Chief Minister Pinarai Vijayan on 14 March 2024 and opened for public on 17 April as a part of the first phase of the metro system.
