= Vypin water metro station =

Ferry terminal in Kochi, India

Vypin water metro station വൈപ്പിൻ വാട്ടർ മെട്രോ സ്റ്റേഷൻ
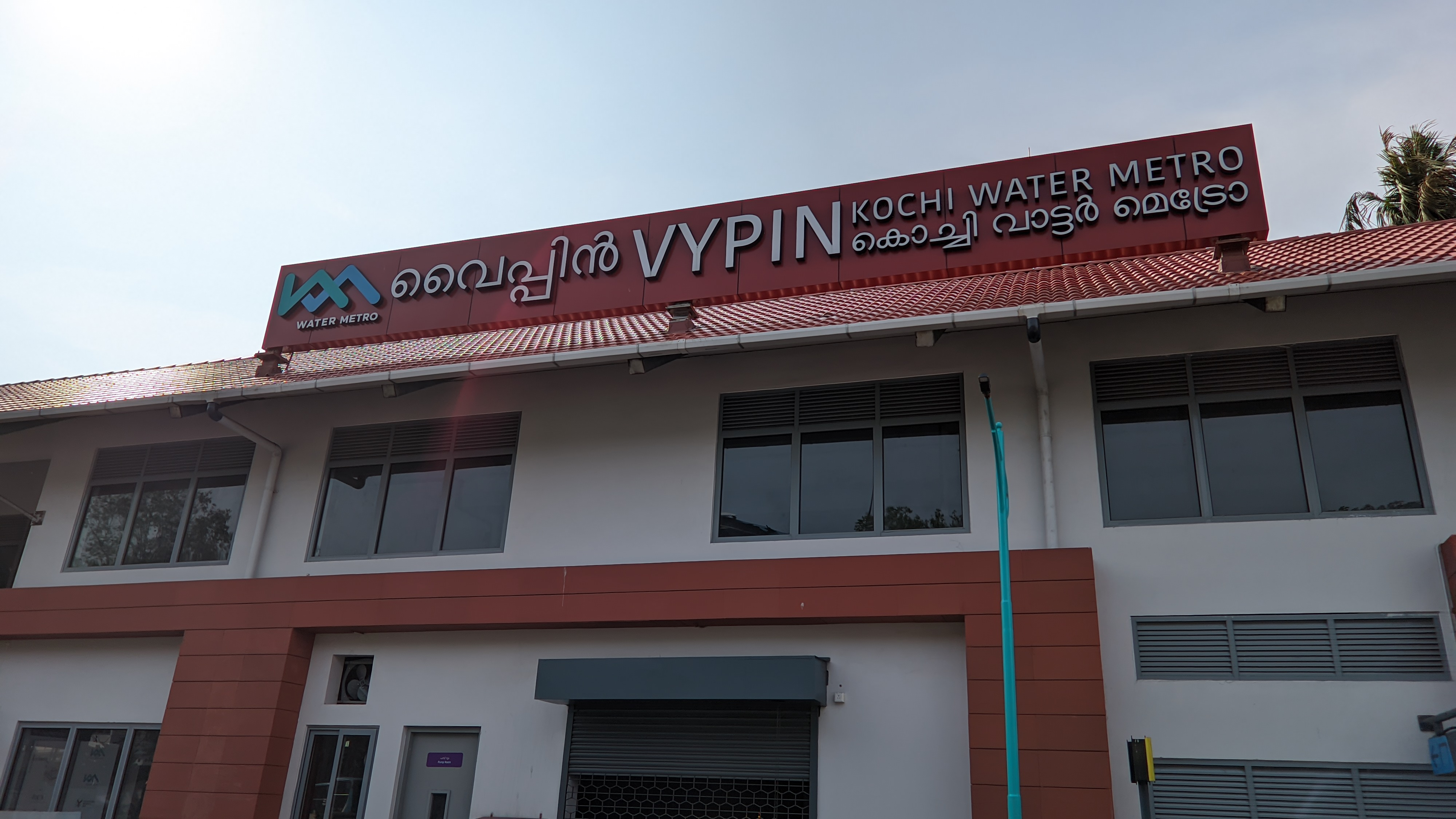
- Vypin station entrance

General information
- Location: India
- Owner: Kochi Water Metro Limited
- Operator: Kochi Water Metro
- Manager: Kochi Metro Rail Limited

History
- Opened: 26 April 2023

Vypin (വൈപ്പിൻ) is a station of Kochi Water Metro. It is located on the Vypin Island near to Fort Kochi - Vypin RoRo Jetty. The station was inaugurated by the Prime Minister of India Narendra Modi on 25 April 2023 and opened for public on 26 April as a part of the first phase of the water metro system.
