= Ernakulam South metro station =

Metro station in Kochi, India

Ernakulam South

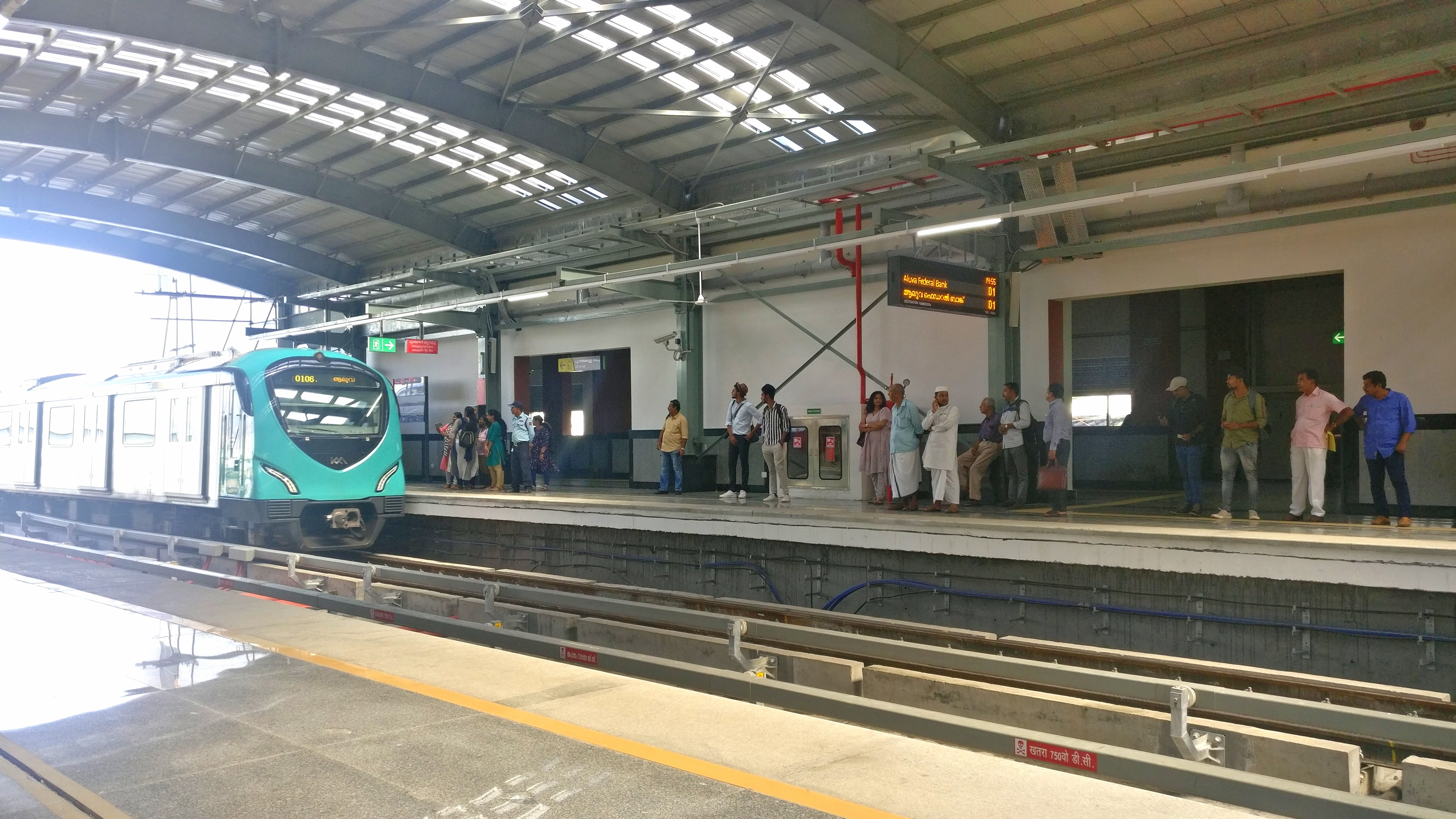

General information
- Coordinates: 9.968618°N 76.289452°E
- System: Kochi Metro
- Owner: Kochi Metro Rail Limited (KMRL)
- Connections: Ernakulam Junction

History
- Opened: 4 September 2019; 6 years ago

Services
Preceding station	Kochi Metro	Following station
Maharaja's College towards Aluva	Line 1	Kadavanthra towards Thrippunithura Terminal
Route map
Location
- Location within Kochi

Ernakulam South metro station is a metro station of Kochi Metro. It was opened on 4 September 2019 as a part of the extension of the metro system from Maharaja's to Thaikoodam. The Ernakulam Junction railway station is located near to this metro station.

== Station layout ==
G	Street level	Exit/Entrance
L1	Mezzanine	Fare control, station agent, Metro Card vending machines, crossover
L2	Side platform | Doors will open on the left
L2	Platform 2 Southbound	Towards → Thrippunithura Terminalnext station is Kadavanthra
L2	Platform 1 Northbound	Towards ← Aluva next station is Maharaja's College
L2	Side platform | Doors will open on the left
L2

== See also ==
- Ernakulam KSRTC Bus Station
