= Kadavanthra metro station =

Metro station in Kochi, India

Kadavanthra

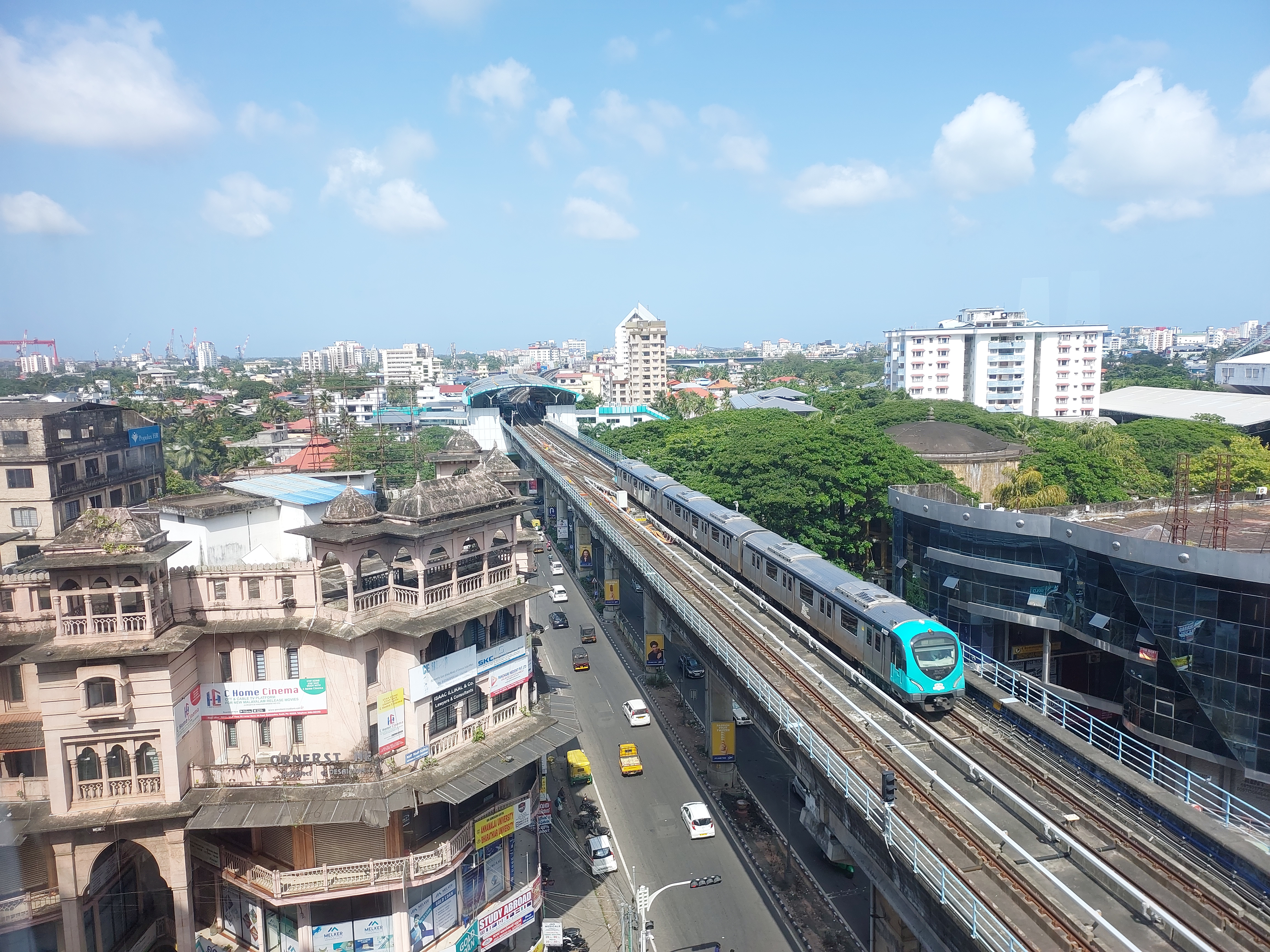
- View of Kadavanthra metro station from Olive Downtown Hotel

General information
- Coordinates: 9.966547°N 76.298185°E
- System: Kochi Metro rapid transit

History
- Opened: 4 September 2019; 6 years ago

Services
Preceding station	Kochi Metro	Following station
Ernakulam South towards Aluva	Line 1	Elamkulam towards Thrippunithura Terminal
Route map
Location
- Location within Kochi

Kadavanthra metro station is the 18th metro station of Kochi Metro from Aluva. It is a downtown station located at GCDA lawns catering passengers for Kadavanthra and Panampilly Nagar, situated in between Ernakulam South and Elamkulam metro stations. The station is based on the theme of "History of print media in Kerala". It was opened on 4 September 2019 as a part of the extension of the metro system from Maharaja's to Thaikoodam.

== Station layout ==
G	Street level	Exit/Entrance
L1	Mezzanine	Fare control, station agent, Metro Card vending machines, crossover
L2	Side platform | Doors will open on the left
L2	Platform 2 Southbound	Towards → Thrippunithura Terminal next station is Elamkulam
L2	Platform 1 Northbound	Towards ← Aluva next station is Ernakulam South
L2	Side platform | Doors will open on the left
L2
