= Vyttila metro station =

Metro station in Kochi, India

Vyttila

General information
- Coordinates: 9.967498°N 76.320409°E
- System: Kochi Metro rapid transit
- Connections: Vyttila; Vyttila Mobility Hub

History
- Opened: 4 September 2019; 6 years ago

Services
Preceding station	Kochi Metro	Following station
Elamkulam towards Aluva	Line 1	Thaikoodam towards Thrippunithura Terminal
Route map
Location
- Location within Kochi

Vyttila metro station is a metro station of Kochi Metro. It was opened on 4 September 2019 as a part of the extension of the metro system from Maharaja's to Thaikoodam. Vyttila water metro station and Vyttila Mobility Hub are located adjacent to the Vyttila metro station.

== Station layout ==
G	Street level	Exit/Entrance
L1	Mezzanine	Fare control, station agent, Metro Card vending machines, crossover
L2	Side platform | Doors will open on the left
L2	Platform 2 Southbound	Towards → Thrippunithura Terminal next station is Thaikoodam
L2	Platform 1 Northbound	Towards ← Aluva next station is Elamkulam
L2	Side platform | Doors will open on the left
L2
