= Vyttila water metro station =

Ferry terminal in Kochi, India

Vyttila water metro station വൈറ്റില വാട്ടർ മെട്രോ സ്റ്റേഷൻ
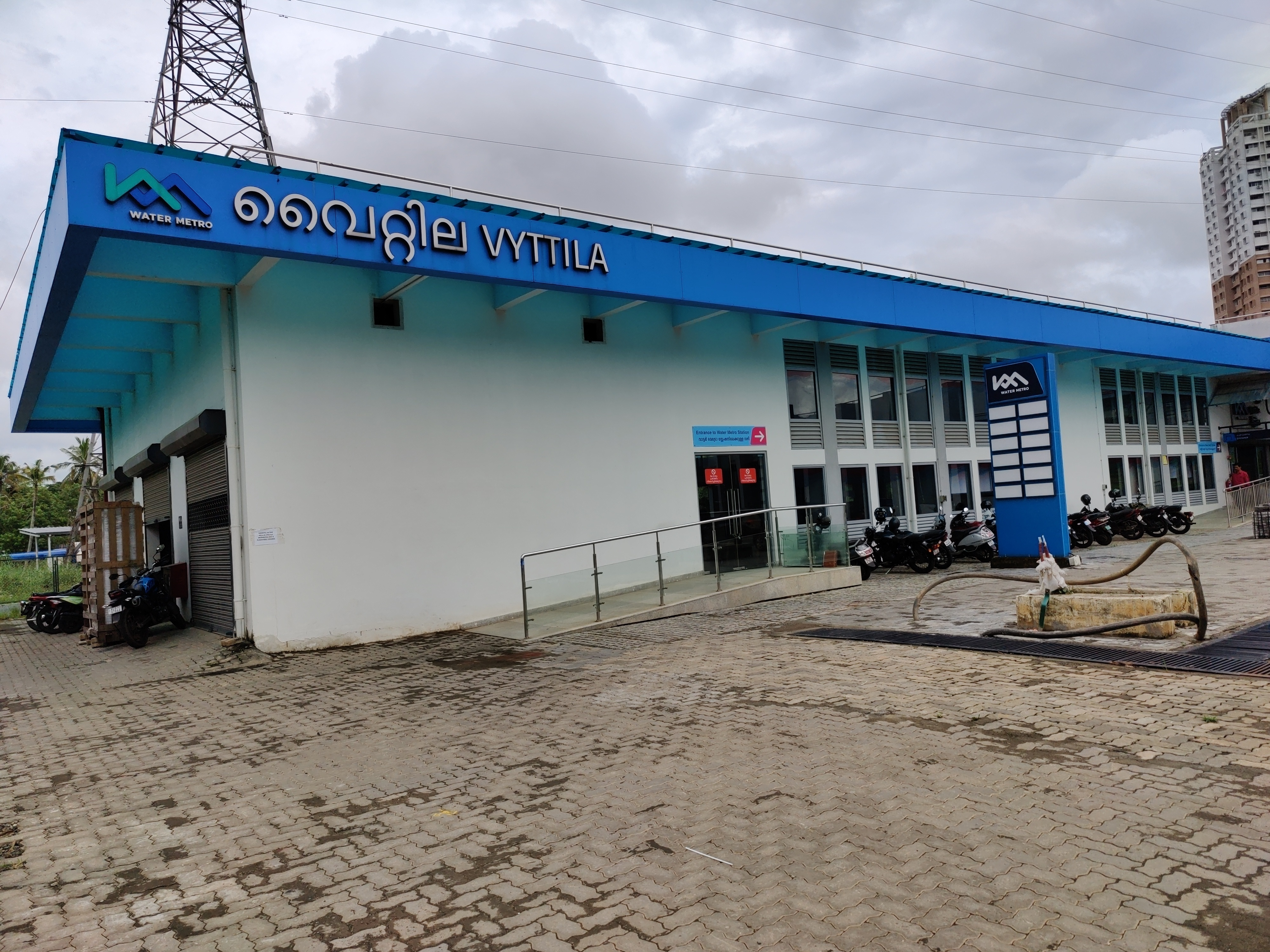
- Vyttila water metro station

General information
- Location: India
- Coordinates: 9.969°N 76.321°E
- Owner: Kochi Water Metro Limited
- Operator: Kochi Water Metro
- Manager: Kochi Metro Rail Limited
- Connections: Blue Line Vytilla; Vyttila Mobility Hub

History
- Opened: 27 April 2023
Location
- Location within Kochi

Vyttila is a station of Kochi Water Metro. The station is located adjacent to Vyttila metro station and Vyttila mobility hub. It was inaugurated by the Prime Minister of India Narendra Modi on 25 April 2023 and opened for public on 27 April as a part of the first phase of the water metro system.
