= KMRL =

KMRL may refer to:

- Kochi Metro Rail Limited, an Indian railway company
- KMRL (FM), a radio station (91.9 FM) licensed to serve Buras, Louisiana, United States
