= Water transport in India =

Water transport in India has played a significant role in the country's economy and is indispensable to foreign trade. India is endowed with an extensive network of waterways in the form of rivers, canals, backwaters, creeks and a long coastline accessible through the seas and oceans. It has the largest carrying capacity of any form of transport and is most suitable for carrying bulky goods over long distances.

It is one of the cheapest modes of transport in India, as it takes advantage of natural track and does not require huge capital investment in construction and maintenance except in the case of canals. Its fuel efficiency contributes to lower operating costs and reduced environmental impact due to carbon. India has 14,500 kilometres or 9,000 miles of inland waterways, out of which 5,685 kilometres or 3,530 miles are navigable by mechanized vessels etc.

Since 1947, India has made great progress in shipping and gradually became the second largest shipping country in Asia and sixth largest in the world. Indian ships ply on most of the shipping route of the world. India has a 6,100 kilometres (3,790 mi)-long coastline with only twelve major ports: Mumbai, Kandla, Jawaharlal Nehru Port (at Nehru Seve), Marmagaon, New Mangalore and Kochi on the west coast, alongside Kolkata, Chennai, Haldia, Paradeep, Vishakhapatnam and Tuticorin on the east coast.

Jawaharlal Nehru Port of Mumbai has been developed as one of the major ports. It is the only fully mechanized port of India. The biggest port is Mumbai which handles largest number of ships as well as trade. Kandla port in Gujarat compensates the loss of the Port of Karachi to Pakistan. Vishakhapatnam is the third largest port of India. Kolkata is the largest inland port of Asia.

Inland Waterways Authority of India has a vision to raise India's 111 national waterway's current cargo handling capacity from 55 MT in 2017–18 and 72 MT in 2018–19 to 100 MT by 2021–22.

== Benefits of waterways transport ==
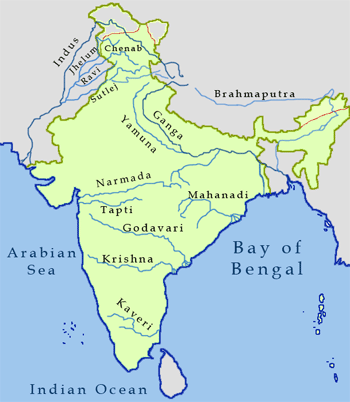
Major rivers of India

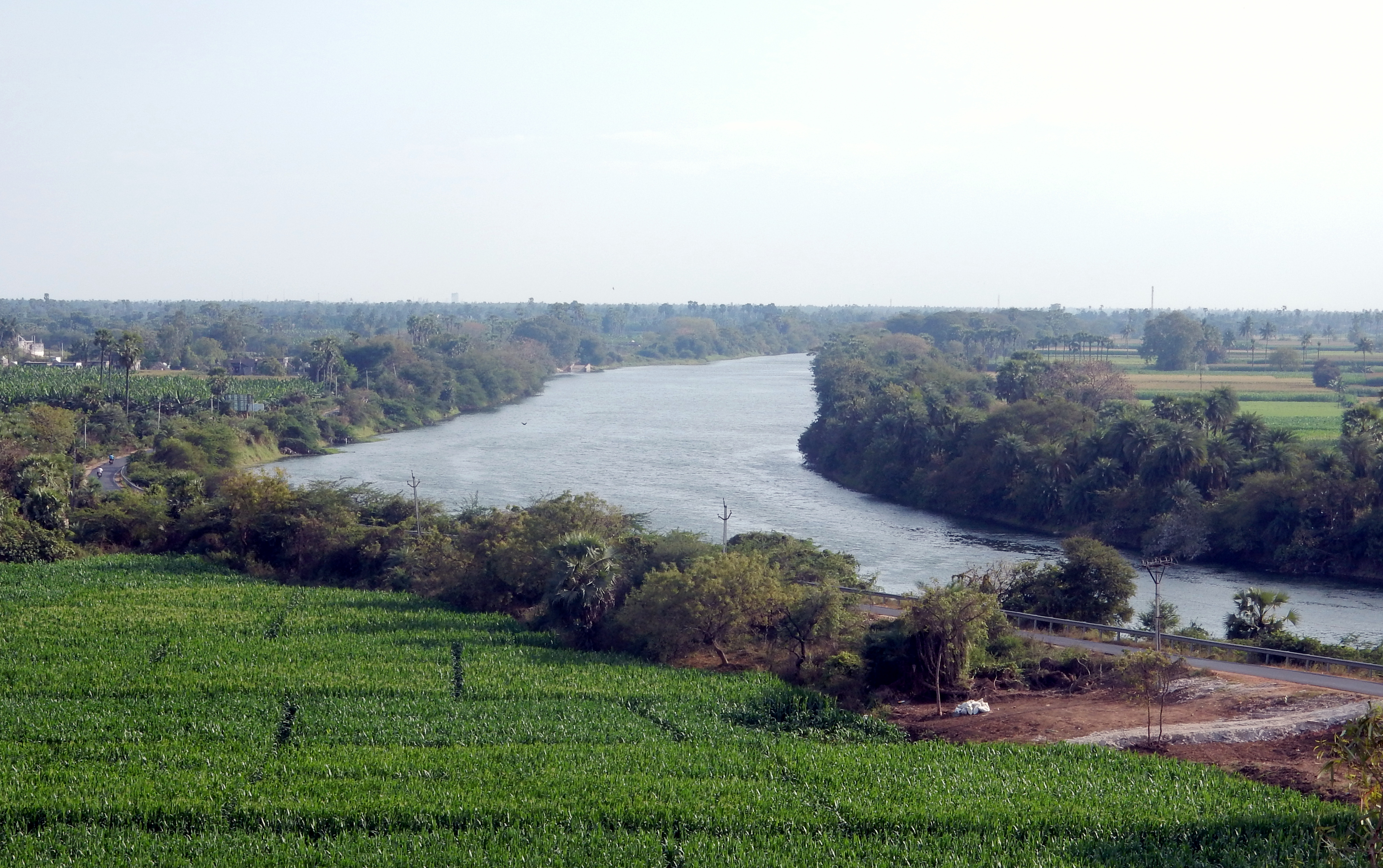
Buckingham Canal in Andhra Pradesh

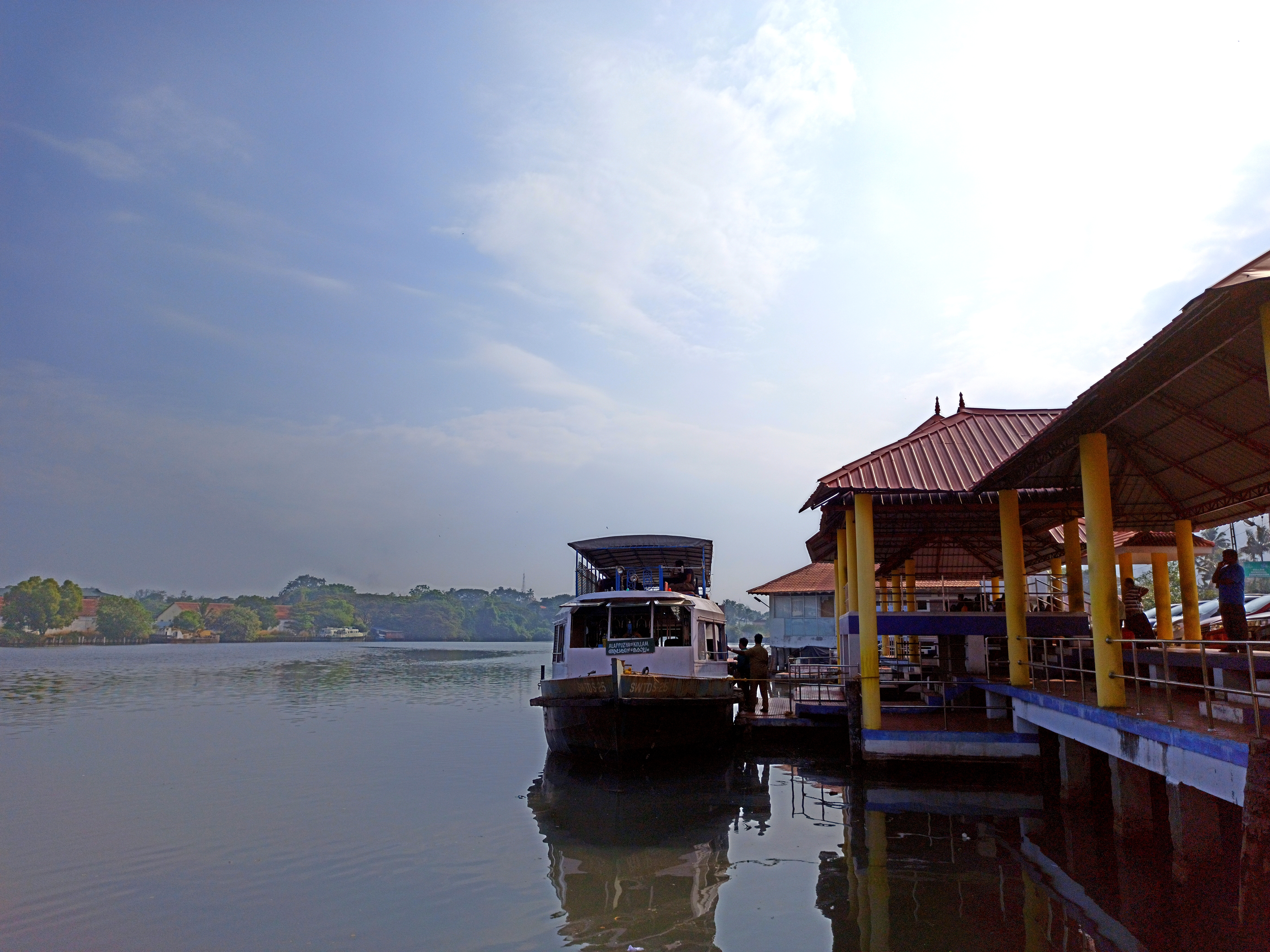
A passenger ferry at Kollam Ferry Terminal in Kerala

The cost of water transport in India is roughly 50 paise (0.52¢ US) a kilometre, as compared to ₹1 (1.0¢ US) by railways and ₹1.5 (1.6¢ US) by roads. Water transport has received significant attention in recent times as logistical costs in India are some of the highest among major countries—18 percent in India versus 8-10 percent in China and 10-12 percent in the European Union. To increase the share of waterways in inland transport, the National Waterways Act, 2016 was passed which proposed 106 additional National Waterways. This has the potential to greatly reduce the cost of transportation and lower the nation's carbon footprint by moving traffic from surface roads and railroads to waterways. Prime Minister Narendra Modi launched the first Ro-Ro ferry service in Gujarat in October 2017.

Freight transport by waterways is highly under-utilized in India compared to other large countries and geographic areas such as the United States, China and the European Union. The total cargo moved (in tonne kilometres) by inland waterways was 0.1 percent of the total inland traffic in India, compared to the 21 percent figure for the United States.

== Inland waterways ==
India has an extensive network of inland waterways in the form of rivers, canals, backwaters and creeks. The total navigable length is 14,500 km (9,000 mi), out of which about 5,200 km (3,200 mi) of river and 4,000 km (2,500 mi) of canal can be used by mechanized crafts. About 44 million tonnes (49,000,000 short tons) of cargo are moved annually through these waterways using mechanized vessels and country boats.

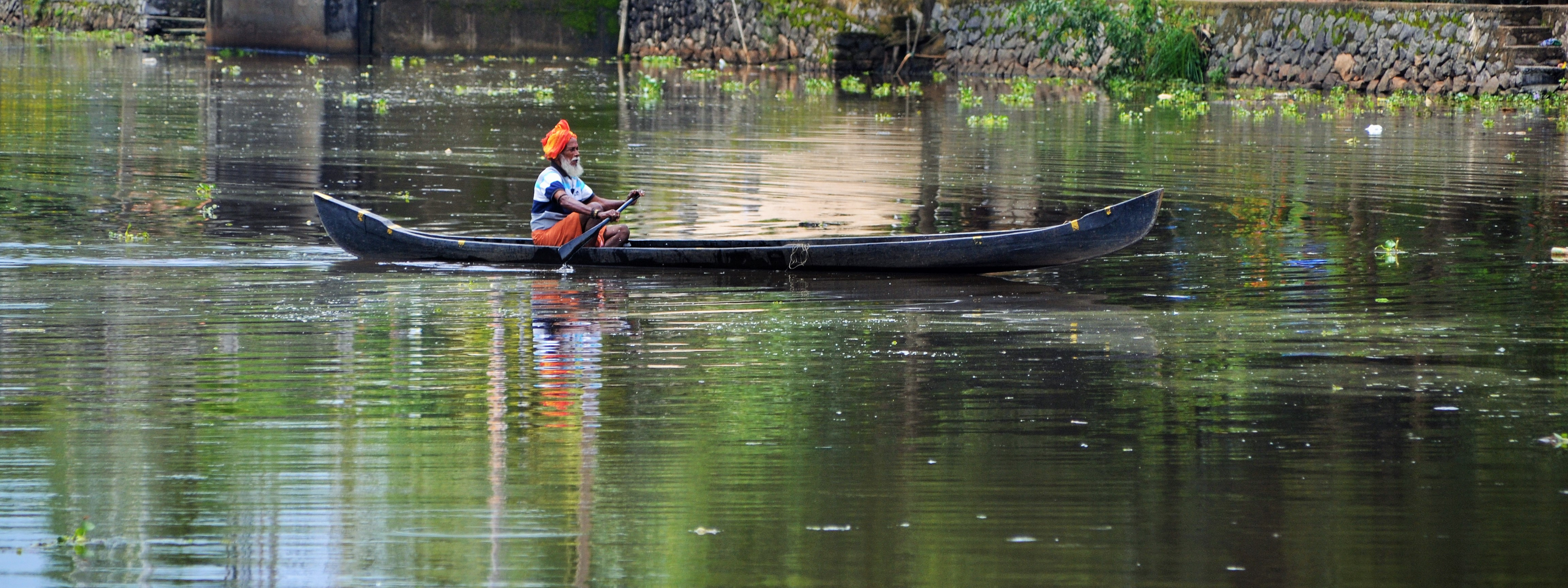
A villager using a wooden boat to travel through the backwaters of Allapuzha, Kerala.

Cargo transported in an organized manner is confined to a few waterways in Goa, West Bengal, Assam and Kerala. Inland waterways consist of the Ganges-Bhagirathi-Hooghly rivers, the Brahmaputra, the Barak river, the rivers in Goa, the backwaters in Kerala, inland waters in Mumbai and the deltaic regions of the Godavari-Krishna rivers.

Participation of government agencies, public & private sector enterprises in IWT/NW development
Vessels / terminals	Construction, operation & maintenance	Government agencies	Public sector enterprises	Private sector enterprises
Waterway	Constructing of waterway	IWAI (Note: Inland Waterways Authority of India)	CIWTC (Note: Central Inland Water Transport Corporation) in Sundarbans	-
Waterway	Maintenance of Waterway	IWAI	Subcontracted Dredging	Subcontracted Dredging
Waterway	Navigational Support	IWAI	Ports, near port areas GPS suppliers (KPT, Port of Panaji)	-
Carriers (Vessels)	Vessel Manufacturing	–	CIWTC, Hooghly Docks, Garden Reach Shipbuilders & Engineers (GRSE)	Several
Carriers (Vessels)	Vessel ownership	IWAI	CIWTC/KSINCL (Note: Kerala State Inland Navigation Company Limited) and others	Several
Carriers (Vessels)	Vessel maintenance/repair	–	CIWTC/KSINCL and others	Several
Carriers (Vessels)	Vessel Operation	–	CIWTC/KSINCL and others	Several
Terminals (Jetties)	Terminal construction	IWAI and State Government	Mormugao Port Trust, CIWTC	Several
Terminals (Jetties)	Terminal operation	–	Mormugao Port Trust	Several

== Coastal and coastline waterways ==
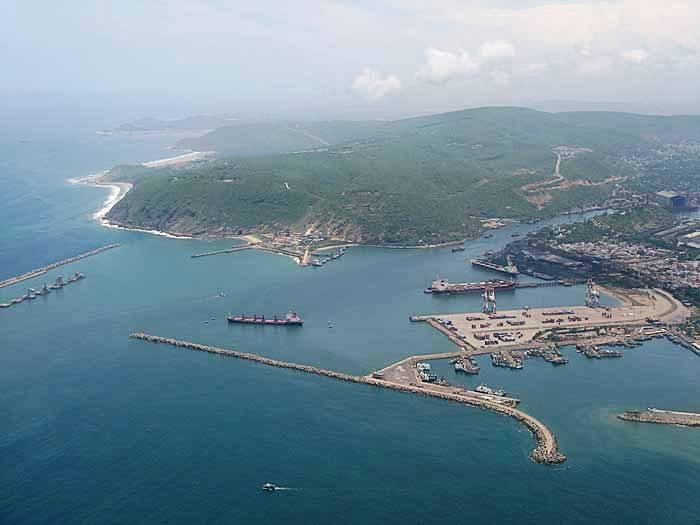
Visakhapatnam seaport is one of the busiest ports on the east coast of India

Transport facilities available by ship along India's vast coastline are part of the coastal shipping system. Coastal shipping is one of the most important aspects of Indian Transport system. The country has a coastline of nearly 7,517 kilometres or 4,671 miles including the coastline of Andaman & Nicobar Islands and Lakshadweep Island. India has the largest merchant shipping fleet among developing countries and ranks 19th worldwide. Past decades saw a sharp decline in the country's coastal shipping operation. In 1961, there were 97 ships and in 1980 the number was down to 56. The shipping policy committee has recommended that Indian ships secure 100% of the country's coastal trade.

== Water metros ==
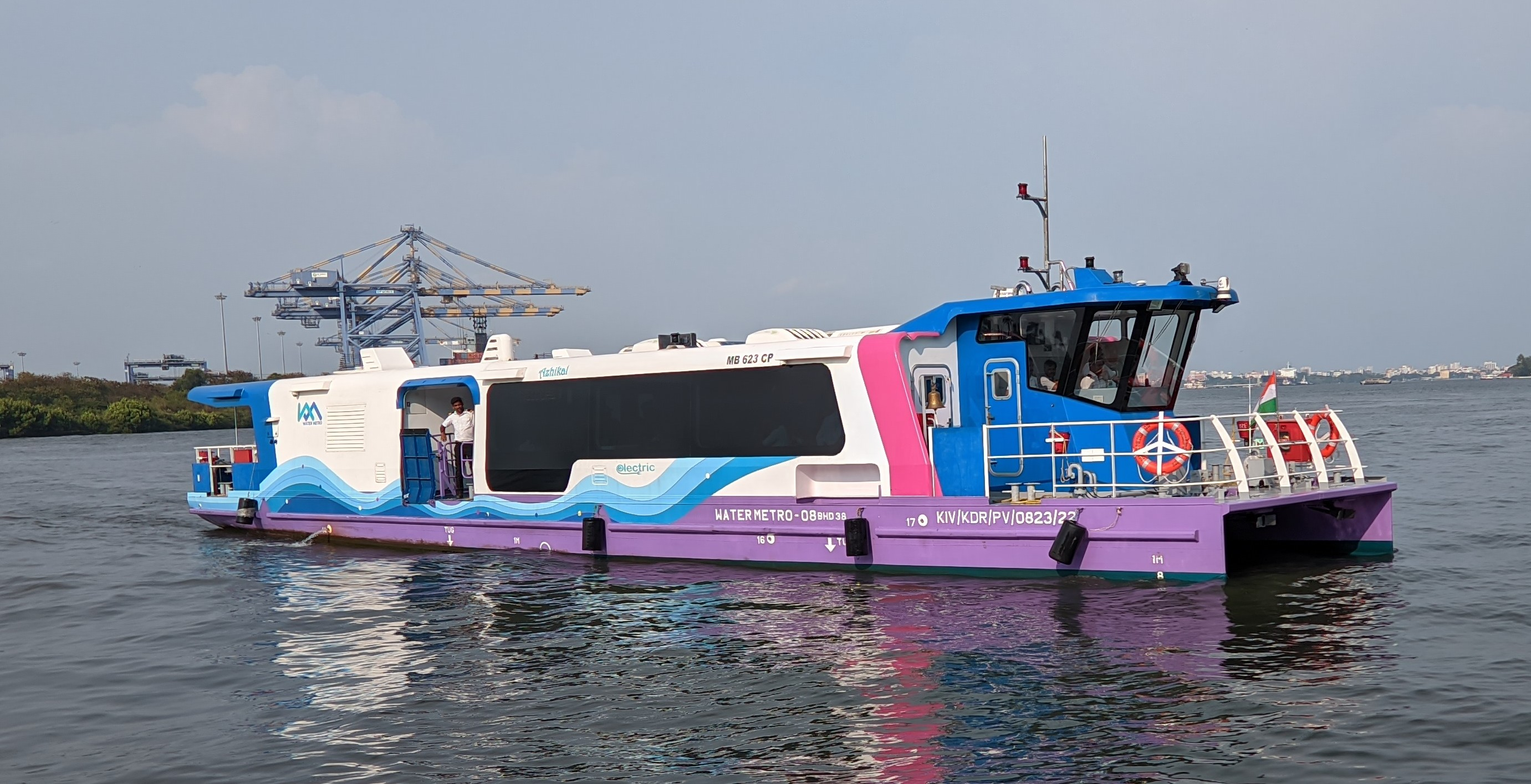
Kochi Water Metro

Water metro in India is a system of integrated ferry transport across India using battery-operated electric hybrid boats. In 2025, Kochi Water Metro Limited, which operates the only such system in the country, the Kochi Water Metro started undertaking feasibility studies for water metros in 18 cities across 11 states and two Union Territories. Existing and planned water metro in India including the following (alphabetically listed by state):

- Andaman and Nicobar Islands
  - Andaman and Nicobar Islands Water Metro, DPR being prepared as of September 2025.
- Assam
  - Guwahati Water Metro, DPR being prepared as of September 2025.
  - Dhubri Water Metro, DPR being prepared as of September 2025.
- Bihar
  - Patna Water Metro, DPR being prepared as of September 2025.
- Goa:
  - Goa Water Metro, DPR being prepared as of September 2025.
- Gujarat
  - Ahmedabad Water Metro, DPR being prepared as of September 2025.
- Jammu and Kashmir
  - Srinagar Water Metro, DPR being prepared as of September 2025.
- Karnataka
  - Mangalore Water Metro, DPR being prepared as of September 2025.
- Kerala
  - Alappuzha (Alleppey): Kerala
  - Kochi Water Metro (KWM), operational, India's first water metro system.
  - Kollam Water Metro, DPR being prepared as of September 2025.
- Maharashtra,
  - Mumbai Water Metro, detailed project report (DPR) being prepared as of September 2025 for 250 km of waterways, with 29 terminals and 10 proposed routes across Vaitarna, Vasai, Manori, Thane, Panvel, and Karanja rivers and estuaries.
- Uttar Pradesh
  - Ayodhya Water Metro, DPR being prepared as of September 2025.
  - Prayagraj Water Metro, DPR being prepared as of September 2025.
  - Varanasi Water Metro, DPR being prepared as of September 2025.
- West Bengal
  - Kolkata Water Metro, DPR being prepared as of September 2025.

== See also ==
- Bharatmala, Road transport in India
- Expressways of India
- Setu Bharatam, river road bridge development in India
- Rail transport in India
- Sagar Mala project, national water port development connectivity scheme
- Transport in India
- UDAN, national airport development connectivity scheme
