= Mumbai Water Metro =

Proposed ferry system in Mumbai

The Mumbai Water Metro is a proposed Integrated ferry system to be built in Mumbai, India

== History ==
On 13 September 2025, Kochi Metro Rail limited won a tender to conduct a feasibility study and prepare a Detailed Project Report for replication of Water Metro Services to Mumbai.The project will cover nearly 250 km of waterways connecting localities such as the Mumbai Port, Karanja, Vaitarna, Vasai, Manori, Thane Kalyan, Navi Mumbai, Bandra, Worli and Panvel on 250 kilometres of waterways and include 21 routes, 49 terminals and 207 boats. If launched, project would be managed jointly by KMRL and the Maharashtra Maritime Board. KMRL has estimated the project to cost ₹6,067 crore during its bid submission. The project could launch as soon as December 2026.

The proposal received approval from Maharastra chief minister Devendra Fadnavis on March 17, 2026. The daily ridership has been projected at 44,000 passengers and be implement via a public-private partnership model. Infrastructure development costs are estimated to be ₹3,436 crore and vessels at ₹3,156 crore. An operations control centre will be set up at Kalher and Bhiwandi, with a backup facility at Fountain Junction in Mira-Bhayander. The construction works are expected to be done in Three phases, with completion of phase one by 2029, phase two by 2030 and the final phase by 2036. The proposed Passenger Water Transport system would be managed by KMRL and the MMB. The first phase would have 11 routes and 24 stations, which will be integrated with 25 pre-existing Boat Jettys. The total route length would increase to over 215 km from an proposed 128 km. The project envisages a fleet of 148 boats alongside six emergency response vessels. The Maharastra government signed a memorandum of understanding with Norway-based maritime technology company Hyke AS for development of advanced vessels for the Mumbai Water Metro project and explore the establishment of shipbuilding facilities in Maharashtra.

== See also ==
- Kochi Water Metro
- Water Transport in India
- Water Transport in Mumbai
- Mumbai Suburban
- Mumbai Metro
- Mumbai Monorail
