= Kochi Water Metro =

Integrated ferry transport system in Kochi, India

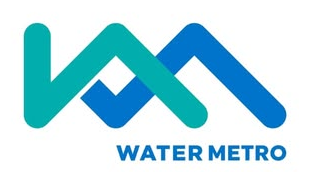

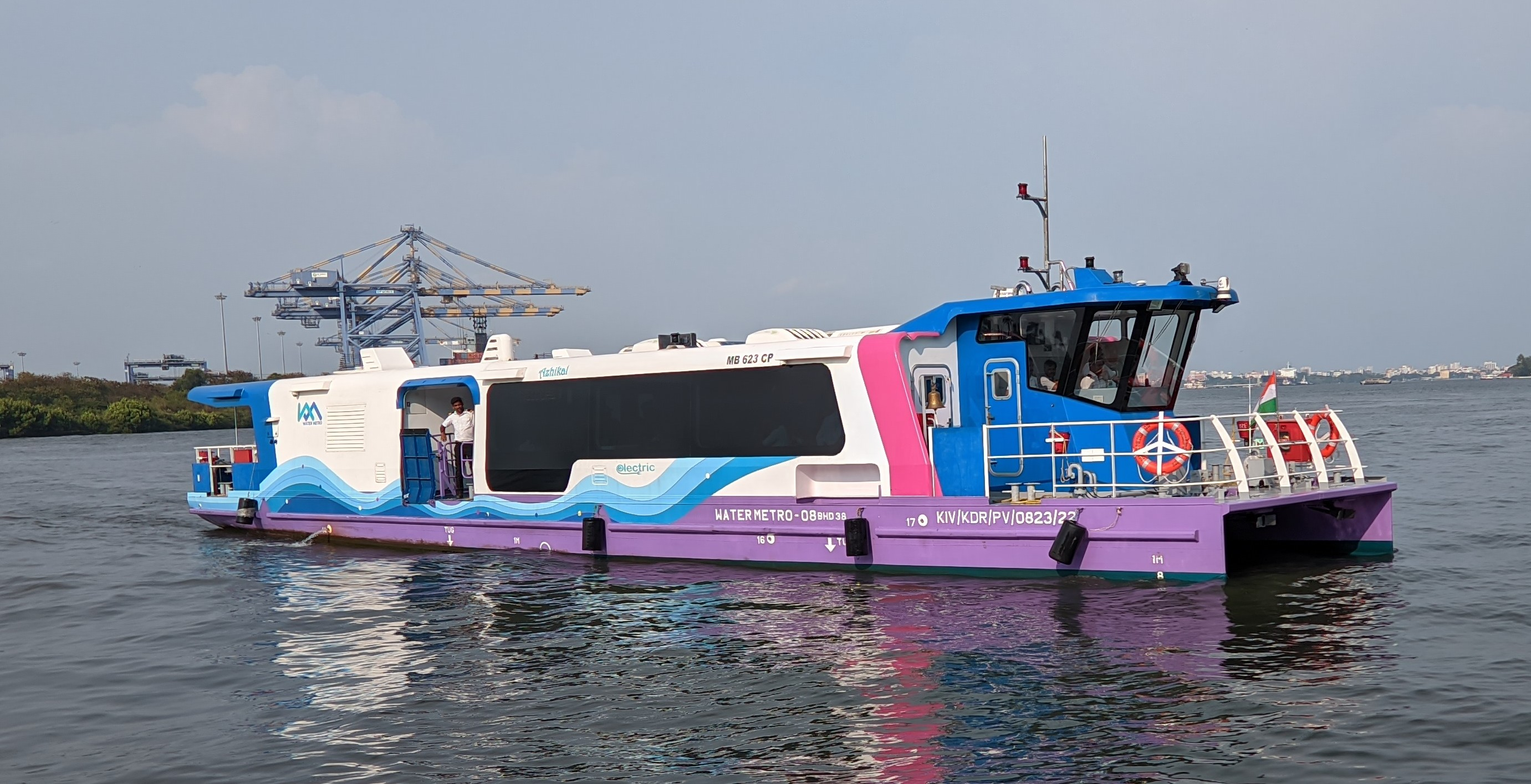

Overview
- Owner: Kochi Water Metro Limited
- Locale: Kochi, Kerala, India
- Transit type: Water metro
- Number of lines: 16 (planned); 6 (operational)
- Line number: Vypin--High Court; Vyttila--Kakkanad; South Chittoor--High Court; South Chittoor--Cheranelloor; High Court--Fort Kochi; High Court--Willingdon Island--Mattancherry
- Number of stations: 38 (total); 11 (operational)
- Daily ridership: 6752 (2025)
- Annual ridership: 24.6 lakh (2.46 million - 2025)
- Chief executive: G. Priyanka (MD, KMRL & District Collector, Ernakulam)
- Headquarters: J. L. N. Stadium metro station 4th Floor, Kaloor, Kochi, Kerala
- Website: KWM

Operation
- Began operation: 26 April 2023; 3 years ago
- Operator: Kochi Water Metro Limited
- Number of vehicles: 23
- Headway: 10–20 minutes

Technical
- System length: 76 km (47 mi) (once fully operational)
- Average speed: 8 knots (15 km/h)
- Top speed: 10 knots (19 km/h)

Kochi Water Metro is a passenger ferry system serving the city of Kochi and the Kochi Metropolitan Region in Kerala, India. It is the first water metro system in India and the first integrated water transport system of this size in Asia. When fully operational, it will connect Kochi's 10 islands with the mainland through a fleet of 78 hybrid electric boats operating along 38 terminals and 16 routes spanning 76 kilometres (47 mi). It is integrated with the Kochi Metro and serves as a feeder service to the suburbs along the rivers, backwaters and canals where transport access is limited.

Construction started in 2016, and the first route was inaugurated in February 2021 by Chief Minister Pinarayi Vijayan. It was officially inaugurated and opened to passengers by Prime Minister Narendra Modi on 25 April 2023. As of November 2026, the Kochi Water Metro had served over 8.1 million passengers.

== History ==
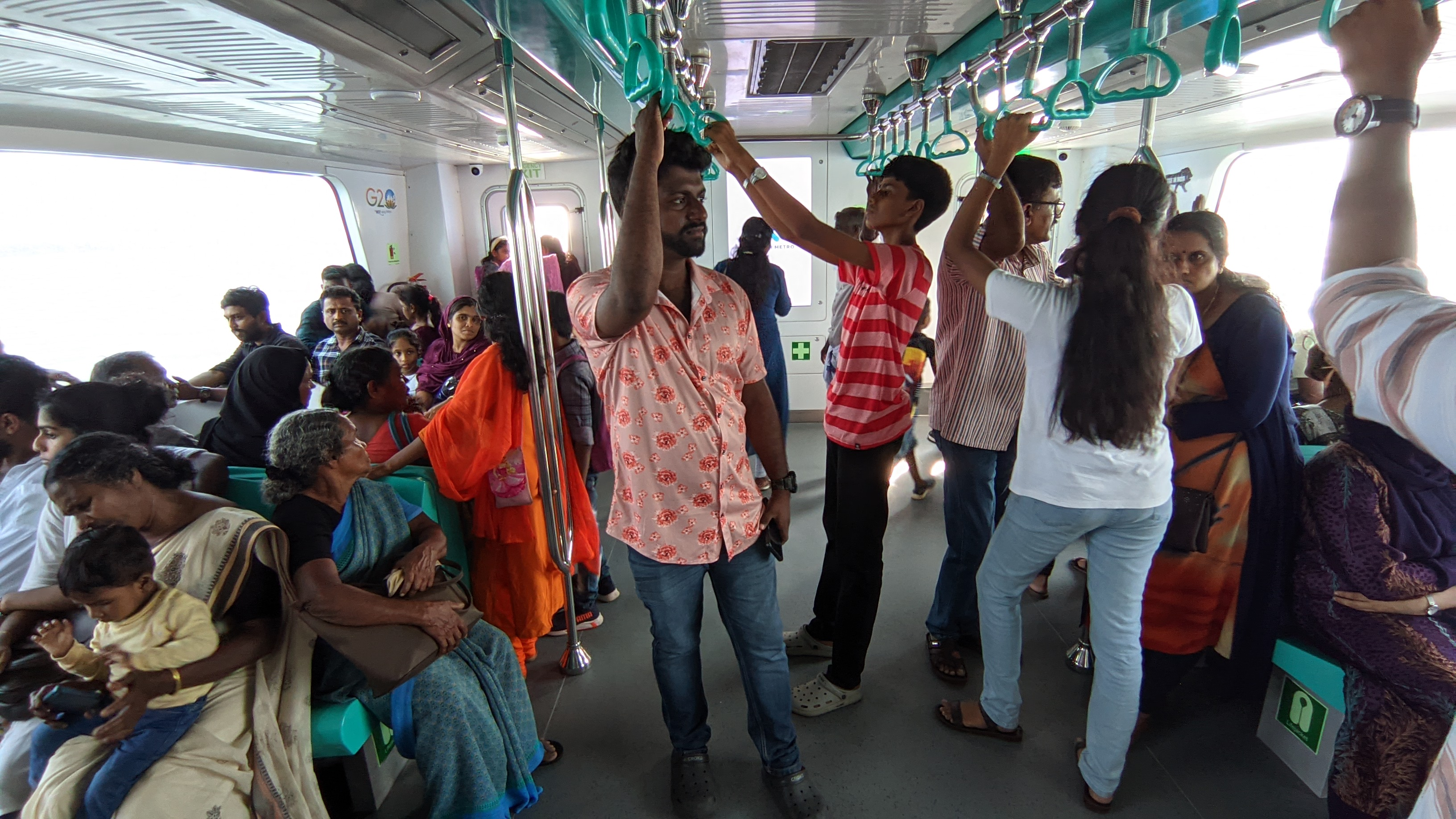
Passengers on a Kochi Water Metro boat

In 2020, the Kochi Water Metro ordered 23 electric ferries, as part of the first stage of a project to introduce 78 zero-emission vessels. The ferries were ordered to be built by Cochin Shipyard, with propulsion systems designed by Siemens and Echandia. Cochin Shipyard delivered the first of 23 electric ferries in January 2022.

Phase 1 consisted of three lines, of which the Vyttila-InfoPark was inaugurated on 15 February 2021. The Vypin-High Court line began service on 26 April 2023 and the Vyttila-Kakkanad line began service on 27 April 2023. Phase 1 was expected to be fully operational in 2024 and on becoming so, was expected to serve 34,000 passengers a day. The entire water metro system is expected to become fully operational by 2035 with a daily ridership of 1.5 lakh passengers. The annual carbon emissions are expected to reduce by 44,000 tonnes once the project is fully operational.

In January 2025, the Kochi Water Metro added an emergency response boat to its fleet, meant to respond to potential accidents, fires, and natural disasters.

== Routes and terminals ==
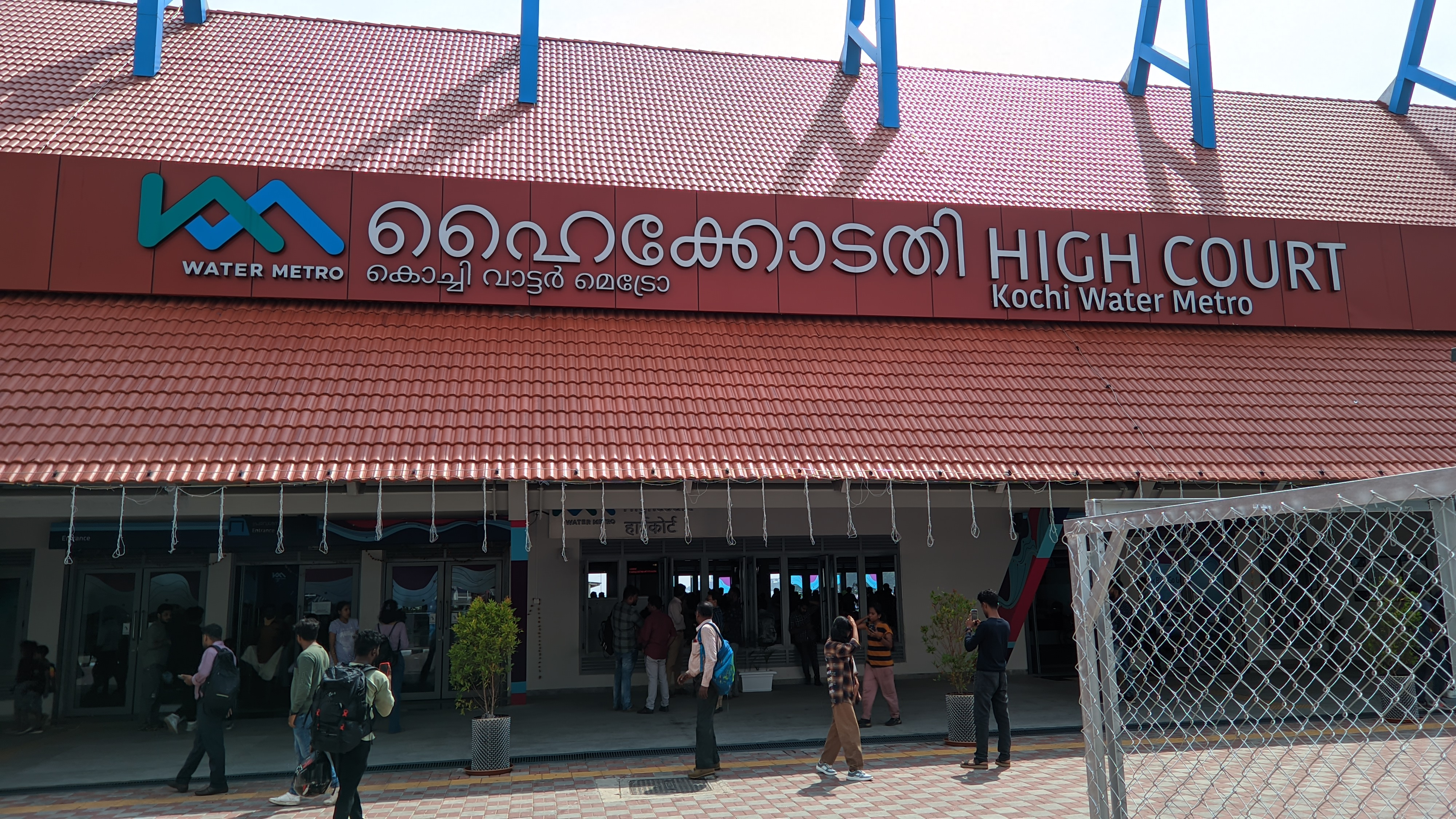
High Court water metro station

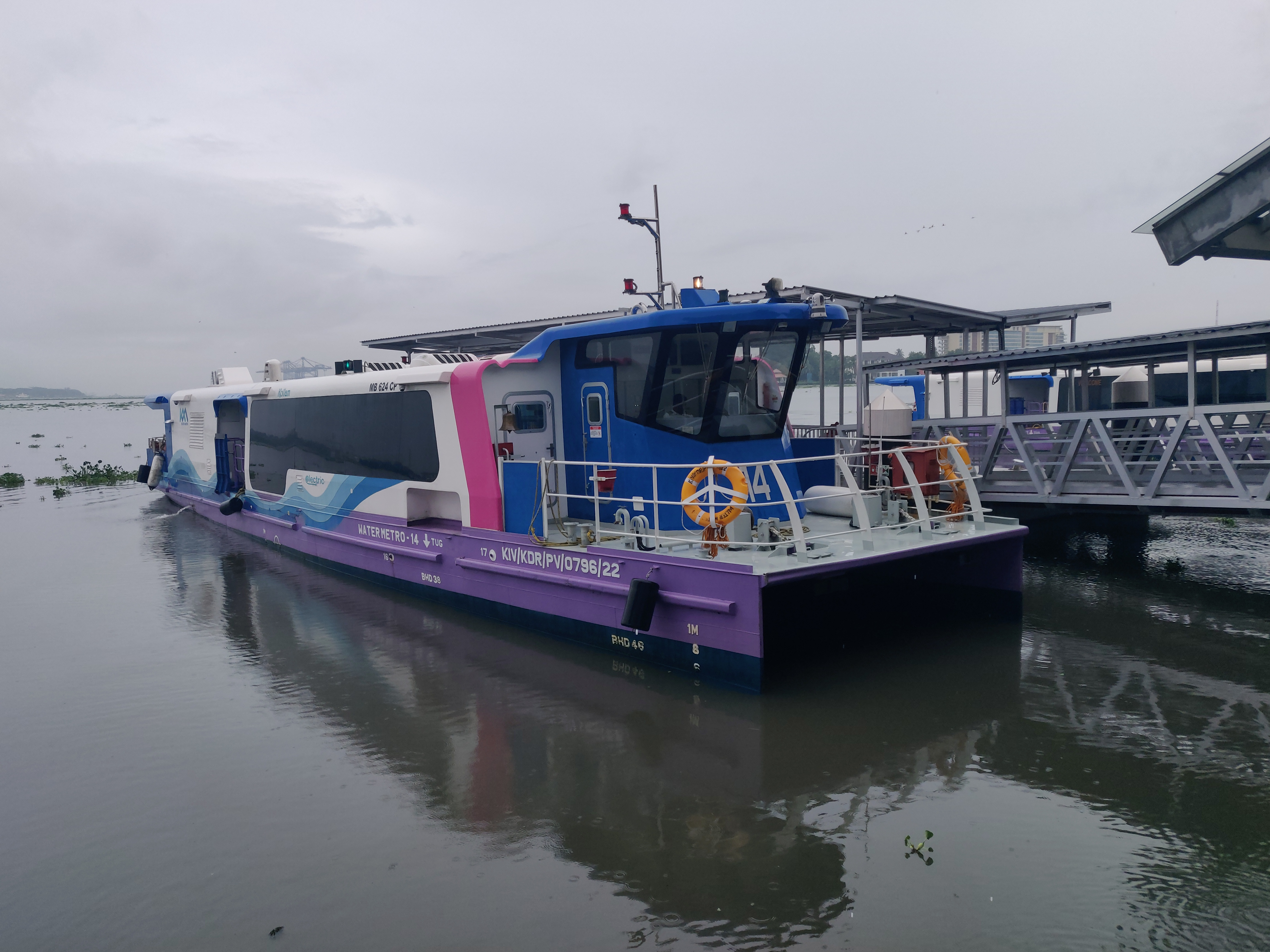
Kochi Water Metro boat at Highcourt Boat Jetty

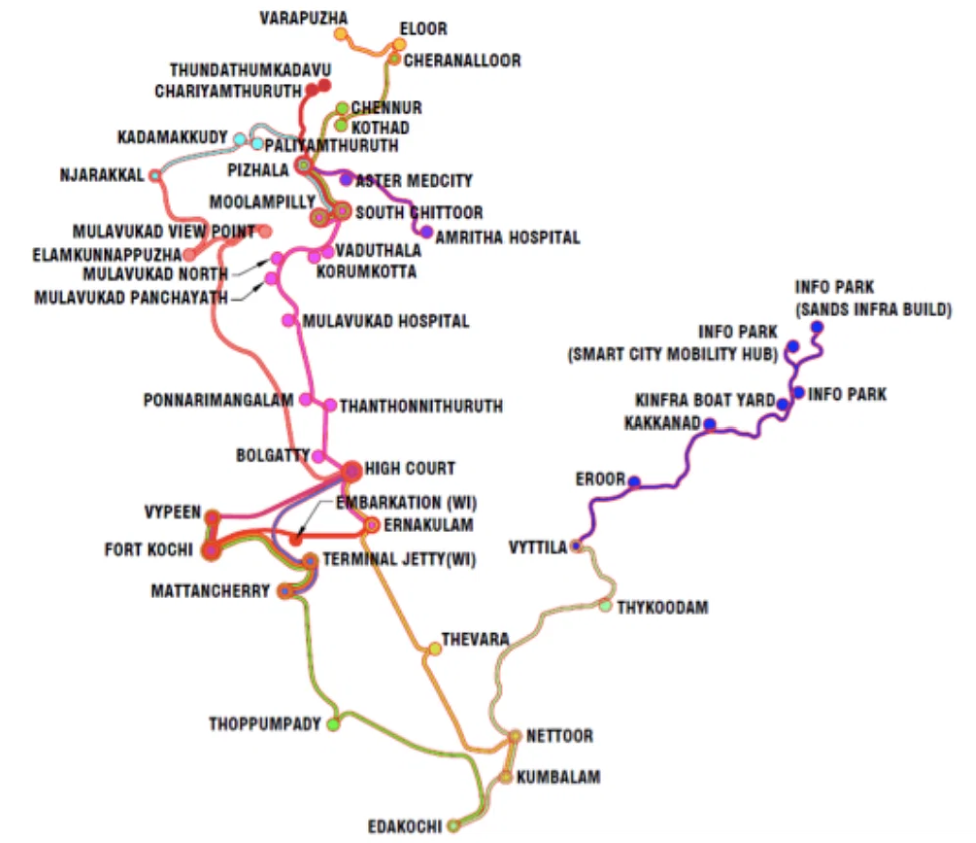
Route map of Kochi Water Metro

Kochi is mostly surrounded by backwaters and bordered by the Arabian Sea. It is interconnected by hundreds of waterways, which offers a way to make the public transport system much more accessible and environment friendly. The Water Metro is expected to solve the travel issues of the islanders of Willington, Kumbalam, Vypeen, Edakochi, Nettoor, Vyttila, Eroor, Kakkanad, and Mulavukad. A high-speed service connecting Aluva, Kalady and the Cochin International Airport via the Periyar river has been proposed.

- In the first phase, the water metro started sailing on two routes, High Court to Vypin and Vyttila to Kakkanad with eight electric-hybrid boats.
- On 14 March 2024, two new routes and four stations were inaugurated. One route is from High Court station to South Chittoor, through Bolgatty and Mulavukad North, while the other route is from South Chittoor to Cheranelloor through Eloor.
- On 11 October 2025, two new routes and two stations inaugurated: High Court to new Willindon Island station and High Court to new Mattancherry station.

=== Stations in service ===
	Station name	Image
1	Eloor	
2	Cheranallur	
3	South Chittoor	
4	High Court	
5	Vypin	
6	Fort Kochi	
7	Vyttila	
8	Kakkanad	
9	Willingdon Island	
10	Mattancherry	

=== Operantional routes ===
Operational routes
No.	Terminals		Stations	Distance (km)	Route Region
1	High Court	Vypin	2	3.4 km (2.1 mi)	Central Kochi - Kochi Coast
2	High Court	Fort Kochi	2	3.5 km (2.2 mi)	Central Kochi - Kochi Coast
3	High Court	Mattancherry	3 (via Willingdon Island)	4 km (2.5 mi)	Central Kochi - Kochi Coast
4	High Court	South Chittoor	4 (via Bolgatty, Mulavukadu North)	7 km (4.3 mi)	Central Kochi - North Kochi
5	South Chittoor	Eloor	3 (via Cheranallur)	5.2 km (3.2 mi)	North Kochi
6	Vyttila	Kakkanad	2	5.10 km (3.17 mi)	East Kochi

== Funding ==
The total cost of the Water Metro project is ₹1,137 crore (US$120 million). The KfW Development Bank will provide EUR 85 million as a long-term soft loan, and the Government of Kerala and KMRL will contribute ₹102 crore (US$11 million).

== Operations ==
=== Fare collection ===
The minimum ticket price of the metro system is 20 rupees and the maximum ticket charge is 40 rupees. Weekly passes are available at 180 rupees, whereas a monthly pass costs 600 rupees and a quarterly 1500. Single journey tickets and various travel passes are available in the terminals. Water Metro can be accessed using the Kochi Metro One card. It is also possible to travel using the mobile QR code booked through the Kochi One app. The automatic fare collection system being implemented by the Kochi Metro will be extended to water transport system which facilitates travelling the metro train and the boat using the same ticket.

During off-peak hours, Water Metro ferries are available for rent on an hourly basis for tourism.

=== Frequency ===
In the first phase, the service will be provided from 7 am to 8 pm. The service frequency is 15 minutes during peak hours. The headways vary between 10 minutes to 20 minutes across various routes.

=== Management ===
Kochi Water Metro Limited has been formed as a special purpose vehicle (SPV) with 74% of the shareholding being owned by the Kerala government and 26% by Kochi Metro Rail Limited (KMRL). It is operated and maintained by the KMRL.

== Infrastructure ==
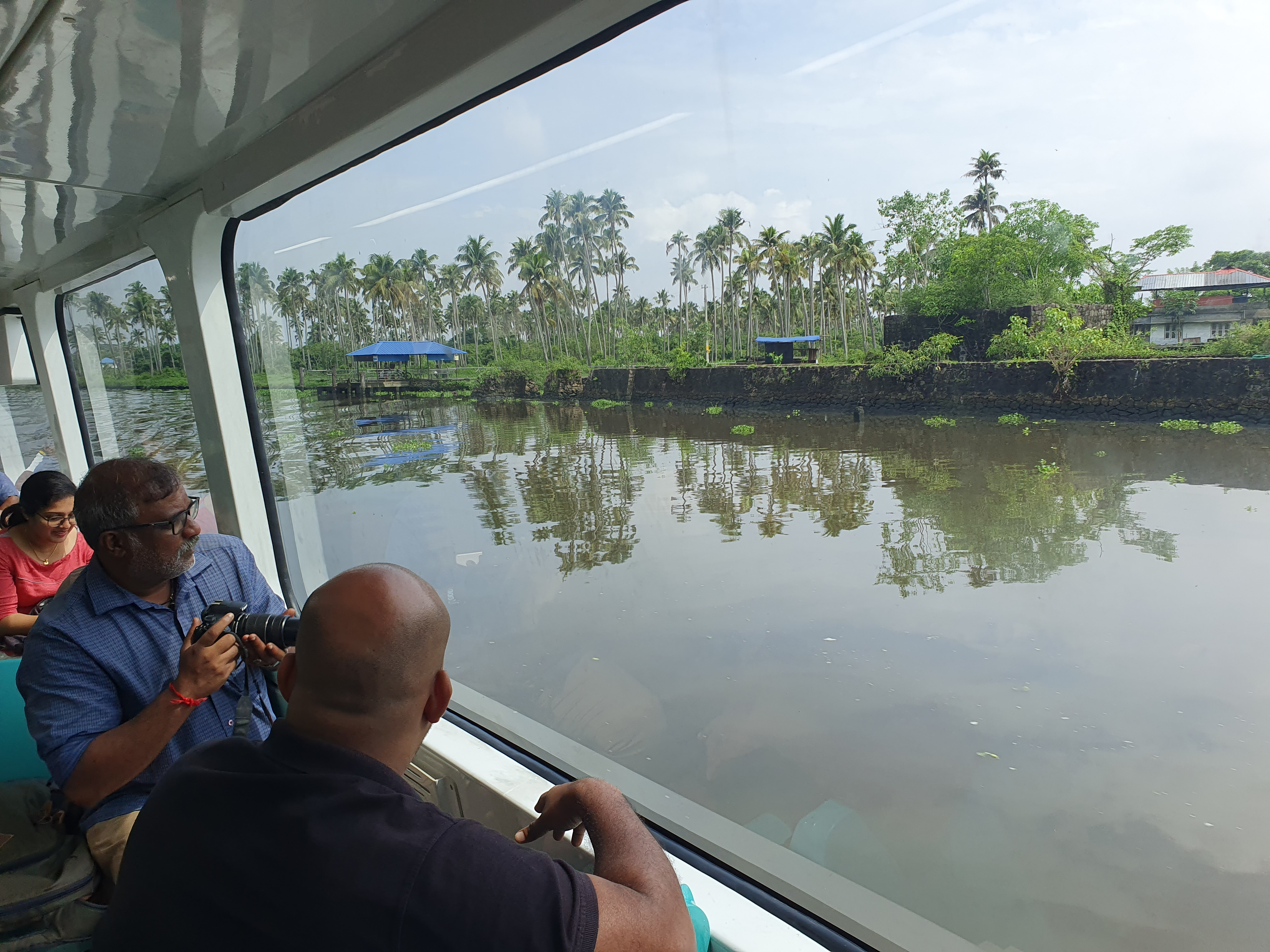
View from Kochi Water Metro ride

=== Fleet ===
Two variants of modernised air-conditioned and Wi-Fi enabled catamaran passenger boats were proposed for the project. The electric propulsion boats have passenger capacities of 50 and 100, and were designed to operate at an optimal speed of about 15 kilometres per hour (8.1 kn), with the potential to increase up to 19 kilometres per hour (10 kn). Of these, only the 100 passenger boats have been ordered for manufacturing, and for the 50 passenger capacity boats the builder is yet to be finalised. The boats are equipped with standard safety and communication devices. Small battery operated boats ply on the narrow lanes. The jetties are proposed to have floating pontoons with automatic docking system technology. The floating pontoons are covered with retractable sheds to provide comfort during the rainy season.

Kochi Water Metro has two types of boats that can carry 100 passengers and 50 passengers at a time. These boats have won the Gussis Electric Boat Award, an international award for electric boats. The boats and terminals are fully disabled-friendly. Kochi Water Metro has the innovation of a boat that can be operated in battery and hybrid mode. These boats are built in a hybrid system. Boats can be powered by a diesel generator in case of emergency.

Some of the Kochi Water Metro's electric boats are built by Cochin Shipyard, with propulsion systems designed by Siemens and Echandia.

In January 2025, the Kochi Water Metro added an emergency response boat to its fleet, meant to respond to potential accidents, fires, and natural disasters.

Kochi Water Metro is the first of its kind in the world to have such an extensive network of battery-powered boats. The boats use lithium titanate oxide batteries that can be charged very quickly and meet high safety standards. It can be charged in 10–15 minutes, and there is a facility to charge the batteries even when the passengers are boarding and disembarking. The speed of the boat is 8 knots in battery mode and 10 knots in hybrid mode.

A thermal camera is equipped to assist the boat operator during night travel. The boats are also equipped with radar. The passenger counting system is used to enter Kochi Water Metro boats to prevent the number of passengers from going over the designated level. Floating pontoons which can stay at the same level with the boats during high tide and low tide are the specialty of Kochi Water Metro. The rescue boats of the metro system are able to start rescue operations within 10 minutes in case of any kind of accident.

=== Operation Control Centre ===
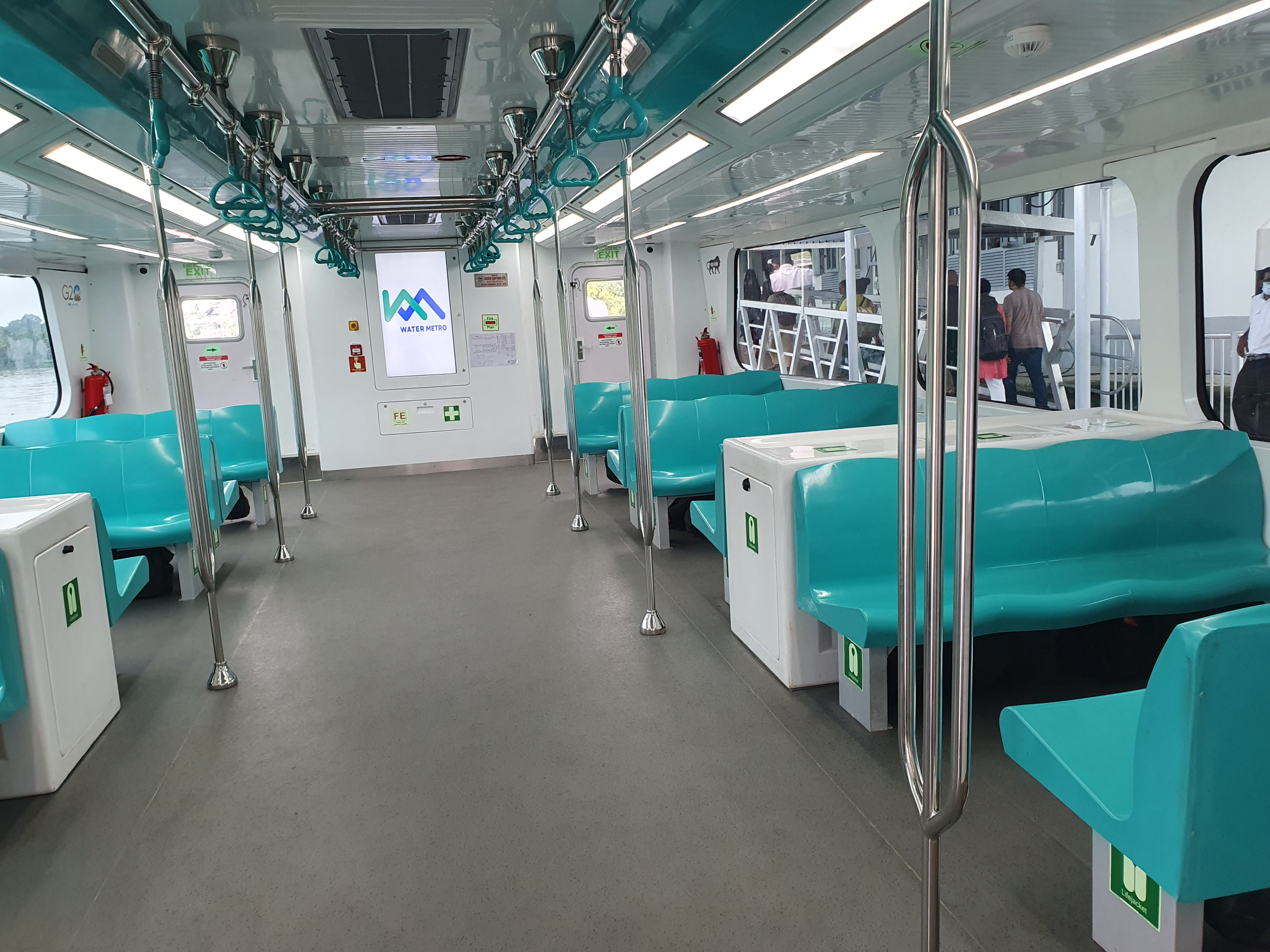
Interior of Kochi Water Metro boat

The main hub for the Kochi Water Metro is the Operation Control Centre. As of April 2025, the OCC was located in the Vyttila Mobility Hub, although there were plans to move it to the High Court terminal. Kochi Water Metro officials have stated that "a majority of services are being operated from" the High Court terminal, and that "a majority of passengers are also from" the area, while just one of the system's routes operates near the Vyttila Mobility Hub. Moving the OCC would free up space in the Vyttila Mobility Hub, enabling the Kochi Water Metro to rent out up about 29,000 square feet (2,700 m^{2}) of space for commercial occupancy.

== Recognition ==
=== International attention ===
The Kochi Water Metro is featured in UN Habitat-World Cities Report Climate Action case studies in its November 2024 edition under the heading "Enhancing Urban Mobility through Low-Carbon Water Transport". Similar reports were featured in Development Asia, the Asian Development Bank's knowledge collaboration platform, and the NDC Partnership, a coalition of more than 130 countries for Climate Action and Sustainable development.

=== Awards and recognitions ===
The electric boats of Kochi Water Metro, which were built by Cochin Shipyard Ltd (CSL), won the Gussies Electric Boat Award for 2022.

== Model replication to other cities ==
=== Urban water transport system ===
The success of the Kochi Water Metro has triggered a feasibility study by the India's Ministry of Ports, Shipping and Waterways to replicate similar projects in other navigable inland waterways in the country. Initially a list of 17 cities were finalized, and later four were added. This includes Prayagraj, Varanasi, Ayodhya, Patna, Ahmedabad, Surat, Jammu & Kashmir, Goa, Kolkata, Dhubri, Mangaluru, Kollam, Alappuzha, Mumbai, Vasai, Tezpur, Dibrugarh, Cuttack and Chilika.

On 17 March 2026, KMRL submitted a feasibility study to the Inland Waterways Authority of India for extension of services to 18 cities across India after conducting studies, extensive field visits, surveys and multiple technical assessments. Services have also been proposed to be extended over to Alappuzha, Kollam and the Lakshadweep Islands.

=== Confirmed projects ===
Karnataka's Chief Minister Siddaramaiah approved the Mangaluru Water Metro project on April 23, 2025, making Karnataka the second state in India to adopt such an extensive water-based transit system. A delegation from the state observed various operational and technical aspects and development timelines to conduct feasibility studies prior to project implementation.

On 13 September 2025, KMRL won a tender to conduct a feasibility study and prepare a detailed project report for replication of water metro services to Mumbai. The project would cover nearly 250 km of waterways connecting localities such as the Mumbai Port, Karanja, Vaitarna, Vasai, Manori, Thane, Kalyan, Navi Mumbai, Bandra, Worli and Panvel on 250 kilometres of waterways, and would include 21 routes, 49 terminals and 207 boats. If launched, the project would be managed jointly by KMRL and the Maharashtra Maritime Board. KMRL estimated the project to cost ₹6,067 crore during its bid submission.

=== Consultancy services ===
KMRL provides services for:

- Conducting feasibility studies and preparing detailed project reports
- Facilitating the land acquisition process in collaboration with the revenue department and local self-government departments
- Conducting geological and topographic surveys, including LiDAR surveys
- Performing hydrographic surveys and assessing navigation feasibility, including channel marking
- Assisting in liaising with various government departments and statutory authorities in India
- Providing design & construction monitoring and supervision for both civil and marine infrastructures
- Designing and developing modern sea-going and inland vessels
- Implementing intelligent transport management systems
- Developing and implementing passenger control systems and automatic fare collection gate systems for efficient operations
- Offering operational support for marine projects and assisting with operational readiness for the operation team
- Assisting with any other marine-related projects
- Supervising the installation of EV charging stations

== See also ==
- Transport in Kochi
- Kochi Metro
- List of water metros in India
- Mumbai Water Metro
- Waterways transport in Kerala
