= Centre for Public Policy Research =

Think tank in Kochi, India

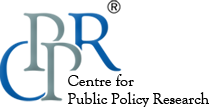
- Abbreviation: CPPR
- Formation: 9 July 2004
- Type: Public Policy Think Tank
- Headquarters: Kochi, Kerala
- Chairman: Dr. D. Dhanuraj
- Website: www.cppr.in

Centre for Public Policy Research (CPPR) is an independent non-profit research organization located in Kochi, India. It was established in the year 2004. It conducts professional research, integrating developments in the areas of education, livelihood, governance, urban reforms and environment. The four focus study centers are: CPPR Centre for Urban Studies, CPPR Centre for Comparative Studies, CPPR Centre for Strategic Studies and CPPR Academy.

== History ==
CPPR was conceived as a policy think tank by a group of young individuals, who believed in Freedom of Expression, Rule of Law and Right to Livelihood. The centre aims to support the creation of an equitable, socially just and environmentally sound society enriched by the principles of democracy and secularism.

In 2009, the Ministry of Science and Technology, India authorised the CPPR team and Civitas Legal Solutions to assist the Government of India (GOI) in preparing the National Data Sharing and Accessibility Policy. The Cabinet of India cleared the draft policy on 15 February 2012.

CPPR also initiated the Digital RTI Mission in 2009, making Kerala the first RTI digital state of India.

== CPPR Focus Study Centres ==
=== CPPR Centre for Urban Studies ===
Susan Zielinski, managing director of SMART, Michigan University, launched the CPPR Centre for Urban Studies in Kochi on 2 September 2013.

The centre aims to understand the emergence of growth centers, market activity and the diverse nature of urbanization in India. It strives to develop market models for building sustainable systems and processes to meet the growing demands of urban spaces. It was in the forefront of initiating 'Bus Day’ in Kochi, a campaign aimed at branding buses as the best way to move about a city. The campaign encouraged people to leave their private vehicles at home and hop on to city buses, to understand the importance of the public transport system in reducing traffic and environmental issues.

=== CPPR Centre for Comparative Studies ===
Dr Chandra Ranade, Adjunct Faculty of Virginia International University, launched the CPPR Centre for Comparative Studies in Kochi on 6 September 2013.

The centre attempts to study the socio-economic and political factors influencing the development of states in India. It analyses the evolution of democratic processes, voting patterns and new actors of conflict in the states of India. The centre also looks into Centre–state relationship, state–state relationship and city–city relationship in the post-globalised world.

=== CPPR Centre for Strategic Studies ===
CPPR Centre for Strategic Studies was launched in Kochi on 16 August 2013 . The event was marked by a lecture on 'Prospects of ASEAN in India's Look East Policy' delivered by Dr. Ernest Bower, Senior Adviser and Sumitro Chair for Southeast Asia Studies, Center for Strategic & International Studies (CSIS), Washington D.C. It was held in association with the Office of Public Affairs, U.S. Consulate General, Chennai.

The centre initiates research in the areas of energy security, maritime security, terrorism, inter-state and inter-country cooperation and extremism. It seeks to develop database and expertise on security in India at the regional level. It also aims to develop a vision plan for Centre-State relationship in national security. This will aid the Indian Government and its security agencies in developing a framework to strengthen security and coordination at the state level.

=== CPPR Academy ===
CPPR Academy aims to promote research and scientific thinking and strives to spread knowledge about public policy research. The academy purports to seek partnerships with like-minded academia and institutions across the world.

Semester at Sea

Around 80 students and staff of Semester at Sea (SAS), a 105-day academic voyage around the world on a floating campus, MV Explorer, anchored in Kochi for the first time in 2010. The participants visited the CPPR office in Kochi to attend a presentation on 'Social Justice, Sustainable Development and Democracy in India'. SAS is a unique course designed for students from various streams and nationalities with sessions inside a ship. The University of Virginia is the academic sponsor of the programme.

SAS has now become a regular affair with Kochi and India on its map, due to the efforts of CPPR. The centre has hosted SAS six times since 2010, with the latest being a thematic session on 'Global Trade from India's Perspective' in March 2016.

Finishing School for Law Students

CPPR conducts a three-day residential certificate course for law graduates called the Finishing School for Law Students (FSL). It is organised by the Alternative Dispute Resolution (ADR) Centre, the dispute resolution wing of CPPR. Launched in 2008.

Summer/Winter School on Public Policy Research Methods

The concept of Winter School was initiated in 2012, when the Atlas Economic Research Foundation or Atlas Network and CPPR came together to launch a pilot venture to impart necessary training in research techniques to public policy researchers across the globe. Surprisingly, it was found that many institutions working in the arena of public policy, advocacy and policy analysis were doing research with less or no understanding of research techniques. The Atlas Network wanted CPPR to train research institutions and individual researchers, who can utilise the skills for their activities in their home countries. The primary aim was to facilitate research that stood out for its originality of thought and approach. Over the years, both Summer Schools and Winter Schools have attracted participants from Europe, Africa, Australia, America and Asia.

Internship

CPPR offers internship opportunities to undergraduate and graduate students. It has hosted more than 100 interns from different educational and cultural backgrounds, who have become its campus ambassadors in India and abroad.

== CPPR Quarterly Lecture Series ==
The CPPR Quarterly Lecture Series is one of the prestigious events organised by CPPR, which has helped cement its position as one of the leading policy think tanks in India. Through the lecture series, CPPR aims to stimulate thought processes and inspire people to act through talks, debates and discussions on social, political, economic, strategic and legal areas.

- Dr Shashi Tharoor inaugurated the CPPR Quarterly Lecture Series, delivering the CPPR 1st Quarterly Lecture with an inspiring talk on 'Freedom of Expression in the Internet Era' on 12 September 2012.
- CPPR 2nd Quarterly Lecture was delivered by Dr Alexander Lennon, Chief Editor of Washington Quarterly, on the topic, 'The Real China Challenge' on 17 January 2013.
- CPPR 3rd Quarterly Lecture was delivered by renowned scientist Professor Madhav Gadgil on the topic, 'Science, Democracy and Ecology' on 15 April 2013.
- CPPR 4th Quarterly Lecture was delivered by former Election Commissioner Mr James Michael Lyngdoh on the topic, 'Decriminalization of Indian Electoral System' on 4 October 2013.
- CPPR 5th Quarterly Lecture was delivered by Dr Happymon Jacob on the topic, 'Indo-Pak Relations: What lies Ahead', on 23 December 2013.
- CPPR 6th Quarterly Lecture was delivered by Dr Sandeep Shastri, prominent political scientist and Pro Vice Chancellor of the Jain University, on the topic, 'Emerging Electoral Landscape: Analysis of Indian Democracy' on 29 March 2014.

== Discussions, Seminars and Workshops ==
- CPPR organised an interaction with Meera Sanyal on 'Governance', former Country Head of RBS on 26 April 2013.
- CPPR organised a three-day residential programme, 'CPPR Introductory Course on Social Science Research Methods' in the period 23–25 May 2013.

== Milestones and achievements ==
Mobility Hub: CPPR created a Mobility Hub concept with the District Administration of Ernakulam. CPPR developed feasibility study for the Confederation of Indian Industry (CII). It is a long-term transport solution for the city of Kochi Based on suggestions from Centre for Public Policy Research (CPPR), Cochin, Kochi Metro Rail Limited decided to shift Vyttila station to Vyttila Mobility Hub to follow the guidelines of ministry of Urban Development to integrate various mode of transport. Long-distance buses operate out of Vyttila hub and the hub authorities are planning to build a new boat jetty there as the part of their second phase of development. Thus, the Kochi metro project became the first metro in the country which connects rail, road and water transport facilities

Livelihood Freedom Campaign: The Law, Liberty and Livelihood Project documented the livelihood regulations and entry level barriers governing the informal sectors in the 63 Indian cities identified for Jawaharlal Nehru National Urban Renewal Mission (JNNURM).

India Development Indicators: It is an online platform that leverages existing investments in data by standardizing, harmonizing, and visualizing development data at various resolutions such as state, district, and parliamentary constituency. CPPR carried out this project in 20 states and 2 UTs covering 378 districts.

Study on Autorickshaw sector in Chennai: CPPR partnered with Civitas Urban Solutions for a study commissioned by Chennai City Connect Foundation. The study aimed at finding the reasons for the distorted pricing of autorickshaw fare system in Chennai. The study was comprehensive with a larger representative samples of the passengers and auto rickshaw drivers of Chennai. Study proposed suggestions for the policy changes in the sector.

NDSAP: CPPR was given the mandate by the Ministry of Science and Technology to assist the Government of India in preparing the National Data Sharing and Accessibility Policy (NDSAP), 2011 – intended to meet the demands of the general public to access government documents through a single window system.

Study on Para-transit System in Chennai: Urban Consultancy wing of CPPR, Civitas Urban Solutions in association with Chennai City Connect and supported by Sakthi Foundation, Delhi, conducted a study on the para-transit system in the city of Chennai. This Study aims at raising the status of Para-transit services, formally integrate them into the existing and future public transport system with nurturing and transparent regulations. The report has been taken up by the City Traffic Commissioner, Chennai City to make improvements in Parking in Chennai City.

Compendium on campus politics in India: Liberal Youth Forum (LYF), in association with the Centre for Public Policy Research (CPPR), conducted a study, wherein it probed how and to what extent Lyngdoh's recommendations were implemented in colleges and universities, and what were the results. The study feature dialogues with educational authorities and campus leaders to understand how campus politics is conducted. The study was able to cover 100 colleges and universities across the country.

Parking Guidelines for Chennai: This study was conducted by the Civitas Urban Solutions in partnership with CPPR. Study undertook four case study areas and suggested guidelines for the parking slots and infrastructure.

== Organisational structure ==
Dr D Dhanuraj is the chairman of the Board of Trustees of CPPR. The advisory board includes former Ambassador T. P. Sreenivasan, Professor Shanta Sinha, and Professor K.N. Panikkar.
