= Vyttila Mobility Hub =

Indian transit terminal in Kochi, Kerala

Vyttila Mobility Hub വൈറ്റില മൊബിലിറ്റി ഹബ്
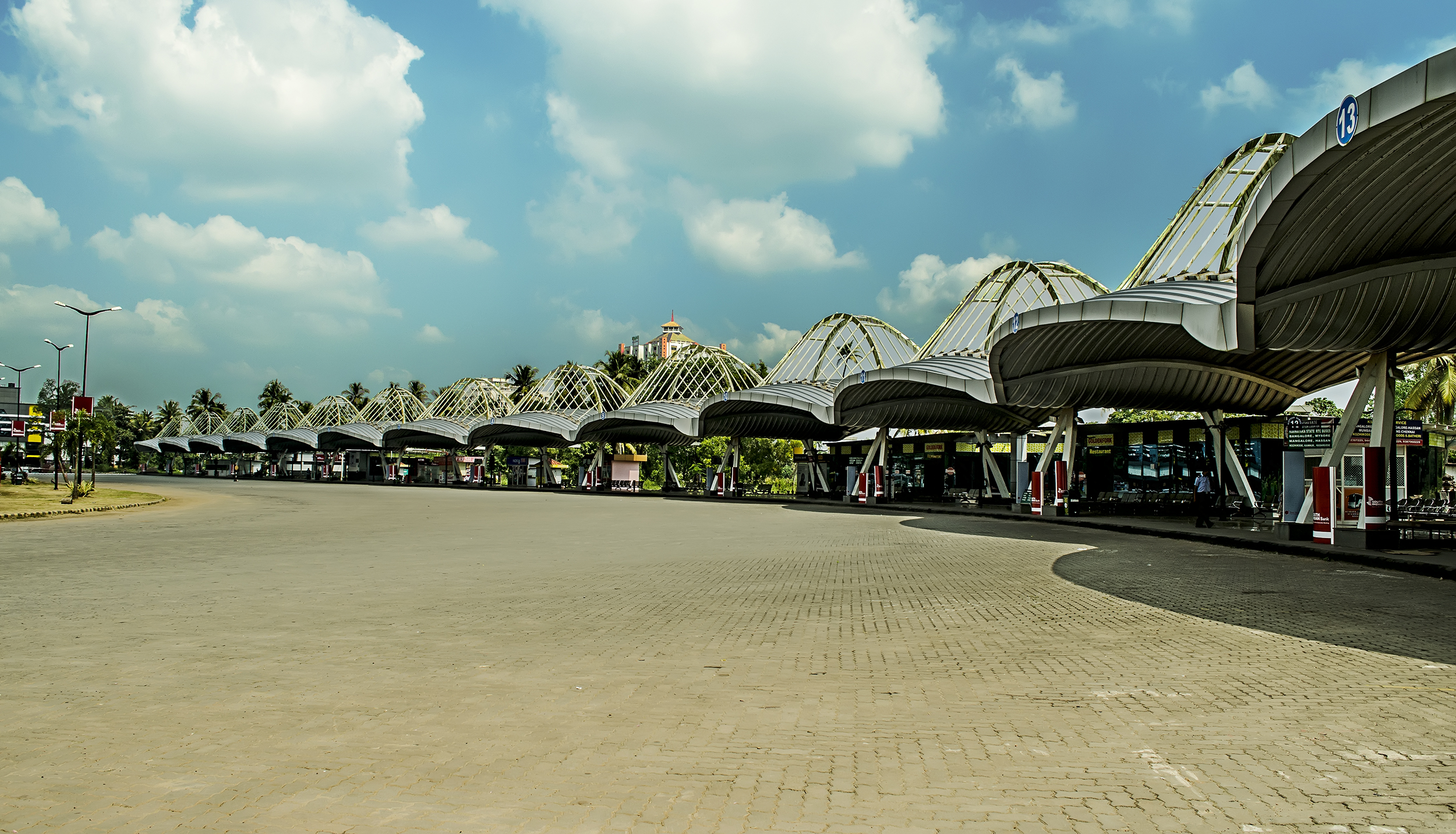

General information
- Location: Vyttila, Kochi, Kerala; India
- Coordinates: 9.969°N 76.321°E
- System: Transit Hub
- Operator: KSRTC, Private Bus operators, Kochi Metro

Construction
- Structure type: At Grade (bus terminal), Elevated (metro rail)

History
- Opened: 26 February 2011; 15 years ago
Location
- Location within Kerala Location within India

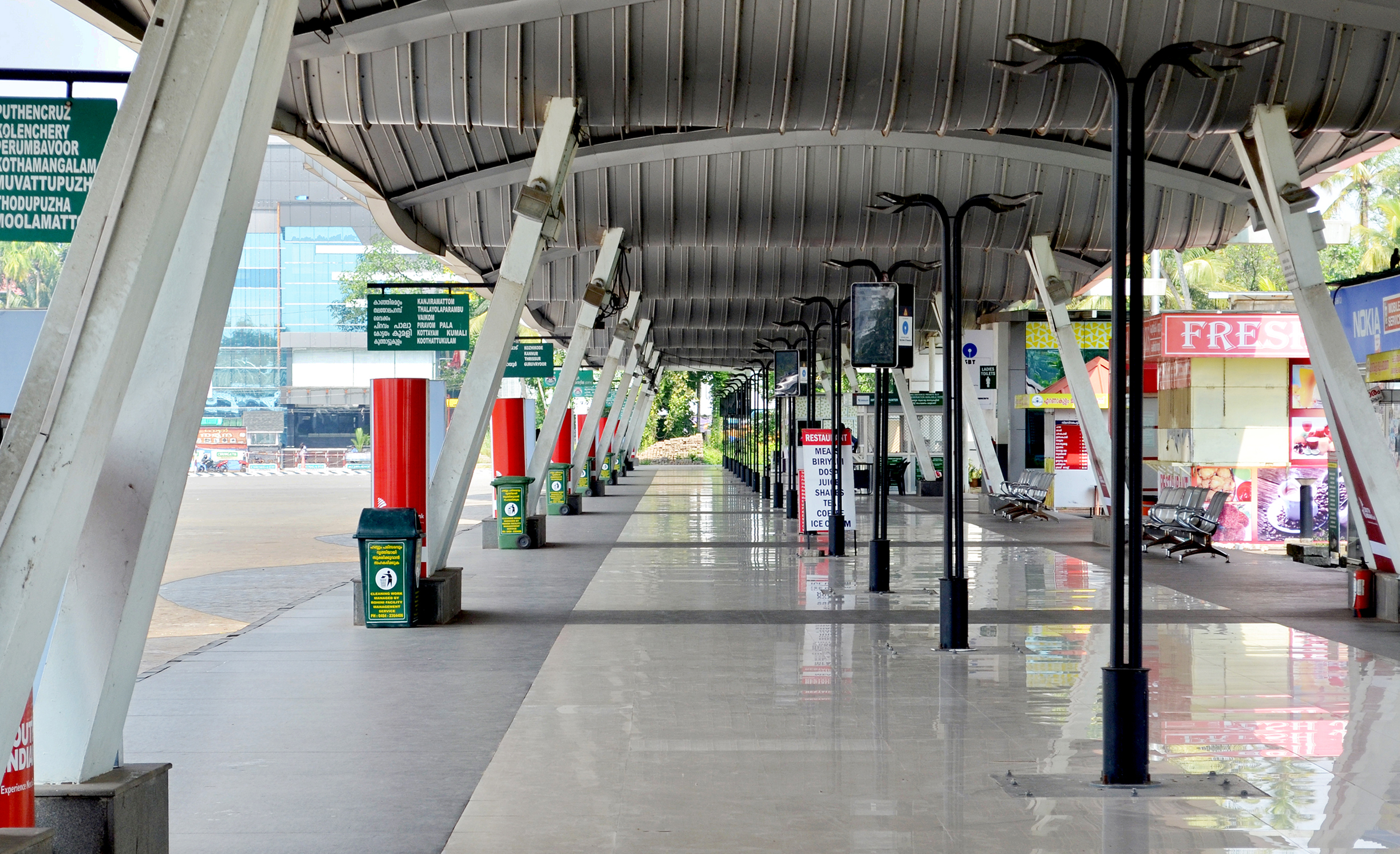
Inside view of Vyttila Mobility Hub

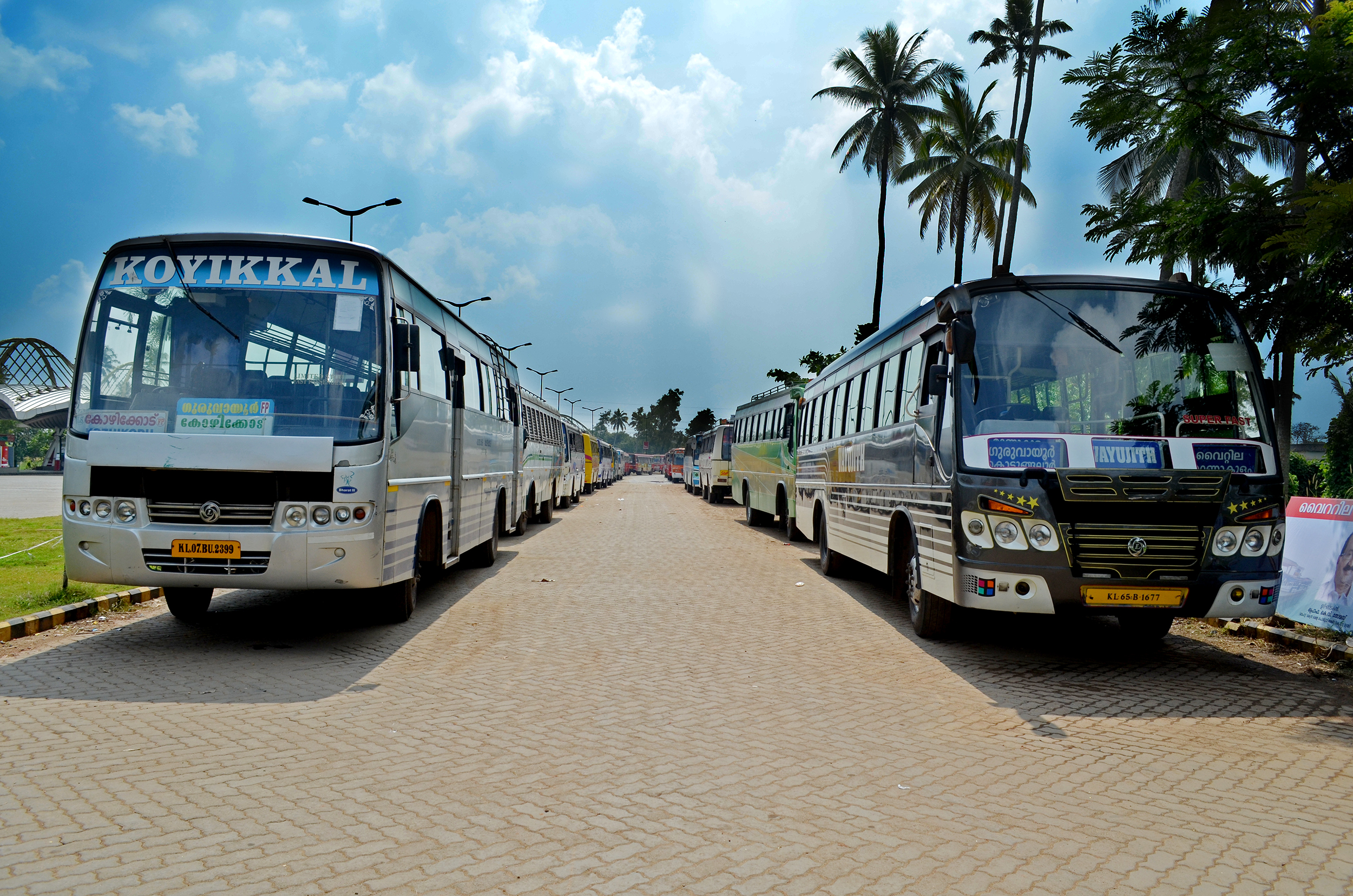
Vyttila Mobility Hub - Bus

Vyttila Mobility Hub is an integrated transit terminal in the city of Kochi. It is designed as a converging point of various forms of public transportation, such as local and long-distance buses, metro rail and inland water transport. It is planned over an area of 37 acres (150,000 m^{2}) in Vyttila, making it one of the largest bus termini in India.

The foundation stone for Mobility Hub in Vytilla was laid by the Chief Minister of Kerala V. S. Achuthanandan on 7 June 2010. Construction of the first phase, consisting of the terminal for long-distance buses and the basic amenities, started in December 2010; the first phase was opened on 26 February 2011. When fully implemented, it will have facilities to integrate all modes of public transportation, as well as for shopping, entertainment and hospitality. As of April 2023, the phase II development work of the hub is going on.

== History ==
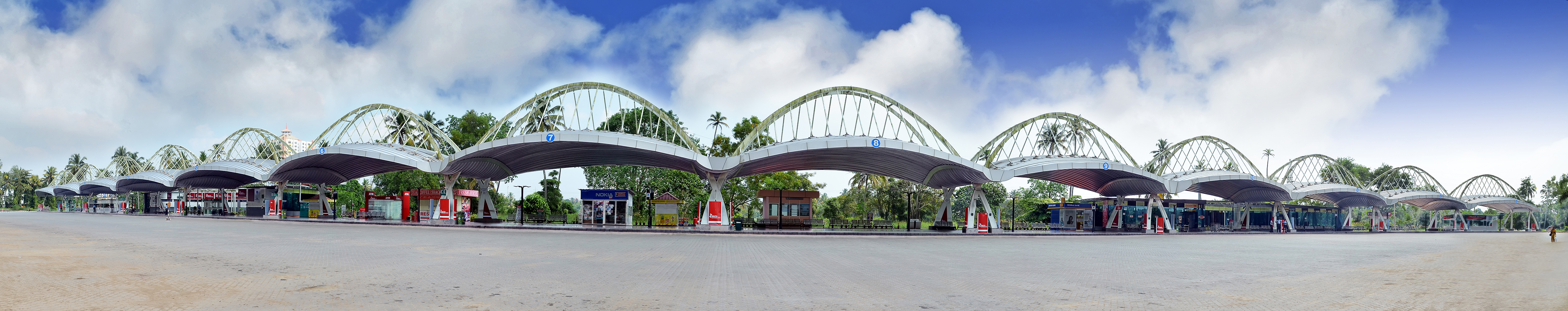
A panoramic view of Vyttila Mobility Hub

A fast-growing city like Kochi requires a comprehensive plan to meet the demands and requirements in Traffic and Transport. Travelling in the city is a Herculean task due to congested roads and traffic jams. The large number of long-distance (mofussil) buses contributes to the present chaos. The number of vehicles in Ernakulam District has increased an average annual growth rate of 13 percent. The Comprehensive Study for Transport System for Greater Kochi Area by Rites Ltd, 2001, NATPAC Traffic Report, 2006, and City Development Plan by Kochi Corporation, 2007, had pointed towards the shifting and integrating of main mofussil bus stands in the city and converting it to a mobility hub at a strategic location near Kochi Bypass. With the support of these studies, the Confederation of Indian Industry(CII)-Kerala and the Centre for Public Policy Research are coming up with a new plan to set up a mobility hub in Vyttila and will transform it into the Gateway of Kerala. The hub project aims to reduce traffic congestion due to the expected increase in traffic flow at Kochi in the coming years with the commissioning of the International Container Transshipment Terminal and other allied projects connected with it.

== Service ==
The site for the mobility hub in Vyttila is well-connected with all routes. It serves as a meeting point for all intercity and intra-city roads. The site is connected to Edappally, Kundannoor, Palarivattom, Vytilla junction through Kochi Bypass and exit road links with Ettumanoor road connecting it with Tripunithura, Pettah, Ambalamugal etc., providing free transition in various directions of the city. It is connected to Kochi Metro and Kochi Water Metro.

== Kochi Metro ==
Vyttila Mobility Hub is connected to Vyttila Metro Station of Kochi Metro Line 1(Aluva to Triupunittura). It is a 160 metres walk to the metro station by Vyttila Mobility Hub Road. Train Towards Thykoodam 1st train-6:41 a.m. Last train-10:39 p.m. Train Towards Aluva 1st train-6:02 a.m. Last train-10:01 p.m.

== Kochi Water Metro ==
Vyttila Mobility Hub is connected to Kochi Water Metro. Vyttila water metro station is on the east side of the mobility hub. It is located by Kaniyampuzha river. It is a 76 metres walk to the ferry terminal by Vyttila Boat Jetty Walkway.

== Future ==
The project is estimated to cost around 121 crore and will be implemented in two phases. The project will have facilities for parking 175 buses, 2,000 to 6,000 cars, and 2,000 to 10,000 two-wheelers. Three boat jetties and green zone would also be set up on the eastern side of the hub. An air-conditioned tube too has been planned, to connect the terminal to the western side of Vytilla junction. Passengers can easily get down at the bus terminal at the hub and use the Mass Transit System like the inter-city bus, auto, ferry, taxi or metro train to enter the city. It has the potential to host a worldclass mega shopping mall, food courts, cultural centre and health club, a hotel and a 50m swimming pool in a total built-up area of 150,000 sq m.

== Construction ==
KITCO, the consultants, is entrusted with total implementation of the project. (The feasibility study of the project too was conducted by KITCO). The tenders for the construction of first phase was granted to Nagarjuna constructions from among seven companies which submitted tenders. The selection was on account of quoting the lowest amount for the execution of the project and the first phase of the project was completed in February 2011.

== See also ==
- Ernakulam KSRTC Bus Station
