= High Court water metro station =

Station of Kochi Water Metro

High Court water metro station ഹൈക്കോടതി വാട്ടർ മെട്രോ സ്റ്റേഷൻ
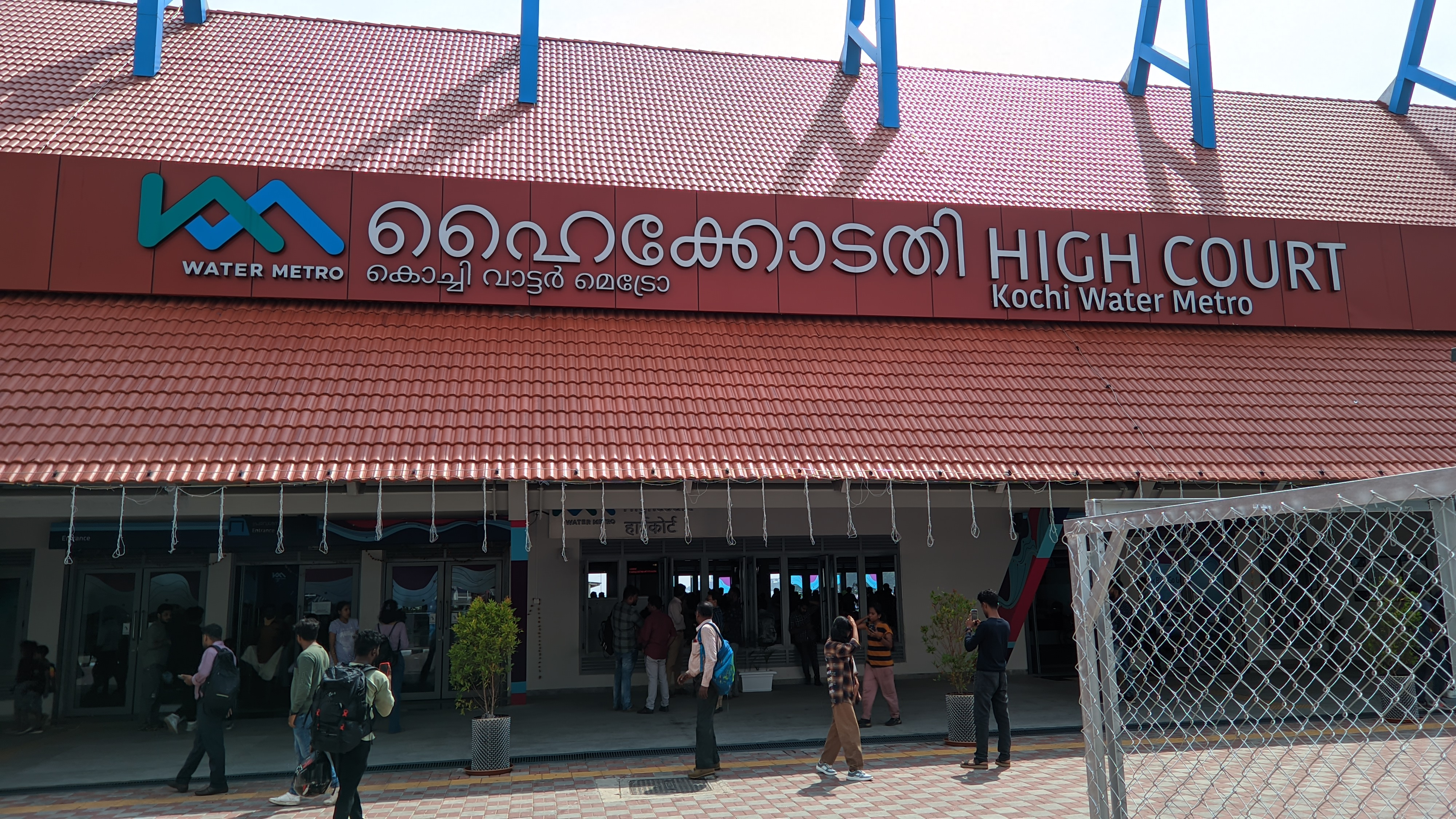
- High Court station entrance

General information
- Location: India
- Owner: Kochi Water Metro Limited
- Operator: Kochi Water Metro
- Manager: Kochi Metro Rail Limited
- Lines: 6 (planned); 1 (operational)

History
- Opened: 26 April 2023

High Court is a station of Kochi Water Metro. The station is located near to the Kerala High Court thus getting its name. It is also located at a distance of 1.3 kilometres (0.81 mi) from the M. G. Road metro station. It was inaugurated by the Prime Minister of India Narendra Modi on 25 April 2023 and opened for public on 26 April as a part of the first phase of the water metro system.
