= Thaikoodam metro station =

Metro station in Kochi, India

Thaikoodam

General information
- Coordinates: 9.959964°N 76.323733°E
- System: Kochi Metro rapid transit

Other information
- Station code: TKD

History
- Opened: 4 September 2019; 6 years ago

Services
Preceding station	Kochi Metro	Following station
Vyttila towards Aluva	Line 1	Pettah towards Thrippunithura Terminal
Route map
Location
- Location within Kochi

Thaikoodam metro station is a metro station of Kochi Metro. It was opened on 4 September 2019 as a part of the extension of the metro system from Maharaja's College to Peta.

== Station layout ==
G	Street level	Exit/Entrance
L1	Mezzanine	Fare control, station agent, Metro Card vending machines, crossover
L2	Side platform | Doors will open on the left
L2	Platform 2 Southbound	Towards → Thrippunithura Terminal next station is Pettah
L2	Platform 1 Northbound	Towards ← Aluva next station is Vyttila
L2	Side platform | Doors will open on the left
L2
