= Thrippunithura Terminal metro station =

Metro station in Kochi, India

Thrippunithura Terminal

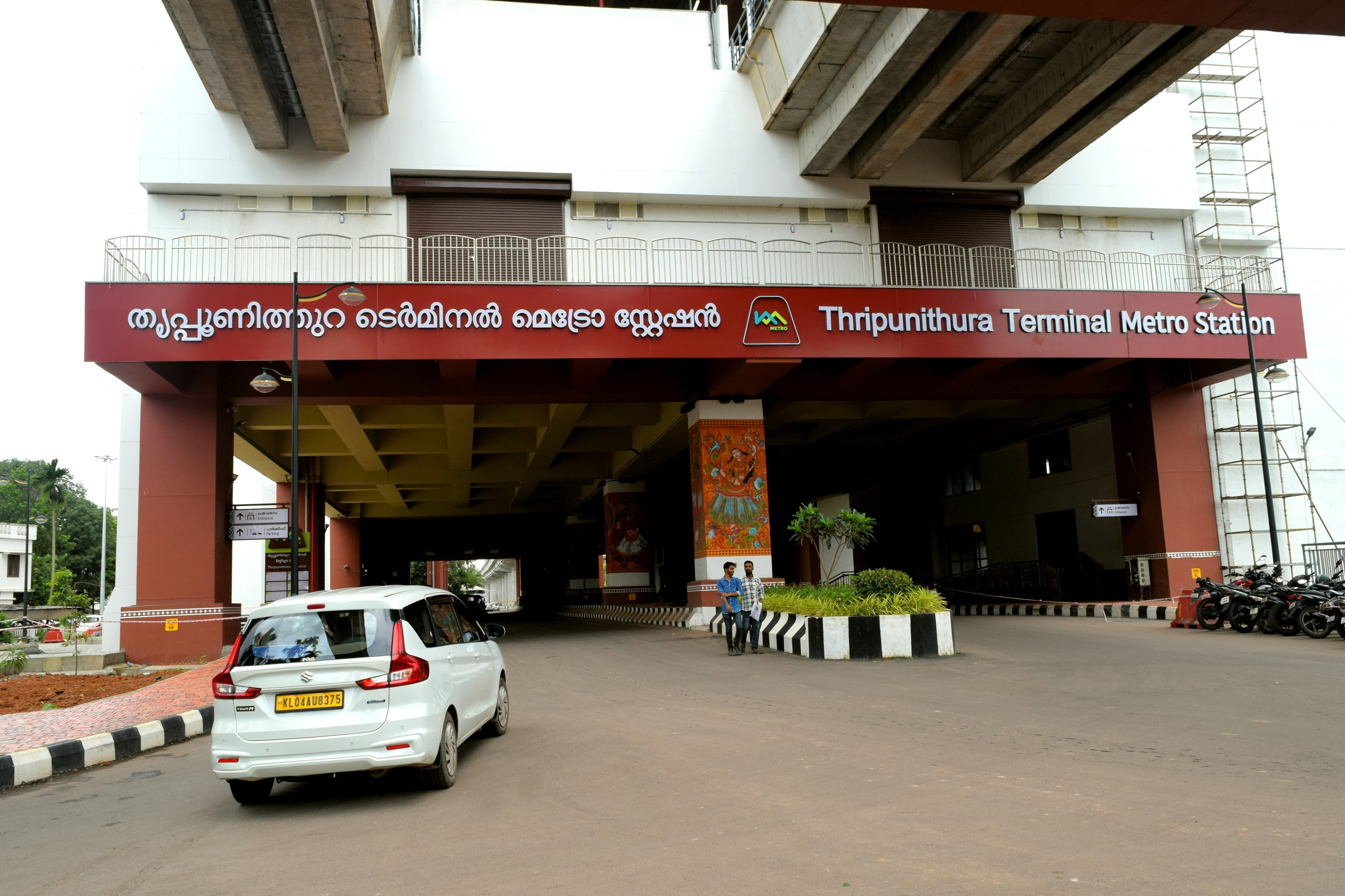
- Thrippunithura Terminal metro station Entrance

General information
- Location: Thrippunithura, Kochi
- Coordinates: 9.9503°N 76.3516°E
- System: Kochi Metro
- Owner: KMRL
- Connections: Tripunithura

History
- Opened: 6 March 2024; 2 years ago
- Electrified: 750V DC

Services
Preceding station	Kochi Metro	Following station
SN Junction towards Aluva	Line 1	Terminus
Route map
Location
- Location within Kerala

Thrippunithura Terminal is a terminal metro station serving as the southern terminal of the Kochi Metro which was opened on 6 March 2024. It was inaugurated by the Prime Minister of India Narendra Modi on 6 March 2024 and marked the completion of final station of the first phase of the Kochi metro system that starts from Aluva.

== Location and connections ==
Thrippunithura Terminal metro station is located on the side of the Tripunithura railway station.It is the final station in the 'Phase 1' of the Kochi Metro. It offers connectivity to the bustling Thrippunithura, a business oriented town, and the several suburbs such as Chottanikkra, Kandanad, Thiruvankulam and Eroor.
