= Kochi Water Metro Limited =

Public-sector company that operates Kochi Water Metro

Kochi Water Metro Corporation Limited (KWML)
- Native name: കൊച്ചി വാട്ടർ മെട്രോ ലിമിറ്റഡ്
- Industry: Public transport
- Founded: 14 July 2021; 5 years ago
- Headquarters: Kochi, Kerala, India
- Key people: G. Priyanka (MD, KMRL & District Collector, Ernakulam)
- Services: Kochi Water Metro
- Owner: Government of Kerala (74%); Kochi Metro Rail Limited (26%)
- Website: www.watermetro.co.in

Kochi Water Metro Limited, abbreviated to KWML, is an Indian public sector company based in Kochi, Kerala. The company was established on 14 July 2021 as a special purpose vehicle to operate and maintain Kochi Water Metro.

== History ==
In June 2021, the Kerala government and Kochi Metro Rail Limited (KMRL) entered into an agreement to set up a special purpose vehicle (spv) to implement Kochi Water Metro. Under the agreement, the Kerala government would own 74% of the spv known as Kochi Water Metro Limited (KWML), while KMRL would own the remaining 26% of it. KWML would be in charge of operating, maintaining, and managing the Kochi Water Metro. KMRL was also given the initial technical and administrative tasks while the company was being set up. Under the agreement, KMRL managing director would lead the company, and there would be eight directors on the board. The government would nominate five directors, while remaining three would be appointed by KMRL.

== See also ==
- Kochi Water Metro
- Kochi Metro Rail Limited
