= Kochi Metro Rail Limited =

Public-sector company that operates Kochi metro

Kochi Metro Rail Corporation Limited (KMRL)
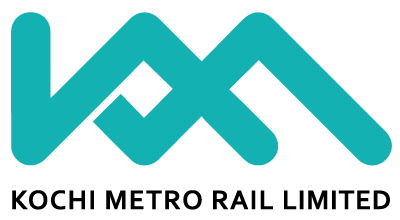
- Native name: കൊച്ചി മെട്രോ റെയിൽ ലിമിറ്റഡ്
- Industry: Public transport
- Founded: 2 August 2011; 15 years ago
- Headquarters: Kochi, Kerala, India
- Key people: G. Priyanka IAS (Managing Director, KMRL)
- Services: Kochi Metro; Kochi Water Metro (through Kochi Water Metro Limited)
- Revenue: ▲₹224.65 crore (US$23 million) (FY 2025–2026)
- Operating income: ▲₹52.64 crore (US$5.5 million) (FY 2025–2026)
- Net income: ▼₹352.49 crore (US$37 million) (FY 2025–2026)
- Owner: Government of India (50%); Government of Kerala (50%)
- Website: www.kochimetro.org

Kochi Metro Rail Limited, abbreviated to KMRL, is an Indian centre-state public sector company based in Kochi, Kerala that operates the Kochi Metro. The company was incorporated on 2 August 2011. KMRL also owns 26% share in the Kochi Water Metro Limited which operates and maintains the Kochi Water Metro.

== History ==
Kochi Metro Rail Limited (KMRL) is a joint venture company with equal equity contribution of Government of India and Government of Kerala. KMRL is responsible for the implementation, operation and maintenance of Kochi Metro Rail Project and Kochi Water Metro Project as per orders from the Planning Commission and the Union Government.

== Projects ==
=== Kochi Metro ===
Initially the project was Phase -I, Aluva to Petta and Phase -II JLN Stadium to Info Park. In Phase-I, KMRL proposed to have 22 stations covering a distance of 25 km from Aluva to Petta. KMRL completed Phase 1 extension with 3 additional stations. KMRL now has 25 operational stations covering a distance of 28.8 km from Aluva to Thripunithura Terminal. The Phase -III from Aluva to Angamaly is pending for approval.

=== Kochi Water Metro ===
Kochi Water Metro is the first ever water metro project in India. It is a 76 Km long integrated transport system connecting 10 islands with mainland Ernakulam city through a network of 16 routes comprising 38 stations.

=== Metro Connect ===
KMRL operates feeder buses under the name "Metro Connect", connecting metro stations with Cochin International airport and nearby commercial hubs. A fleet of 15 electric, air-conditioned Eicher buses is used for this service.

== See also ==
- Transport in Kochi
- Kochi Water Metro
- Kochi Metro
