= List of Kochi Metro stations =

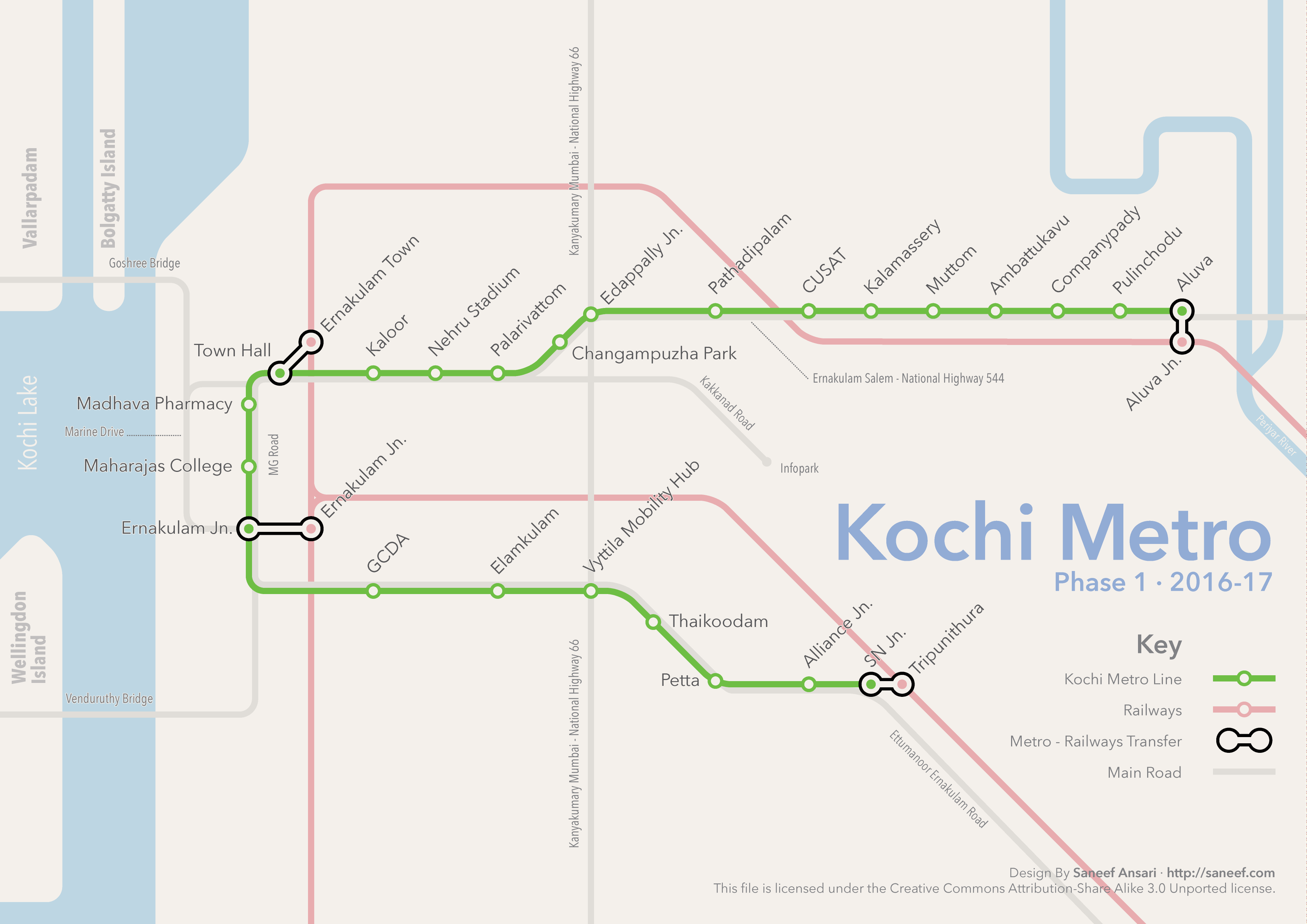
Kochi Metro - Phase 1 route map

This is a list of stations of the Kochi Metro. There are 25 stations on the line from Aluva to Tripunithura railway station.

== Stations ==
†	Terminal station
††	Transfer station to Indian Railways
#*	Terminal and transfer station to Indian Railways

=== Operational ===
Station name		Line	Opened	Height of rail Level	Chainage (km)	Distance from previous station (km)	Platform type	Alignment description	Location (in coordinates)	Notes	Refs
English	Malayalam	Line	Opened	Height of rail Level	Chainage (km)	Distance from previous station (km)	Platform type	Alignment description	Location (in coordinates)	Notes	Refs
Aluva†	ആലുവ	Blue Line	19 June 2017	12.5 m	0.098	0	Side	Curved (at 1000m)	10.1098°N 76.3496°E	–	
Pulinchodu	പുളിഞ്ചോട്	Blue Line	19 June 2017	12.5 m	1.827	1.729	Side	Curved	10.095120°N 76.346661°E	–	
Companypady	കമ്പനി പടി	Blue Line	19 June 2017	12.5 m	2.796	0.969	Side	Straight	10.087293°N 76.342840°E	–	
Ambattukavu	അമ്പാട്ടുകാവ്	Blue Line	19 June 2017	12.5 m	3.779	0.984	Side	Straight	10.079372°N 76.339004°E	–	
Muttom	മുട്ടം	Blue Line	19 June 2017	12.5 m	4.716	0.937	Side & island	Straight curved	10.0727°N 76.3337°E	–	
Kalamassery††	കളമശ്ശേരി	Blue Line	19 June 2017	12.5 m	6.768	2.052	Side	Straight	10.058400°N 76.321926°E	Transfer to Kalamassery railway station	
Cochin University	കൊച്ചിൻ സർവ്വകലാശാല	Blue Line	19 June 2017	12.5 m	8.147	1.379	Side	Curved	10.046879°N 76.318377°E	–	
Pathadipalam	പത്തടിപ്പാലം	Blue Line	19 June 2017	12.5 m	9.394	1.247	Side	Straight	10.035948°N 76.314371°E	–	
Edapally	ഇടപ്പള്ളി	Blue Line	19 June 2017	12.5 m	10.787	1.393	Side	Straight	10°1′35.96″N 76°18′33.33″E	–	
Changampuzha Park	ചങ്ങമ്പുഴ പാർക്ക്	Blue Line	19 June 2017	12.5 m	12.088	1.300	Side	Straight	10°0′54.64″N 76°18′8.26″E	–	
Palarivattom	പാലാരിവട്ടം	Blue Line	19 June 2017	12.5 m	13.096	1.008	Side	Straight	10°0′32.27″N 76°18′13.86″E	–	
J. L. N. Stadium	ജെ. എൽ. എൻ. സ്റ്റേഡിയം	Blue Line	3 October 2017	12.5 m	14.217	1.121	Side	Straight	10°0′1.86″N 76°17′56.41″E	–	
Kaloor	കലൂർ	Blue Line	3 October 2017	12.5 m	15.250	1.033	Side	Straight	9°59′40.62″N 76°17′29.77″E	–	
Town Hall††	ടൗണ്‍ ഹാൾ	Blue Line	3 October 2017	12.5 m	15.723	0.473	Side	Straight	9°59′28.4″N 76°17′16.9″E	Transfer to Ernakulam Town railway station	
M. G. Road	എം. ജി. റോഡ്	Blue Line	3 October 2017	12.5 m	16.926	1.203	Side	Straight	9°59′2.64″N 76°16′55.38″E	–	
Maharaja's College	മഹാരാജാസ് കോളേജ്	Blue Line	3 October 2017	12.5 m	18.100	1.173	Side	Straight	9°58′24.34″N 76°17′05.96″E	–	
Ernakulam South††	എറണാകുളം തെക്ക്	Blue Line	3 September 2019	12.5 m	18.956	0.856	Side	Straight	9°58′3.92″N 76°17′28.60″E	Transfer to Ernakulam Junction railway station	
Kadavanthra	കടവന്ത്ര	Blue Line	3 September 2019	12.5 m	20.141	1.185	Side	Straight	9°57′59.72″N 76°17′53.73″E	–	
Elamkulam	ഇളങ്കുളം	Blue Line	3 September 2019	12.5 m	21.295	1.155	Side	Straight	9.967075°N 76.308364°E	–	
Vyttila	വൈറ്റില	Blue Line	3 September 2019	12.5 m	22.734	1.439	Side	Straight	9.967477°N 76.320426°E	–	
Thaikoodam	തൈക്കൂടം	Blue Line	3 September 2019	12.5 m	23.758	1.024	Side	Straight	9.960080°N 76.323708°E	–	
Pettah†	പേട്ട	Blue Line	7 September 2020	12.5 m	24.941	1.183	Side	Straight	9.951161°N 76.331004°E	–	
Vadakkekotta	വടക്കേക്കോട്ട	Blue Line	1 September 2022	12.5 m			Side	Straight			
SN Junction	എസ്എൻ ജംഗ്ഷൻ	Blue Line	1 September 2022	12.5 m			Side	Straight			
Thrippunithura Terminal††	തൃപ്പൂണിത്തുറ ടെർമിനൽ	Blue Line	6 March 2024								
