= Blue Line (Kochi Metro) =

Line of Kochi's metro

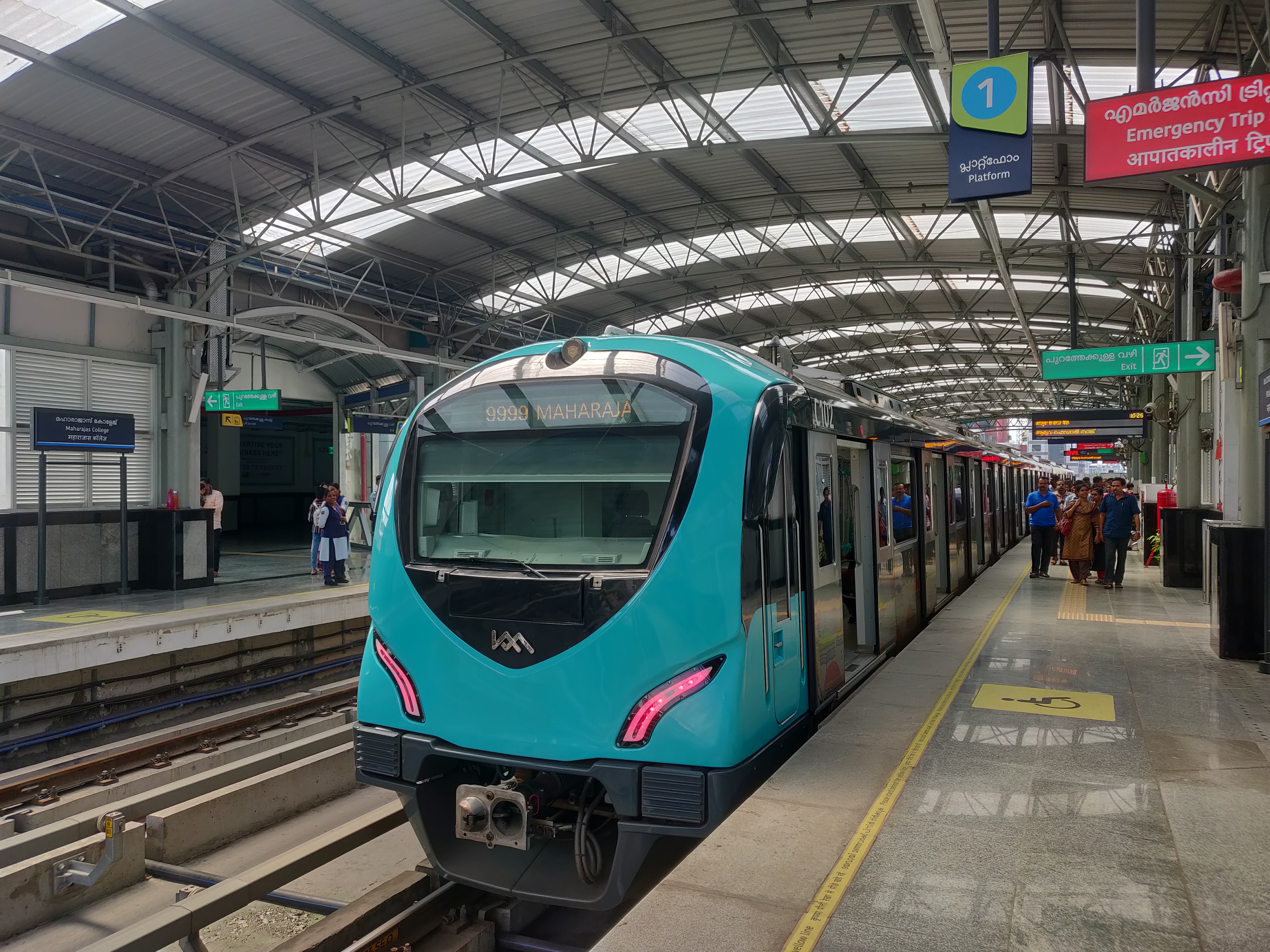
- Train arriving at Maharaja's College station

Overview
- Owner: Kochi Metro Rail Limited
- Locale: Kochi, Kerala, India
- Termini: Aluva; Thrippunithura Terminal
- Stations: 25

Service
- Type: Rapid transit
- System: Kochi Metro
- Operator: Kochi Metro Rail Limited
- Rolling stock: Alstom Metropolis

History
- Opened: 17 June 2017; 9 years ago

Technical
- Line length: 28.12 km (17.47 mi)
- Character: Elevated
- Track gauge: 1,435 mm (4 ft 8 1/2 in) standard gauge
- Electrification: 750 V DC third rail
- Operating speed: 80 km/h (50 mph)

The Blue Line is a part of the Kochi Metro system serving the city of Kochi, India. The line is 28.12 km (17.47 mi) long and spans 25 stations from Aluva to Thrippunithura Terminal. It was inaugurated on 17 June 2017 by Prime Minister Narendra Modi and Chief Minister Pinarayi Vijayan. It is owned and operated by Kochi Metro Rail Limited, a 50:50 joint venture between Government of India and Government of Kerala. It connects important areas in the city like JLN Stadium, Ernakulam railway station, Vyttila, etc.

== Stations ==
There are 25 operational stations on the Blue Line, all of them are elevated.

=== Interchanges ===
Passenger interchange facilities, connecting to other railway lines, will be provided at the following stations:

- Town Hall (Connects to Ernakulam Town railway station)
- Ernakulam South (Connects to Ernakulam Junction railway station)
- Vyttila (Connects to the Water Metro at Vyttila)
- Tripunithura Terminal (Connects to Tripunithura railway station)

Blue Line
#	Stations name		Opening	Connections	Platform type	Alignment description
#	English	Malayalam	Opening	Connections	Platform type	Alignment description
1	Aluva	ആലുവ	19 June 2017	None	Side	On 1000 metres curve
2	Pulinchodu	പുളിഞ്ചോട്	19 June 2017	None	Side	Curved
3	Companypady	കമ്പനിപ്പടി	19 June 2017	None	Side	Straight
4	Ambattukavu	അമ്പാട്ടുകാവ്	19 June 2017	None	Side	Straight
5	Muttom	മുട്ടം	19 June 2017	None	Side & Island	Straight Curved
6	Kalamassery	കളമശ്ശേരി	19 June 2017	None	Side	Straight
7	Cochin University	കൊച്ചിൻ യൂണിവേഴ്‌സിറ്റി	19 June 2017	None	Side	Straight
8	Pathadipalam	പത്തടിപ്പാലം	19 June 2017	None	Side	Straight
9	Edapally	ഇടപ്പള്ളി	19 June 2017	None	Side	Straight
10	Changampuzha Park	ചങ്ങമ്പുഴ പാർക്ക്	19 June 2017	None	Side	Straight
11	Palarivatom	പാലാരിവട്ടം	19 June 2017	None	Side	Straight
12	J. L. N. Stadium	ജെ. എൽ. എൻ സ്റ്റേഡിയം	3 October 2017	Pink Line (Under Construction)	Side	Straight
13	Kaloor	കലൂർ	3 October 2017	None	Side	Straight
14	Town Hall	ടൗണ്‍ ഹാൾ	3 October 2017	Ernakulam Town	Side	Curved
15	M. G. Road	എം. ജി റോഡ്‌	3 October 2017	None	Side	Straight
16	Maharaja's College	മഹാരാജാസ് കോളേജ്	3 October 2017	None	Side	Straight
17	Ernakulam South	എറണാകുളം സൗത്ത്	3 September 2019	Ernakulam Junction	Side	Straight
18	Kadavanthra	കടവന്ത്ര	3 September 2019	None	Side	Straight
19	Elamkulam	എളംകുളം	3 September 2019	None	Side	Straight
20	Vyttila	വൈറ്റില	3 September 2019	Vyttila	Side	Straight
21	Thaikoodam	തൈക്കൂടം	3 September 2019	None	Side	Straight
22	Pettah	പേട്ട	7 September 2020	None	Side	Straight
23	Vadakkekotta	വടക്കേക്കോട്ട	1 September 2022	None	Side	Straight
24	SN Junction	എസ്.എൻ ജംഗ്ഷൻ	1 September 2022	None	Side	Straight
25	Tripunithura Terminal	തൃപ്പൂണിത്തുറ ടെർമിനൽ	6 March 2024	Tripunithura	Side	Straight

== Proposed Stations ==
Blue Line

#	Stations name		Connections
#	English	Malayalam	Connections
1	Thottakkattukara	തോട്ടയ്ക്കാട്ടുകര	
2	Kunnampuram	കുന്നംപുറം	
3	Parambayam	പറമ്പയം	
4	Nedumbassery	നെടുമ്പാശ്ശേരി	
5	Athani	അത്താനി	
6	Kariyad	കരിയാട്	
7	Airport Railway Station	വിമാനത്താവള റെയിൽവേ സ്റ്റേഷൻ	Cochin International Airport
8	Kochi Airport	കൊച്ചി വിമാനത്താവളം	CIAL
9	Nayathode	നയത്തോടെ	
10	Kavarapparambu	കാവരപ്പറമ്പ്	
11	Arikkal Junction	അരിക്കൽ ജംഗ്ഷൻ	
12	Little Flower Hospital	ലിറ്റിൽ ഫ്ലവർ ഹോസ്പിറ്റൽ	
13	Angamaly Town	അങ്കമാലി ടൗൺ	Angamaly for Kalady
14	Kothakulangara	കോതകുളങ്ങര	
15	Karayamparambu	കാരയംപറമ്പ്	

== See also ==
- Transport in Kochi
- Pink Line (Kochi Metro)
- Kochi Water Metro
- Rapid transit in India
