= Morkulangara Devi Temple =

- മോർക്കുളങ്ങര ദേവിക്ഷേത്രം
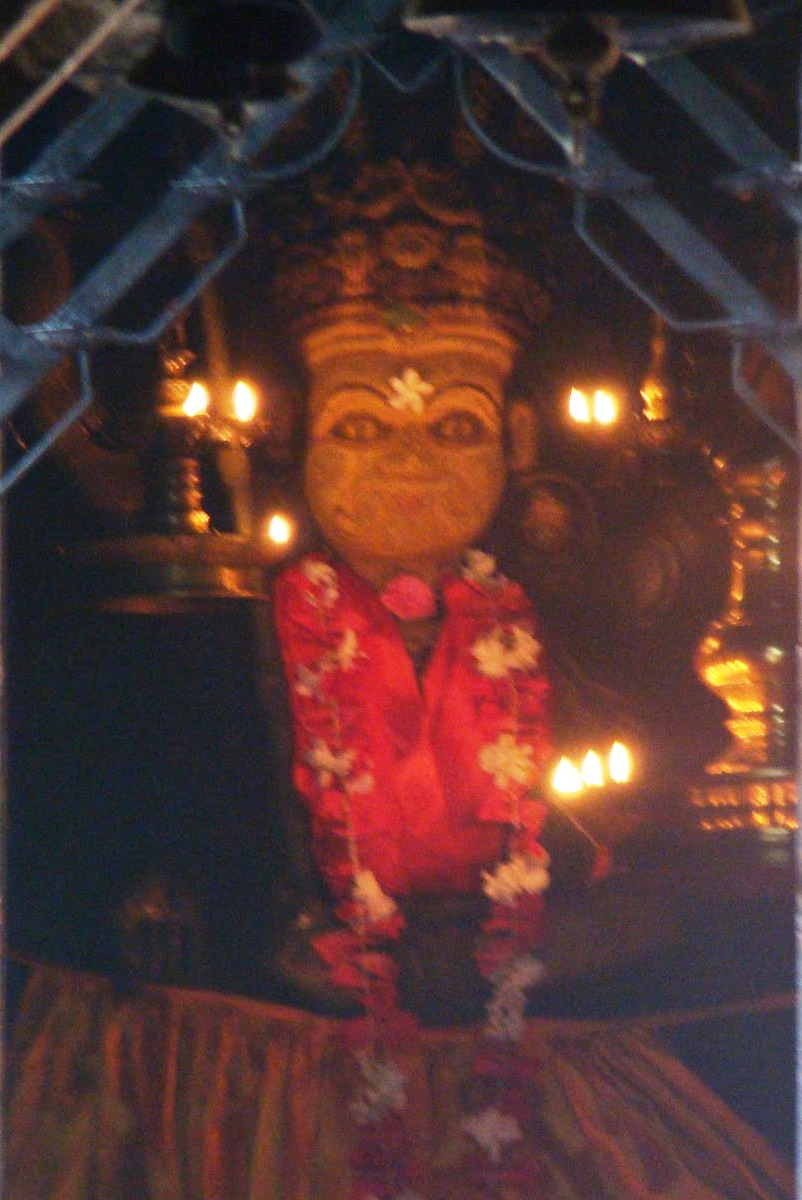
- Morkulangara Devi

- Temple Location

Religion
- Affiliation: Hinduism
- Deity: Durga

Location
- Location: Vazhappally, Changanacherry, Kottayam, Kerala
- Interactive map of Morkulangara Devi Temple
- Coordinates: 9°30′5″N 76°35′5″E

Architecture
- Type: Kerala
- Creator: Thekkumkur King
- Completed: Thekkumkur Kingdom

Morkulangara Devi Temple is a famous Hindu temple in the Kottayam District of Kerala state in India. The presiding deity is Bhagavathy. The prime feature of this temple is the deity having a height of more than 6 feet. It is believed that the Devi in Morkulangara temple placed in this place after killing the demon Darika.

== Overview ==
The temple is very famous among devotees. The tall palm tree just in front of the temple sanctum sanctorum facing the Devi Idol is very attractive. Meena Bharani festival in March–April is the main festival here. It is celebrated on the Bharani star in the month of Meenam (15 March – 14 April). Devotees throngs to the temple for the three-day festival.

The temple pond is famous and it is in this place the Lord Shiva Idol from Major Vazhappally Shiva Temple dips from Aarattu during the 10-day festival of Shiva temple. The Procession from the Shiva temple reaches Morkulangara temple and Aarattu ceremony is performed with great devotion.

== Administration ==
The temple is administered by Travancore Devaswom Board.

== Important days ==
The important days in which devotees flock to the Morkulangara Devi Temple are Tuesday and Friday.

== Geographical location ==
The Morkulangara Devi Temple is located in Changanassery taluk in Kottayam District. It is just 15 km away from District headquarters and just 2 km away from Changanaseery Municipal junction.

== How to reach ==
The nearest Airport is Nedumbassery International Airport near Eranakulam. It is at a distance of about 100 km from the temple.

The nearest railhead is Changanassery and temple is just 1 km away from the station.

The nearest bus stop for KSRTC buses is Mathumoola in Changanassery, which is just 750m away from the temple. Cars and Auto rickshaws are frequently available from Changanassery and Kottayam.

Darshan Time: Morning 5 am to 10 pm and Evening 5 pm to 8 pm.

== See also ==
- Temples of Kerala
- Vazhappally Maha Siva Temple
