= Kerala Museum =

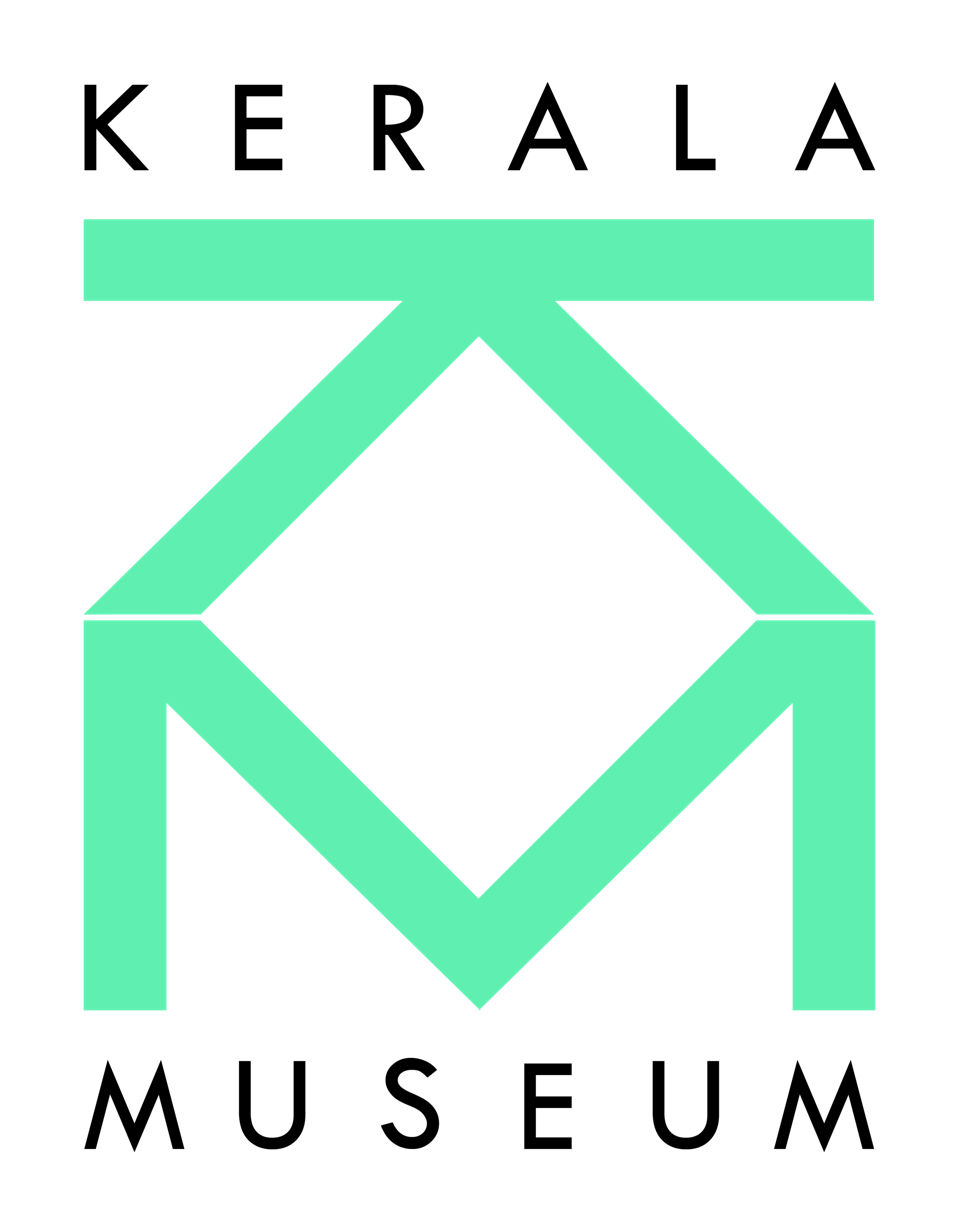

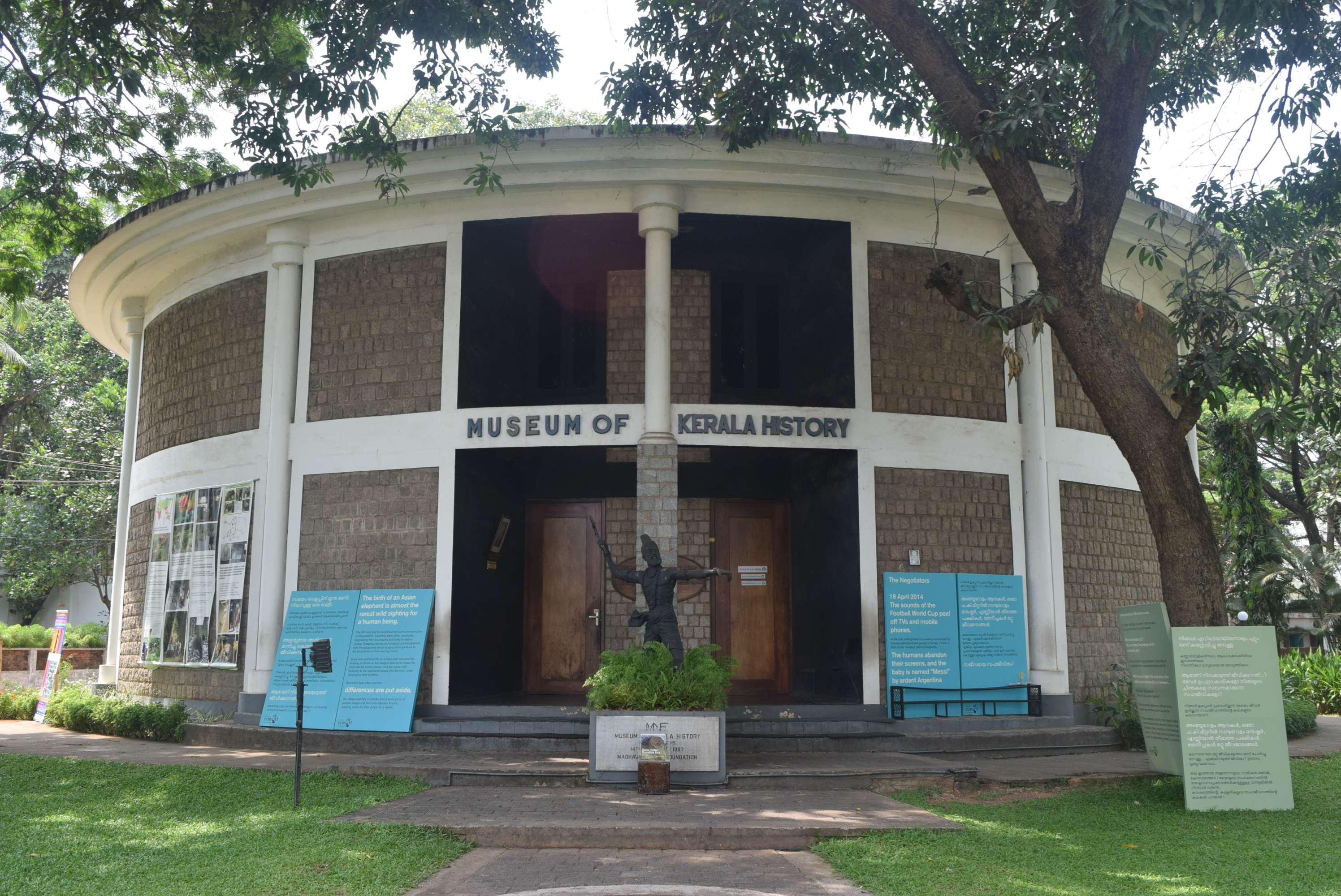
- Former name: Museum of Kerala History
- Established: 1984
- Location: Kochi, Kerala, India
- Coordinates: 10°02′17″N 76°18′52″E
- Type: Art museum, History museum
- Public transit access: Pathadipalam metro station
- Website: https://keralamuseum.org/

Kerala Museum (also known as the Museum of Kerala History) at Edapally, Kochi, India, is one of the oldest art and history museums in Kochi. It is managed by the Madhavan Nayar Foundation, a registered Public Charitable Trust, established in 1984, founded by philanthropist and entrepreneur R. Madhavan Nayar (1914–1996). The museum was opened to visitors in 1987.

Kerala Museum has three galleries: the Museum of Kerala History, the Dolls Museum and the Gallery of Modern Art.

== Museum of Kerala History ==
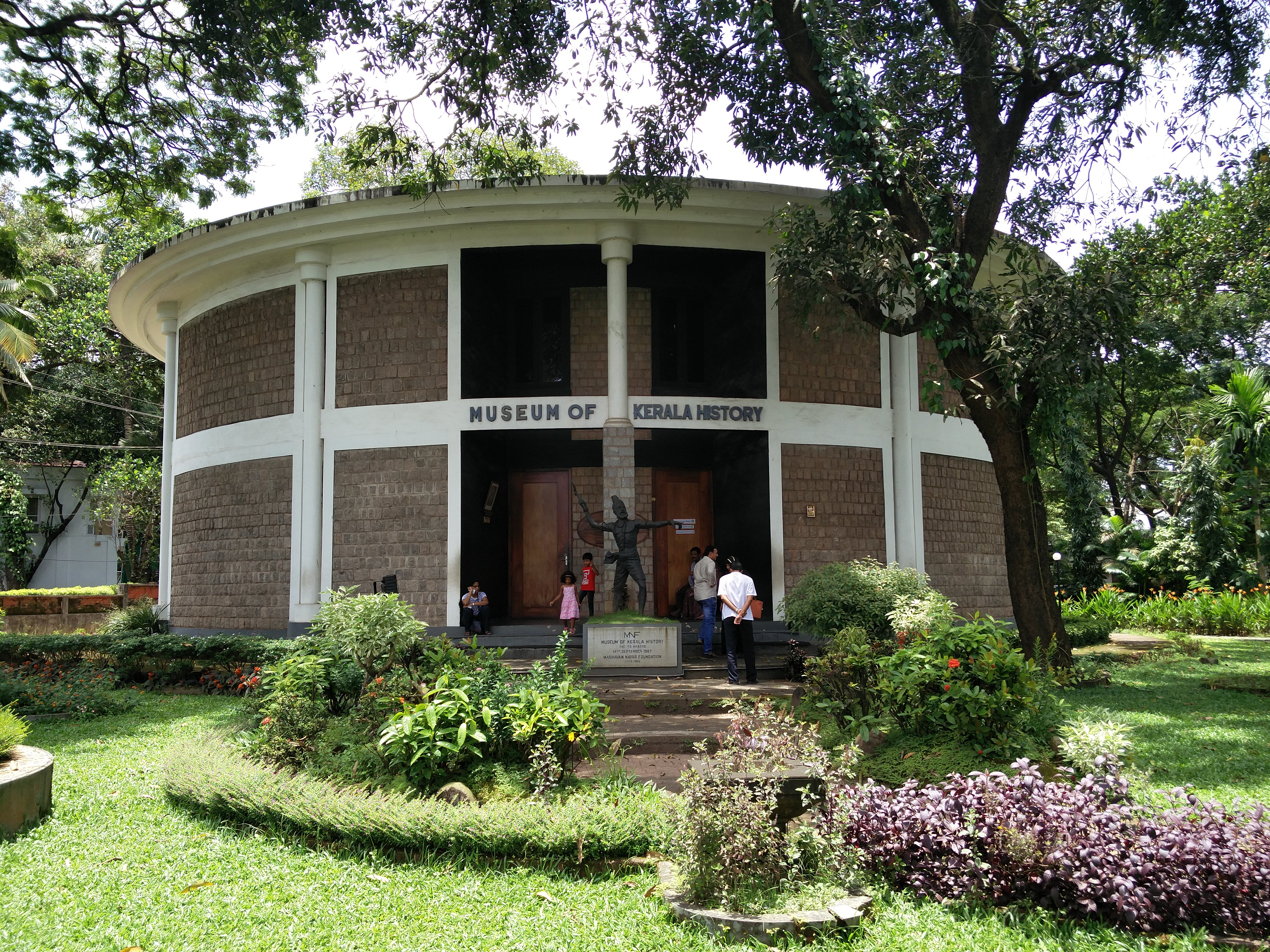
Museum of Kerala History

The Museum of Kerala History is the oldest gallery in the Kerala Museum. The museum depicts the stories of the lives of 87 personalities, who played a significant role in shaping Kerala's future. A light and sound show is organised for all visitors to the gallery, with commentaries in English and Malayalam. Important historical personalities in focus in the gallery include including Ay Andiran of Pothiyilmala, Senguttavan and Ilango Venmani, St. Thomas, the Aryan immigration, Nannan of Ezhimala, Kulasekhara Alvar, Cheraman Perumal Nayanar and Shankaracharya. Sculptor Karamana Rajagopal of Thiruvananthapuram created the sculptures and dioramas in this gallery, and pre-eminent Kerala historian A. Sreedhara Menon extended advice on content.

Outside the gallery is a statue of Parasurama, the sage who is believed to have brought forth the land of Kerala from the ocean.

== Modern Art Gallery ==
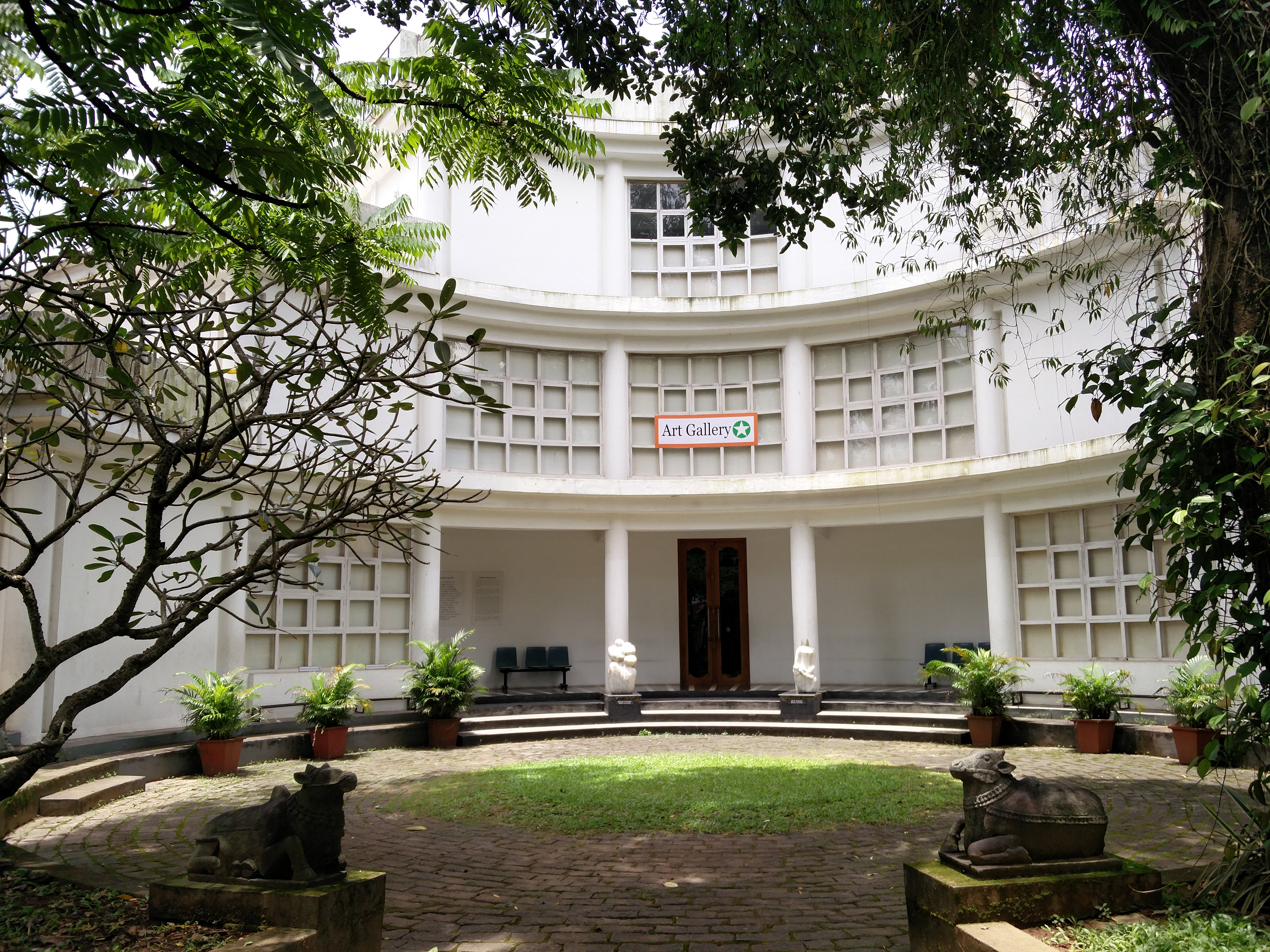
Modern Art Gallery

The Modern Art Gallery, which opened in 1993, has a collection of nearly 230 works of art by some of India's leading modern masters, including Raja Ravi Varma, M.F. Husain, F.N. Souza, Jamini Roy, Benode Behari Mukherjee, Ramkinker Baij, Ram Kumar and K.G. Subramanyan, among others. The collection was assembled by Madhavan Nayar and his associates over a period of four years. Works were purchased from artists, art collectors and galleries while some were donated by the artists to the museum. The gallery was formally inaugurated in 1993 by then Chief Minister of Kerala, K. Karunakaran.

The Modern Art collection at the Kerala Museum is the only one of its kind accessible to the public in Kerala. The museum has partnered with Google so that over 200 pieces of art from the Kerala Museum Madhavan Nayar Foundation Collection can be viewed online on Google Arts & Culture. 10 specially curated virtual exhibits have been developed for online visitors. They tell the story of India’s most prominent art movements in the 20th Century, notably The Bengal School, Bombay Progressives and the Baroda School.

== Dolls Museum ==
The doll museum has a collection of 150 dolls, depicting diverse cultural groups and dance traditions of India.
