= Edappally =

- Neighborhood
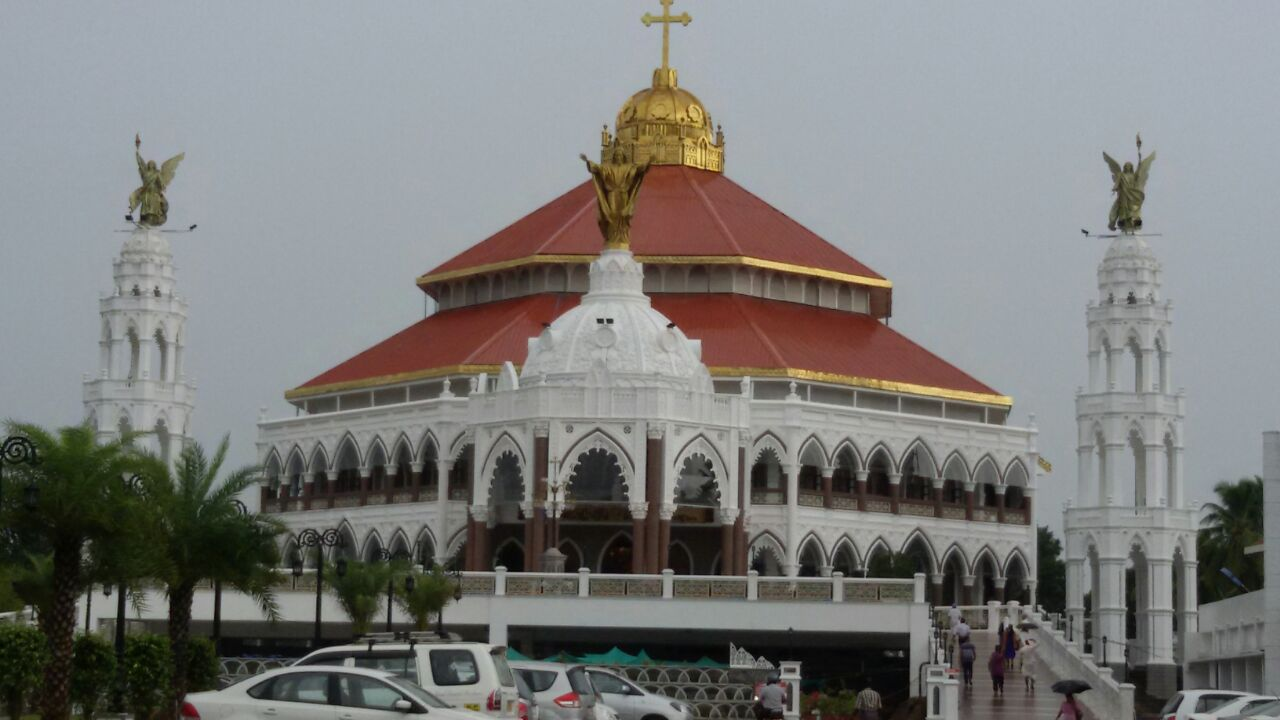

- Location in Kerala, India Edappally (India)
- Coordinates: 10°01′31.3″N 76°18′34.6″E
- Country: India
- State: Kerala
- District: Ernakulam

Area
  - Total: 1.73 km^{2} (0.67 sq mi)

Population (2011)
  - Total: 9,183
  - Density: 5,308/km^{2} (13,750/sq mi)

Languages
  - Official: Malayalam, English
- Time zone: UTC+5:30 (IST)
- PIN: 682024
- Telephone code: 91 (0)484
- Vehicle registration: KL 07
- Climate: Am (Köppen)

Edappally is an urban quarter of the city of Kochi, India. A major commercial centre in Kerala, it is one of the busiest junctions in Kerala. The area is known for its rapid urban development, educational institutions, healthcare facilities, religious landmarks, and large-scale retail centers, including LuLu Mall Kochi, one of India's largest shopping malls.

== History ==
The name “Edappally” is believed to have originated from the famous pilgrimage center of St. George, which was established between the ancient churches of Udayamperoor and Angamaly. The renowned St. George Forane Church, Edappally, dedicated to Saint George the Martyr, was founded midway between the historic Udayamperoor Church and Angamaly Church. Because this church was established “in between” (idappil in Malayalam), the place later came to be known as Edappally.

== Economy ==
Edappally is said to be one of the fastest-growing areas in the city of Kochi. Edappally was the seat of the Edapally Rajas, the rulers of the area. Edappally was a Panchayath before getting included in Cochin Corporation. The Cochin corporation limits start from the traffic signal (Lulu Mall signal) towards Ernakulam and Palarivattom. The area that covers Edappally toll and Lulu Mall is in Kalamassery Municipality limits. This is a place which comes partly under Thrikkakara legislative constituency and partly under Ernakulam constituency.

== Educational institutions ==
Edapally is home to renowned Amrita Vishwa Vidyapeetham University's campus with its Amrita School of Medicine along with Amrita Hospital, Kochi.

Main educational institutions at Edappally are

- Amrita Vishwa Vidyapeetham
- Govt. Higher Secondary School Edappally
- Govt. Vocational and Higher Secondary School – Edappally North
- Al Ameen Public School
- Bharathiya Vidya Bhavan Elamakkara
- Campion School
- St. George's Boys' High School
- St. Pius' Girls' High School
- Government Teacher Training Institute (TTC) Devankulangara
- Jai Bharath B Ed Training College Thrikkakara
- ICS India group of institutions, edappally toll (https://ics-worldwide.com/)
- Traum Academy for German and French Languages
- Regional Centre of MG University for Computer Science and applications.

== Entertainment ==
- Oberon Mall – Oberon Mall is the first full-format mall in Kerala, located on the NH bypass road, just a kilometre from the Edapally Junction. Oberon Mall is built over 350,000 square feet (33,000 m^{2}) and the building stands on about 2 acres (8,100 m^{2}) of land. Oberon Mall also has the first multiplex theatre facility in Kerala.
- LuLu International Shopping Mall – Lulu Mall is the largest shopping mall in India, located in the Edapally neighbourhood of Kochi in Kerala.[1] It is built on an area of 17 acres, with the total area occupied by the mall alone at 1,850,000 square feet 172,000 metres (564,000 ft). A premium five-star 300 room hotel managed by JW Marriott Hotels is located near the mall.
- Changampuzha Samskarika Kendram – consisting of a small children's park, two open auditoriums where programmes are organised almost every day, these programmes include various art forms, literary activities and other cultural items.
- Raghavan Pillai Park – a small park near Ponekkara with a children's play area.
- Edappally Railway Overbridge was inaugurated on 4 February 2012. Edappally North (Kunnumpuram Junction) is the next main junction after Edapally junction, on way to Guruvayur from Ernakulam. Edappally Kunnumpuram Junction is the main junction to turn to Amrita Institute of Medical Sciences(Left Turn), Amrita School of Arts and Science (Right Turn), Manjummel (East Turn), Parur (Straight). Poysha Residents'Association(PRA), Kunnumpuram Central Residents' Association (KCRA), Ambedkar Road Residents'Association(ARRA), Mannam Road Residents' Association (MRRA) 'Vivekananda Road Residents' Association (VRRA) are the major Residents associations here.
- Grand Mall – Grand Mall is owned by Landmark Group who are also owners of popular outlets like Splash, Homecenter, Lifestyle etc. located on the NH bypass road, bang opposite to Lulu Mall towards Vytilla direction.

== Places of worship ==
- The Edappally Ganapathy Temple is one of the most important Ganapathy temples in the state visited by devotees, from all over the state. The temple is referred to in the Aithihya Mala of Kottarathil Sankunni. Visiting time in the morning is between 5.00 and 7.30 AM. The members of the Edappally royal family worship after these hours, since it is their family temple. During the evening time also the temple is kept open. Ganapathy Homam and Unniyappam are important offerings. Unniyappam is booked months in advance. It is believed that Breaking a coconut before beginning a project will see that it is completed successfully.
- Perandoor Bhagavathi Temple, Punnakkal Bhagavathy Temple, Thrikkovil Sree Krishna Temple, Ponekkara Bhagavathy Temple, Chandankulangara Sree Krishna Swamy Temple, Edappally Mariyamman temple, Puthukkulangara Bhagavathi Temple Puthukkalavattam Mahadeva Temple or Puthukulangara Mahavishnu Temple at Kunnumpuram Junction, are other important places of worship.
- St. George Syro-Malabar Catholic Forane Church, Edappally – St. George, the dragon slayer, is the presiding saint. It is under the control of the Syrian Catholic Archeparchy of Ernakulam–Angamaly. Praying at the shrine on the way on any journey is considered auspicious, even by people of other faiths. The offering is simply candles and coins which go into the collection box.
- Blessing Today International Church, Pathadippalam
- The Elamakkara Lourde Matha church is another noted place of worship, which has a history, spanning over 100 years.
- Ponel St. Francis Xavier's Church established in 1927 – Bharat award winner film actor P J Antony buried in the cemetery of the church
- Edappally Juma Masjid

== List of public library ==
Changampuzha Smaraka Library and Edappally North Friends' Library are situated in Edappally. Edappally North Friends' Library celebrated Golden Jubilee in 2007 January. Education and Career Guidance Reference Library started as part of its golden jubilee celebration.

Changampuzha Samskarika Kendram organizes various cultural and academic programmes, which include Kathakali, dramas, music, children's programmes, Akshara slokas, various cultural meetings, discussions, etc. A Senior Citizens' Forum is well functioning attached to this Kendram.

Another institution at Edappally is Changampuzha Smaraka Grandhasala, a library established in 1950 as a memorial to the Malayalam poet Changampuzha Krishna Pillai. This library has a collection of about thirty-six thousand titles and a reference section (approved as the Kanayannur Taluk Reference Library). This has an Art wing offering training in various types of dances, music (vocal and instrumental), painting and drawing, etc. About six hundred students undergo training in these. Beside that there is also the M N F Gallery of Paintings and Sculptures.

== List of residential areas ==
- Amrita Nagar
- Ponekkara
- Elamakkara

== Transport ==
The Cochin bypass connects Edappally with Aroor which is an industrial town on the south end of Cochin. The Bypass Junction in Edappally is the north end of the Cochin bypass which extends up to Aroor. This entire route is evolving into a major business hub with big-time stores and five-star hotels. The world-famous museum of Kerala History and sculpture is also located in Edappally (outside the city limits). Thrikkakkara temple is only 2 kilometres away from Edappally Toll junction, and the village of Vattekkunnam is connected via a railway tunnel.

Two national highways NH 544 and NH 66 join the Kochi Bypass junction at Edappally. At Edappally, The National Highway 66 passes and continues up to Panvel, Maharashtra. Edappally is also connected by rail, and there is a railway station at Edappally. The Edappally Railway Overbrige was inaugurated on 4 February 2012. It helps passengers, so that they can have a convenient journey between Ernakulam-Guruvayoor Route (NH 66). Edappally flyover was constructed in September 2016 to decongest the traffic at Edappally.

Edappally North (Kunnumpuram Junction) is the next main junction after Edappally junction, on the way to Guruvayur from Ernakulam. Edappally Kunnumpuram Junction is the main junction when turning to the Amrita Institute of Medical Sciences (a left turn), Amrita School of Arts and Science (a right turn), Manjummel (a turn to the east), Parur (straight).

There is also the Edappally Metro Station, which is located near Edappally Station Kavala.

== Notable people ==
- Ashanthan, painter and sculptor
- Changampuzha Krishna Pillai, poet
- Edappally Raghavan Pillai, poet
- Vijayalakshmi, poet
- A C Jose, politician
- Aashiq Abu, film maker
- Sijoy Varghese, actor, advertising filmmaker
- Thoppil Anto, singer
