= Ashanthan =

Indian artist (1968–2018)

- Born: Mahesh V. K. 1968; Edappally, Kerala
- Died: 31 January 2018 (aged 49–50)
- Known for: Painting, sculpture
- Awards: Kerala Lalithakala Akademi Award (1998, 1999 and 2007)

Mahesh V. K. better known as Ashanthan (1968 – 31 January 2018) was a painter and sculptor from Kerala, India. He also worked in the amateur theatre. He won the Kerala Lalithakala Akademi Award three times.

== Biography ==
Ashanthan was born in 1968, in Edappally in Eranakulam district of Kerala. His original name was Mahesh V. K. He was born to Kuttappan and Kurumba of Peelyad Thambil house in Ponekara, Edappally. He also served as a teacher of painting and architecture at the Eka Art Gallery in Fort Kochi and the Changampuzha Memorial Library in Edappally.

Ashanthan died on 31 January 2018.

== Career ==
Ashanthan studied painting for four years at 'Chitrashailam' and later worked as a teacher at the same institution for about 10 years. Later, he left his job and devoted his full time to art. He became active in the arts after earning a diploma in painting and sculpture. An expert in various styles of painting, Ashanthan had organized various painting exhibitions within and outside the country. He was also active in amateur theater through directing, acting, and art direction.

Ashanthan worked completely away from the commercial arts scene. Various aspects of nature can be seen in his paintings. Folk arts such as mudiyattam, kathirukala and thudipattu have also been the subject of his paintings.

He has held art exhibitions in over 200 locations, including abroad, and has participated in over 90 art camps.

== Awards and honors ==
Ashanthan received the Kerala Lalithakala Akademi Award in 1998, 1999 and 2007. He also received the first C. N. Karunakaran Memorial Award.

After Ashanthan's death, an exhibition titled 'Shanthasmarana' was organized by the Kerala Lalitha Kala Akademi at the Durbar Hall Art Gallery in Kochi, curated by Shaju Nellai, as a tribute to him. The 2018 Mahatma Gandhi University Art Festival was named Ashantham in his honor. Since 2019, Edappally Vadakkumbhagam Service Cooperative Bank has been organizing a state-level art exhibition and awarding the 'Ashanthan Award' in memory of him.

== Controversy over his corpse ==
The Kerala Lalitha Kala Akademi, the hall's authorities, decided to keep Ashanthan's body at the Durbar Hall Arts Centre in Eranakulam for public viewing. Although the hall and the temple are in different compounds, the officials of the Shiva temple near the hall asked the Akademi officials to leave the body. The temple officials said that the temple pujas had not ended and that keeping the body there for public viewing would defile the temple. Although the Lalitha Kala Akademi activists spoke to the temple authorities, in the meantime a group of people tore down and destroyed the posters and other items displayed at the Durbar Hall.

In response, Akademi Secretary Ponniyam Chandran and Kerala State Culture Minister A. K. Balan said that the opposition was part of the Hindutva agenda. The then Kerala Chief Minister Pinarayi Vijayan commented that some communalists had shown cruelty to the painter's body and were insulting the body by spreading propaganda that the nearby temple would be impure, and that society should isolate such savages. Singer and music director Shahabaz Aman commented that it would be the first time in the history of mankind that an artist has been so humiliated and left this earth. Many artists and cultural activists also protested this disrespect, and Akademi executive member Kavita Balakrishnan resigned from her position.

There was also an argument that the temple authorities objected to placing Ashantan's body in the hall because he was a Dalit, but temple secretary Balagopal said that the temple took this approach not because the deceased was a Dalit, but as part of the temple ritual.
