= Edappally flyover =

Flyover in Kerala

Edappally flyover ഇടപ്പള്ളി മേൽപ്പാലം
- Carries: NH 66
- Locale: Edappally, Kerala, India

Characteristics
- Total length: 433 m (1,421 ft)

History
- Opened: 12 September 2016

Edappally flyover is a flyover in the city of Kochi in Kerala, India. It starts from NH 66 at Lulu Mall and ends at Edappally church on the Edappally- Palarivattom road. It was constructed as a part of the Kochi Metro works to decongest the Edappally junction where the two national highways meets. The flyover was opened to public in September 2016.

== Overview ==
Edappally is a major commercial centre as well as a prominent residential region in Kochi. It is also one of the busiest junctions in Kerala where NH 66 and NH 544 intersects. Before the construction of the flyover, the junction was infamous for traffic congestion and accidents. In June 2013, the foundation stone was laid for the construction of a flyover across Edappally. It was supposed to completed in 20 months. But due to adverse weather and other factors including quarry strike, the project was delayed for more than a year, also missing a couple of deadlines. The flyover was constructed as part of the Kochi Metro works by Delhi Metro Rail Corporation. The project with a total expenditure of the ₹78 crores, including the ₹30 crores spent for properly rehabilitating was opened to public on 12 September 2016. The total length of the flyover is 433 meters. It consists of two independent carriageways on each side of the Metro Rail viaduct. The Edappally junction was also converted into pedestrian-friendly by constructing footpaths on both sides of the roads.
