= Edapally royal family =

Edappally Rajas ("Kings of Edappally", known to the Portuguese as Repolim and to the Dutch as Repleim) were the rulers of the late medieval feudal kingdom of Edappally (Elangallur Swarupam), which also included parts of Kallooppara, Karthikapally, Haripad, Cherthala, Vazhakulam (Muvattupuzha) in the present day state of Kerala, India.

Elangallur Swarupam is one of only two Brahmin royalties in Kerala. Edappally Rajas were great patrons of temples and also known as Edappally Thampurans (Lords of Edappally). They built temples such as the Ganapathy temple at Edappally, Sastha Temple at Thrikkunnapuzha (near Cherthala in Alleppey district) and Perandoor Bhagavathy Temple.

According to local legends and myths, the last king of the Later Chera dynasty divided his kingdom among his various chieftains and governors. At the last minute, he realized that he had not given any land to his royal priests - the Elangallur Namboothiris. He then took back some land from the other lords and gave it to the royal priest family. A new dynasty was created - the Elangallur Swaroopam or the Kingdom of the Elangallur family in Edappally.

== Kallooppaara or Perumbranad district ==
The old Vempolinad was separated into 'Vadakkumkoor' and 'Thekkumkoor' in AD 1100. Kottayam, Chenganacherry, Thiruvalla, Kanjirappally and some places of high range were included in Thekkumkoor kingdom. Kallooppara was under the control of the Thekkumkoor dynasty. It had a Kalari (training center for material arts) at Kallooppara. The Kalari was known as Thekkumkoor Fort which existed until recently. The Thekkumkoor Army camped here and it was risky for the enemy to attack them. The Kings had many close friends in Kallooppara and its surroundings. The Old Nair lord Family at Koipuram in Eraviperoor was in close touch with the kings. It was this Nair Lord family who had great influence on the king and inspired him to donate the Kallooppara sub-division to the Edappally dynasty. With the withdrawal of Thekkumkoor Kings, Kallooppara came under the Edappally dynasty, which is also known as Elangalloor Swaroopam. The Edappally Dynasty has the history of elevation of a temple priest to the royal position of a King. The founder of the Edappally dynasty was a priest of Thrikkakara temple.

The famous St. Marys Valiyapally known as Kalloopparapally constructed with permission of Edappally Raja in AD 1339 (Karkidakam 3 Kollavarsham 515). It is interesting that even today Christians at Kallooppara (nine km from Thiruvalla), Karthikappally, etc. still remember the Edappally Swaroopam for the many privileges received from him and to-date portions of the Edappally Madhom palace on the Manimala riverbank at Kallooppara attracts visitors. It is interesting that the Bhagavathy temple and the Old church at Kallooppara are practically in the same piece of land and the church's architecture is one of the best examples for Kerala Vasthu Shilpa style (For photographs cf. The St. Thomas Christian Encyclopaedia of India, Vol. II, 1973, ed. George Menachery). We may presume that sometime in the 12th century with end of Kulasekhara Perumals, Elangalloor Swaroopam usurped power in the region of Edappally and by the mid-14th century, they held sway over erstwhile Thekkumkoor. thus they became a state with smallest authority but vast landed property outside. This made Edappally the seat of the Brahmin kings, a bone of contention between Zamorin and others. As Zamorin could not wage battles against a Brahmin, in 1536, the first sacking of Edapally took place under Martin D'Souza. The Church at Edapally must have been built during the time of Edapally siege or after. It has typical Portuguese style, while Kallooppara church built before that is close to temple and built in indigenous style. But later, the Edappally king seemed to patronise the church and his Christian subjects as soon after Portuguese had to leave Edappally. The lingering presence of Edapally continues to be mentioned in Portuguese records and VOC or Dutch East India Company Records. Edappally Raja continued customary rights over the church and land was given rent free to church. This is a proof that land was still owned by him. One of the earliest local history initiatives centred on the study of the relationship between Edappally church and Elangalloor Swaroopam. In a small book published in 1990s by Poulose Madekkal in Malayalam, he has given evidence by consulting the church archives to which he had access and tried to establish the miracles of the church influencing the Edappally kings.
