= SN Junction metro station =

Metro station of Kochi Metro

SN Junction

General information
- Coordinates: 9.9547°N 76.3461°E
- System: Kochi Metro rapid transit

History
- Opened: 1 September 2022; 3 years ago

Services
Preceding station	Kochi Metro	Following station
Vadakkekotta towards Aluva	Line 1	Thrippunithura Terminal Terminus
Route map
Location
- Location within Kochi

SN Junction metro station is a metro station of Kochi Metro. It was opened on 1 September 2022 as a part of the extension of the metro system from Pettah to SN Junction. The station depicts ayurveda and its modern approaches as its theme.

== Station layout ==
G	Street level	Exit/Entrance
L1	Mezzanine	Fare control, station agent, Metro Card vending machines, crossover
L2	Side platform | Doors will open on the left
L2	Platform 2 Southbound	Towards → Thrippunithura Terminal
L2	Platform 1 Northbound	Towards ← Aluva next station is Vadakkekotta
L2	Side platform | Doors will open on the left
L2
