= Thoppil Anto =

Indian theatre artist and singer (1940–2021)

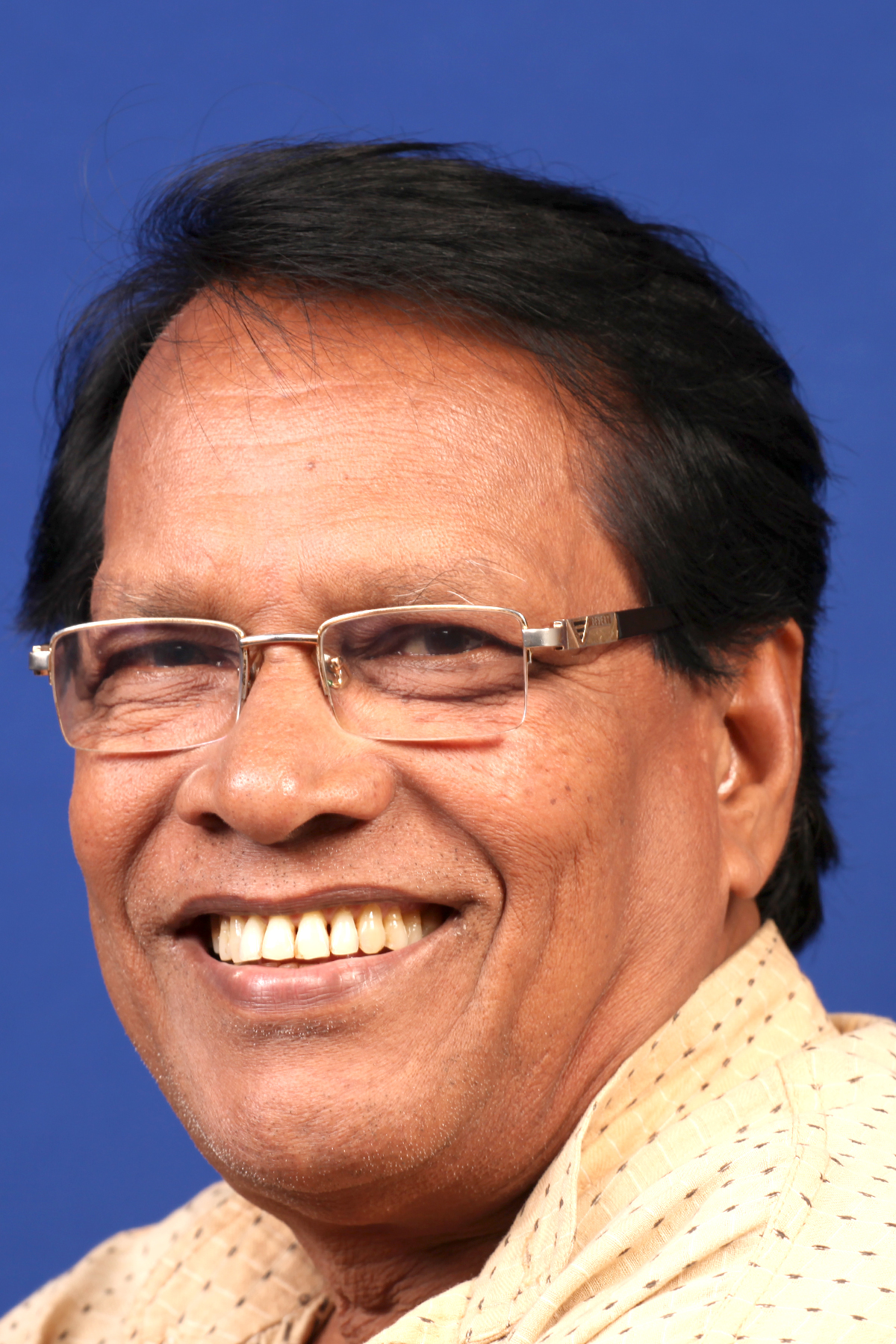

Background information
- Born: Antony (T.K.Anto); 6 June 1940; Edappally, Kochi, Kerala, British India
- Died: 4 December 2021 (aged 81) Edappally, Kochi, Kerala, India
- Genres: Playback singing
- Occupations: Singer, Music Composer
- Instruments: Vocal & Harmonium
- Years active: 1956–2021
- Labels: Audiotracs

Thoppil Anto (6 June 1940 – 4 December 2021) was an Indian theater, and playback singer, stage performer and music composer. He was prominent during the 1970s in Malayalam movies. He sang in Father Damien in (1963)music by M. S. Baburaj, Anubhavangale Nandi in (1976)music by G. Devarajan, Sneham Oru Pravaham in (1979)music by KJ. Joy, Veenapoovu in (1982)music by Vidhyadharan and "HoneyB2" in (2017)music by Deepak Dev. He served as a light music artist with the All-India Radio Thrissur in the 1960s.

== Early life ==
Anto was born as the second child among three children to Thoppil Kunjappu (Chavittu natakam artist) and Eliyamma at Edapally, Kochi. He had his primary education at St. George High School, Edappally.

== Career ==
Anto worked as a playback singer with N. N. Pillai's Nadaka Theater, Vishwa Keralakalasammithi, Kottayam, People's Theater, Kayamkulam and Cochin Samgamithra. He has sung for more than 1000 dramas. He started a music troupe called Cochin Bandor Orchestra and performed on many stages in India and abroad.

== Personal life ==
Anto married Treesa Pynadath with whom he had four children: Mettilda, Anty George (Prem Sagar, music composer), Glancin Thoppil Antony (Gemologist) and Marydas (M'das thoppil anto, singer and music composer). Grand sons: Sam George, Abhishek M. Thoppil, Pishon T. Glancin. Grand daughters: Sandra Sebastian, Vinaya T. Glancin, Ameesha Thoppil, Shreya George, AangelMaria He has a granddaughter, Rachel J. Amirtharaj who is a costume designer.

== Filmography ==
=== Composer ===
- Maayaamayooram - Kalaapam 1998
- Neethimaan - Kalaapam 1998
- Kaakka penne - Kalaapam 1998
- Neelakkadambin - Kalaapam 1998
- Sneha Prakasam- Christian Devotional
- Viyasakra- Devotional, (Kurisinte Vashi)
- Onapookalam- Festival Songs, Production : Century Cassettes
- Oana pookal- Festival Songs Production : Century Cassettes
- Mappila Pattukal - Under the banner, Cochin Harishree (Harindran)
- Papa Song- In connection with the Pope John Paul II visit in Kerala, 1986
- Irumudi- Hindu Devotional, (Sabarimala Songs)
- Changampuzha Kavithakal - Musical version of Poet Shri. Changampuzha Krishnapillai's poems, Sung by P. Jayachandran, K. G. Markose, Janaki Devi etc.
- Raaja Hamsam - Folk Songs, Singers: Minmini, Balagopalan Thambi & Thoppil Anto
- Divya Darsanam - Devotional, Lyrics: Dr.Cheriyan Kunianthodath, C.M.I.
- Kripa Sooryan - Christian Devotional, Lyrics by Dr. Cheriyan Kunianthodath, Sung by M'das (Marydas), 2015

=== As a singer ===
- Aadithyananayum - Ragging 1973, Music by M. K. Arjunan
- Maanodum mala - Anubhavangale Nandi 1979, Music by G. Devarajan
- Maalaveppaan Vanniha - Veenapoovu 1983, Music by Vidyadharan
- Ding Dong (Puthan Thalamura) - Ellaavarkkum Nanmakal (Puthan Thalamura) 1987
- Nummade Kochi : Honey Bee 2 2017 Music by Deepak Dev

== Recognition ==
- Kerala Sangeetha Nataka Akademi Award for light music (1982)
- Pravasi Pranava Dhwani Puraskar (2010)
- Changampuzha Samskarika Kendram award
- Catholic Congress Award in 2016
- Greenix Award
- KCBC MEDIA AWARD in 2011
- Chakola Open Rosy Memorial Award in 2014
- ഗുരു വന്ദന പുരസ്കാരം by Television chamber Music Union in 2015
- Jaycey Foundation Award in 2006
- Life Time Achievement Award by തൃക്കാക്കര ഗ്രാമ പഞ്ചായത്ത് ഫൈൻ ആർട്സ് സൊസൈറ്റി 2007
- Asia Music Institute Award, Dubai
- Life Time Achievement Award by ശിവഗിരി ശാരദ കലാ സമിതി 2016
- Life Achievement Award by Sangam Kala Group in 2013
