= Companypady metro station =

Metro station in Kochi, India

Companypady

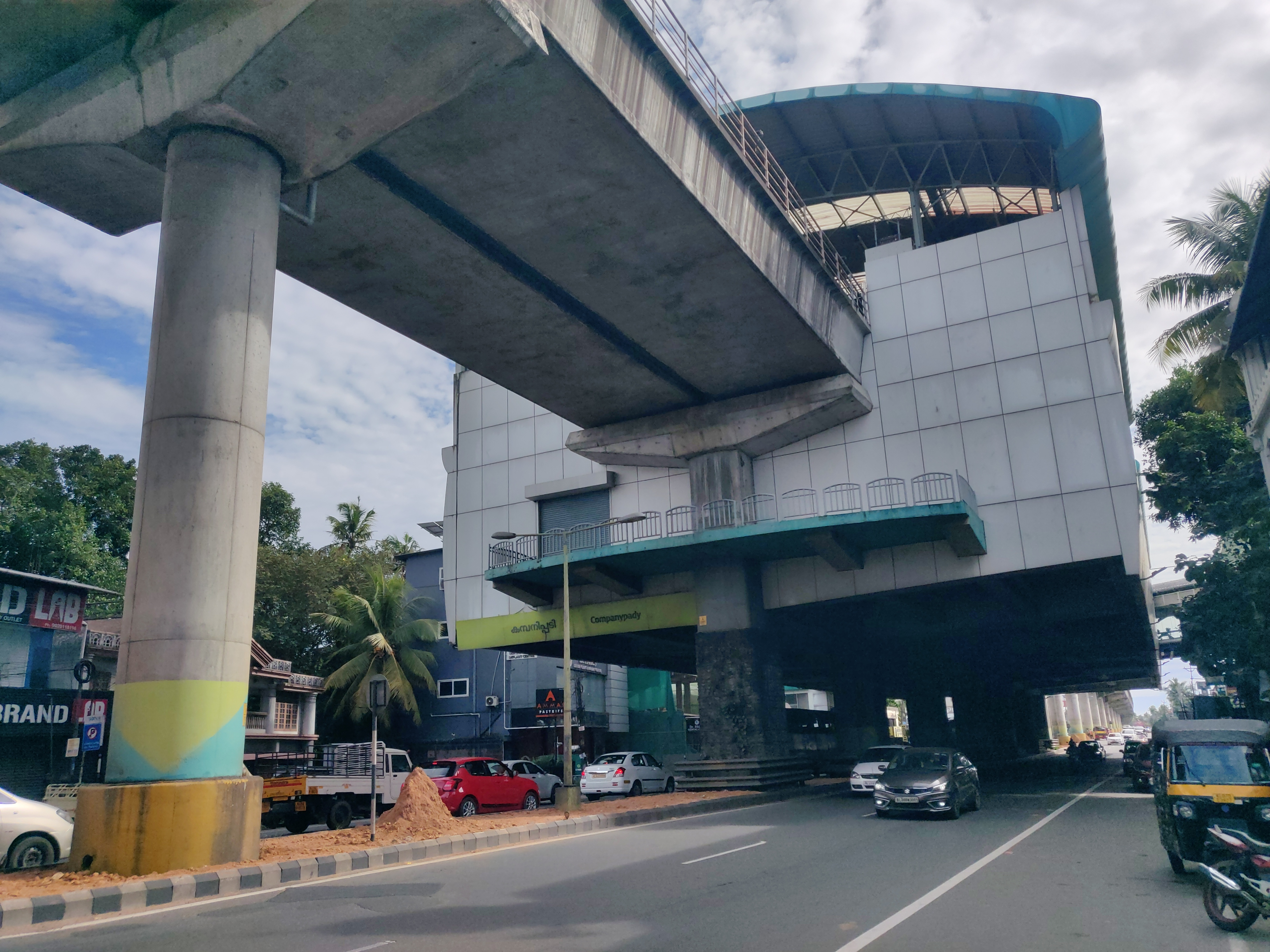
- Companypady metro station

General information
- Location: India
- Coordinates: 10.087293°N 76.342840°E
- System: Kochi Metro rapid transit
- Owner: KMRL
- Tracks: 2

Construction
- Parking: Not available

History
- Opened: June 19, 2017; 9 years ago

Services
Preceding station	Kochi Metro	Following station
Pulinchodu towards Aluva	Line 1	Ambattukavu towards Thrippunithura Terminal
Route map
Location
- Location within Kerala

Companypady is a station of Kochi Metro. The station is located between Pulinchodu and Ambattukavu.

It was inaugurated by the Prime Minister of India Narendra Modi on 17 June and opened for public on 19 June 2017 as a part of the first stretch of the metro system, between Aluva and Palarivattom.
