= Cochin University metro station =

Metro station in Kochi, India

Cochin University

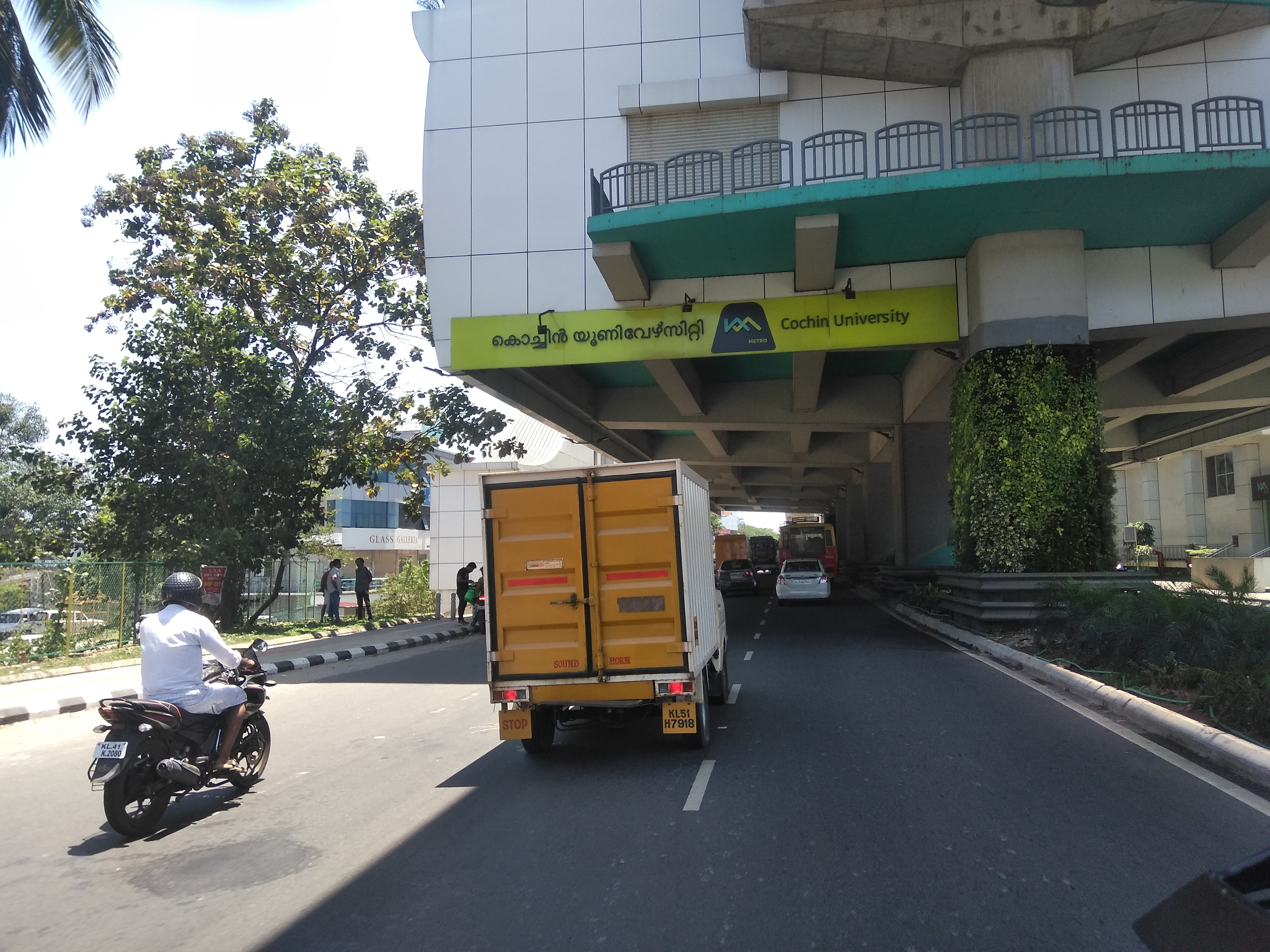

General information
- Location: CUSAT Junction, Kochi, Kerala; India
- Coordinates: 10.046879°N 76.318377°E
- System: Kochi Metro rapid transit
- Owner: KMRL
- Platforms: 2

Construction
- Parking: Available

History
- Opened: June 19, 2017; 9 years ago

Services
Preceding station	Kochi Metro	Following station
Kalamassery towards Aluva	Line 1	Pathadipalam towards Thrippunithura Terminal
Route map
Location
- Location within Kochi

Cochin University is a station of Kochi Metro. The station is located between Kalamassery and Pathadipalam, close to Cochin University of Science and Technology.

It was inaugurated by the Prime Minister of India Narendra Modi on 17 June and opened for public on 19 June 2017 as a part of the first stretch of the metro system, between Aluva and Palarivattom.
