= Changampuzha Park metro station =

Metro station in Kochi, India

Changampuzha Park

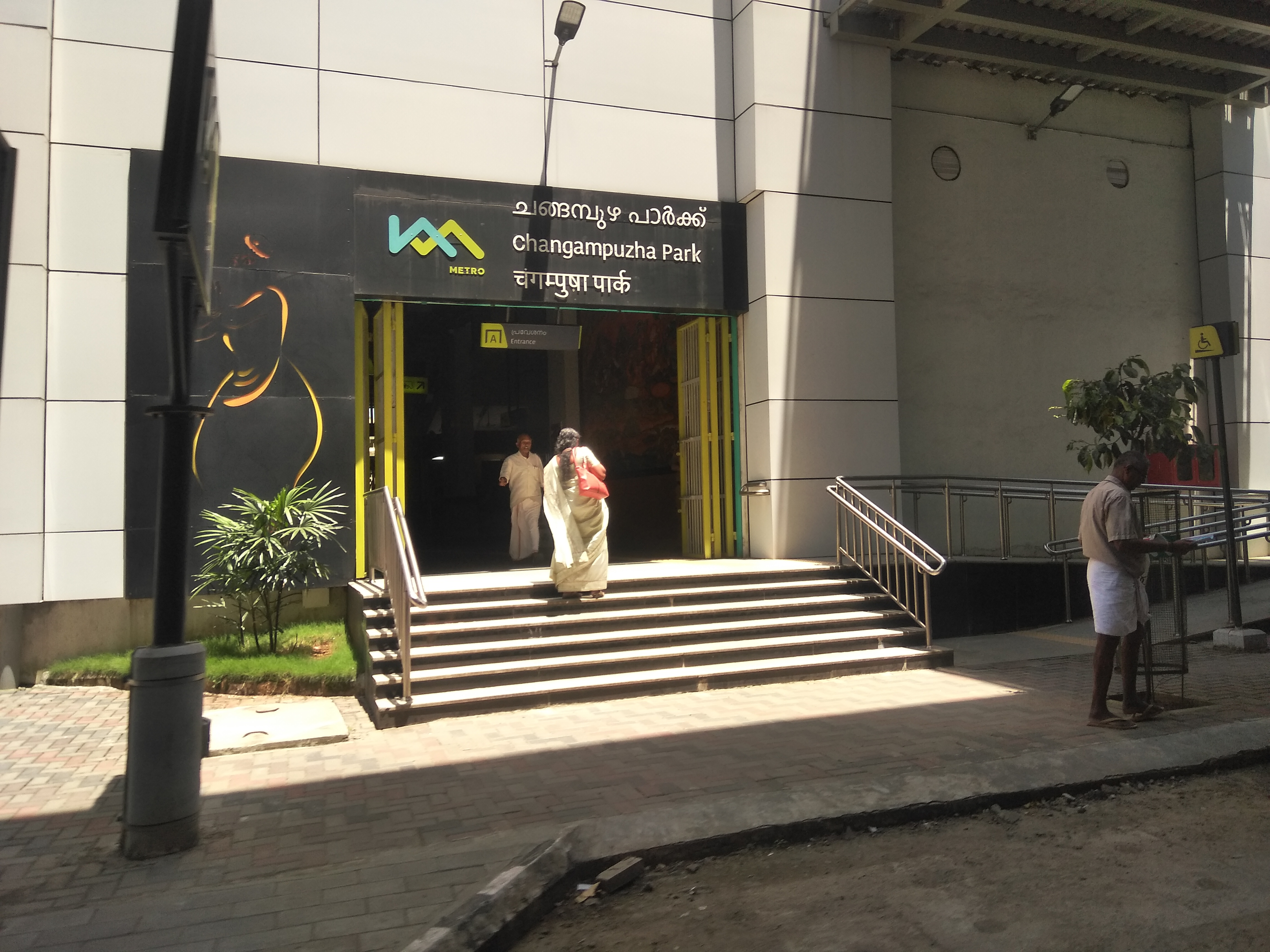

General information
- Coordinates: 10.014880°N 76.302319°E
- System: Kochi Metro rapid transit
- Owner: KMRL

Construction
- Parking: Available

History
- Opened: 19 June 2017

Services
Preceding station	Kochi Metro	Following station
Edapally towards Aluva	Line 1	Palarivattom towards Thrippunithura Terminal
Route map
Location
- Location within Kochi

Changampuzha Park is a station of Kochi Metro. It was inaugurated by the Prime Minister of India Narendra Modi on 17 June and opened for public on 19 June 2017 as a part of the first stretch of the metro system, between Aluva and Palarivattom. The station is located between Edapally and Palarivattom, close to the Changampuzha Park.
