= Edapally metro station =

Metro station in Kochi, India

Edapally

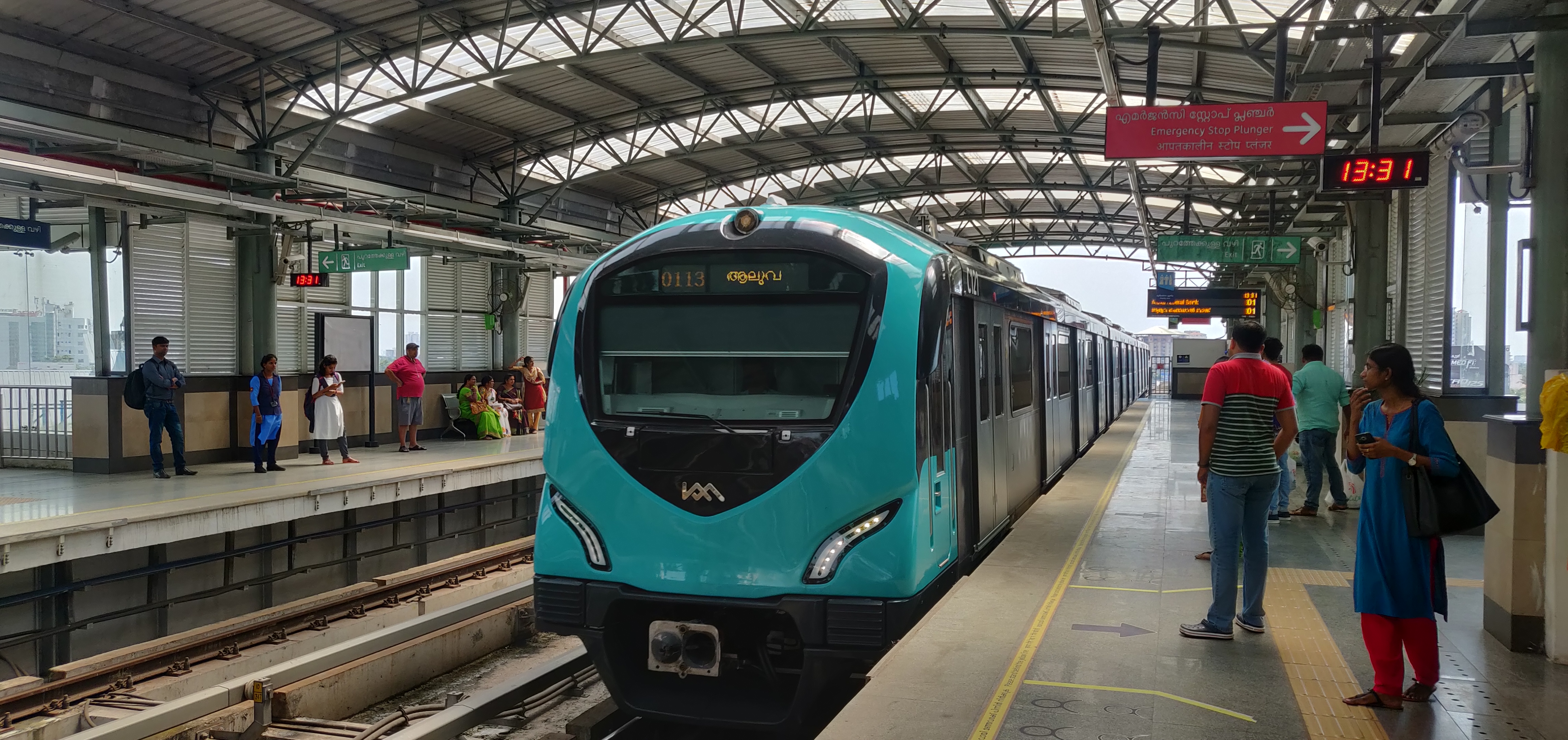

General information
- Location: Edapally Junction, Kochi, Kerala
- Coordinates: 10.025106°N 76.308456°E
- System: Kochi Metro rapid transit
- Owner: KMRL
- Tracks: 2

Construction
- Parking: Available; Car (50) Bike (55)

History
- Opened: 19 June 2017

Services
Preceding station	Kochi Metro	Following station
Pathadipalam towards Aluva	Line 1	Changampuzha Park towards Thrippunithura Terminal
Route map
Location
- Location within Kochi

Edapally is a station of Kochi Metro. The station is located between Pathadipalam and Changampuzha Park, in the area of Edappally.

It was inaugurated by the Prime Minister of India Narendra Modi on 17 June and opened for public on 19 June 2017 as a part of the first stretch of the metro system, between Aluva and Palarivattom.

== Location ==
Edappally metro station is located over the Edappally junction, which is one of the busiest road junctions in Kerala.

It is one of the busiest stations of Kochi Metro due to its proximity to major landmarks such as Edappally church and Lulu Mall. Post the opening of the skywalk bridge connecting the 2nd floor of Lulu Mall with the entrance building of the station, the metro station has emerged as the primary access point for people heading to Lulu Mall.

== Nearby ==
- Edappally Church
- Lulu Mall
- Oberon Mall
