= Nedumbassery =

Census town in Kerala, India

- Census town
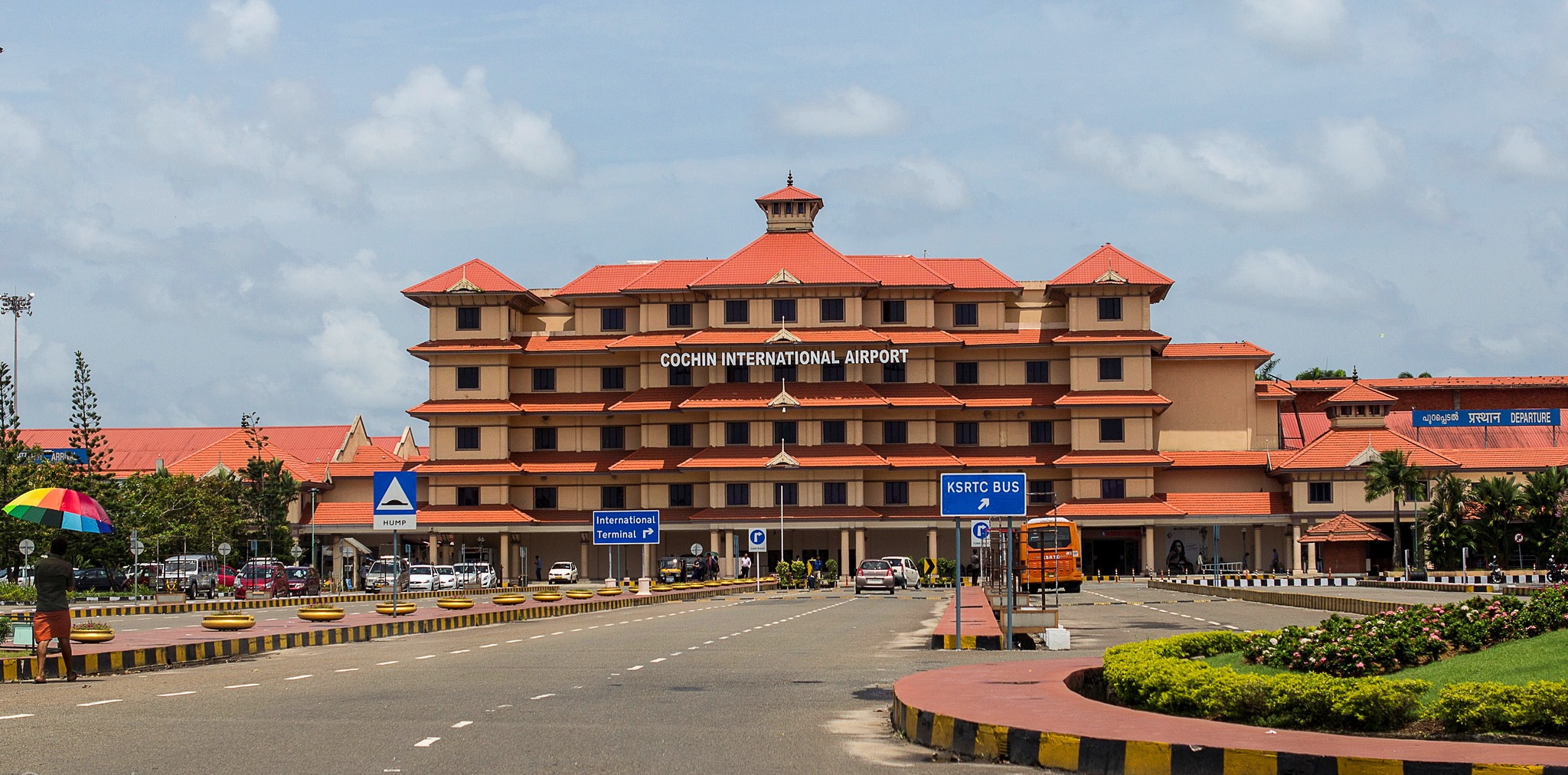
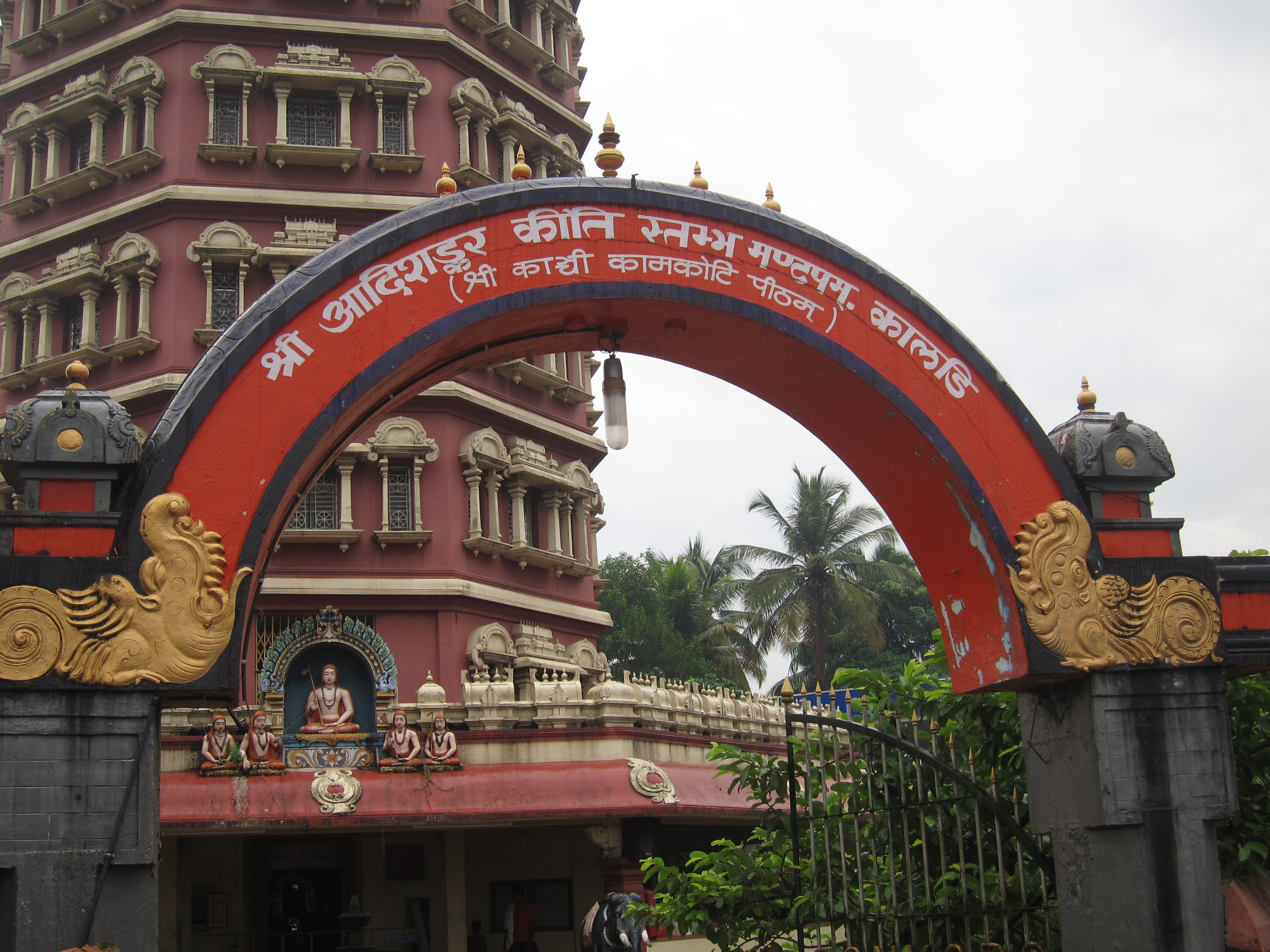
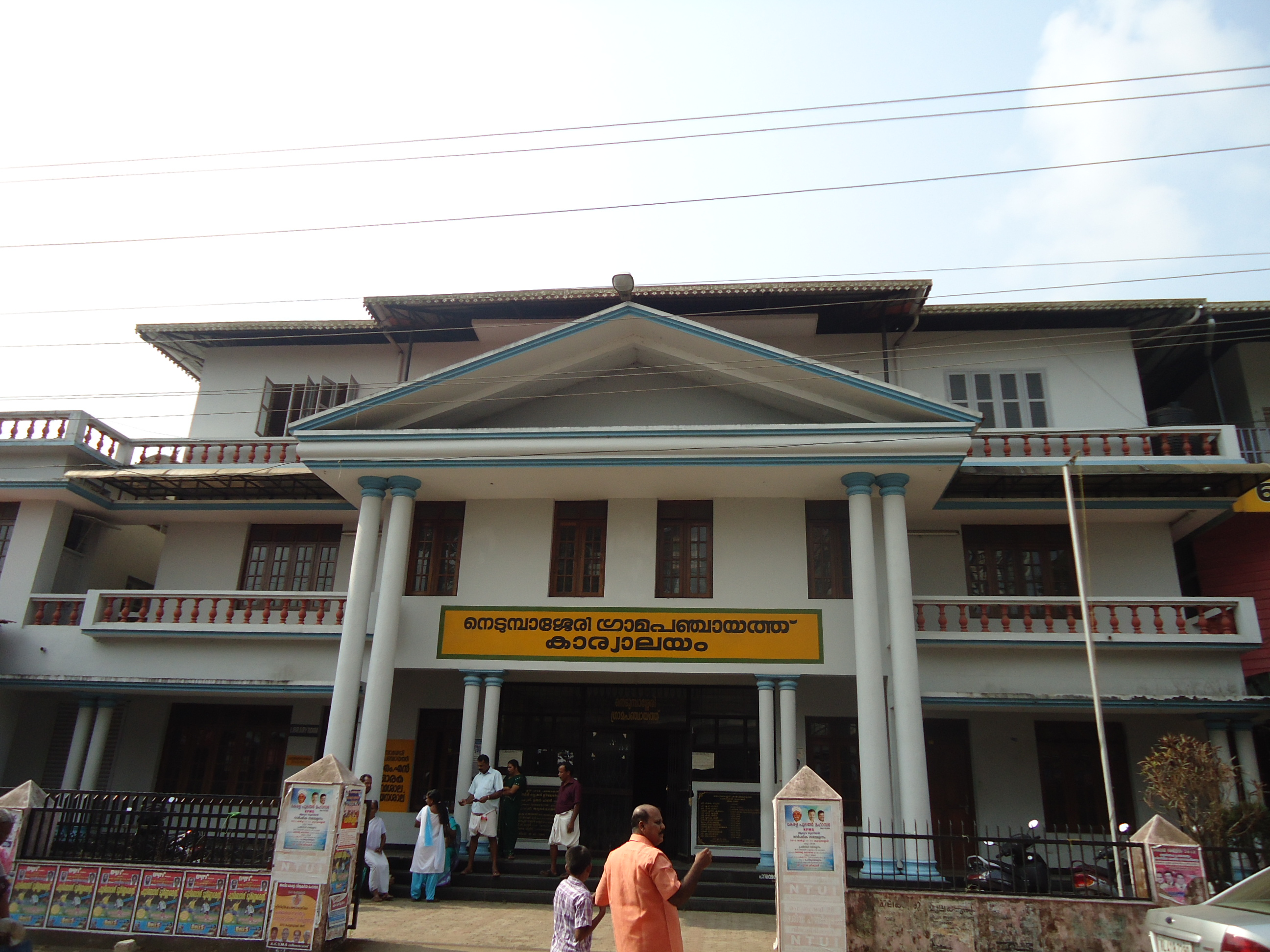
- From top to bottom: Cochin International Airport; Adi Shankara Tower; Nedumbassery Panchayat office
- Interactive map of Nedumbassery
- Coordinates: 10.1167°N 76.3500°E
- Country: India
- State: Kerala
- District: Ernakulam
- Taluk: Aluva
- Block panchayat: Parakkadavu
- Gram panchayat: Nedumbassery
- Village: Nedumbassery
- Elevation: 8 m (26 ft)

Population (2001)
  - Total: 28,607

Languages
  - Official: Malayalam, English
- Time zone: UTC+5:30 (IST)
- PIN: 683585/683589
- Telephone code: 0484
- Vehicle registration: KL-63

Nedumbassery (IPA: [n̪eɖumbɐːʃːeːɾi]) is suburb of the city of Kochi in Kerala, India and home to the Cochin International Airport. In administration, it comes under the Nedumbassery panchayat in the Aluva taluk of Ernakulam district. Situated between Angamaly and Aluva, it is home to Cochin International Airport.

== Location ==
As per the 2011 census, Nedumbassery is classified as a census town (CT). It is located within the Nedumbassery gram panchayat in the Parakkadavu block panchayat of Aluva taluk in Ernakulam district, Kerala, India. The panchayat comprises two villages—Nedumbassery and Chengamanad. Nedumbassery is part of the Chalakudy Lok Sabha constituency and Aluva Assembly constituency.

== History ==
The rice paddy fields in and around Nedumbassery were once a granary to the people of Kerala. The paddy fields are fertile as a result of the nearby Periyar river and its branches which fertile the land with abundant crops. The paddy fields of Nedumbassery were selected for study by Government of India for the Japanese delegation who conducted study of paddy cultivation at Nedumbassery in the 1960s. The Japanese agricultural scientist recorded in detail the cultivation techniques of the people in Nedumbassery for their research.

Nedumbassery is also the home town of Jacobite Syrian Bishop late 'Gewargis Mor Gregorios, BA, LT of Vayaliparambil Pynadath family(1899–1966), a leader, agriculturist and an educationalist who managed "High school to an Engineering college" (1960s) and started a silent educational revolution in India as early as 1939 in pre-independent British India. HG.Mor Gregorios Vayaliparambil was the first Chairman of Mor Athanasious College Association, Kothamangalam.

The sites of Mor Sabor and Afroth Jacobite Syrian Orthodox Cathedral were built in 825 AD and named after two Syrian Orthodox bishops who arrived India in 825 AD, Mor Sabor and Mor Afroth. The Patriarchs of Antioch who visited India have visited this ancient cathedral in Nedumbassery starting with HH.Patriarch Ignatious Peter IV of Antioch in 1876. Malankara Metropolitan Bishop St. Athanasius Paulose Pynadath (1918–53) of Jacobite Syrian Orthodox Church frequently visited Mor Sabor and Mor Afroth Jacobite Church in Nedumbassery as it was his home parish. This church was a decision making centre of Jacobite Syrian Church of India as all Indian bishops and middle East Syriac bishops routinely visited here..

== Education ==
An English High school was built at Nedumbassery in 1939 by Jacobite Syrian Bishop H.E. Mor Gregorios Vayaliparambil (also the first chairman of Mor Athanasious College Association, Kothamangalam) and was known as 'Mor Athanasious High School'. This school provided education to all people in the nearby areas including Angamaly and Perumbavur. The school has been a source of education to all classes of people and has produced many IAS officers and top bureaucrats for India. In 1949 Mor Gregorios Vayaliparambil Pynadath constructed a new church in Nedumbassery, opposite his school known as St.George Jacobite Syrian Church.

== Economy ==
There was a manufacturing unit built using Japanese collaboration functioning here in the late 1960s called 'Toshiba Anand' which was since then decommissioned. A state-owned heavy agro machinery industry called 'KAMCO' (Kerala Agro Machinery Corporation Ltd) is also functioning here. The Japanese delegation of agricultural scientist had conducted study of paddy cultivation in Nedumbassery in a joint venture with Government of India in the 1960s. Nedumbassery was historically used for rice cultivation and large paddy fields - prior to airport land acquisition.

There is a Panchayat office and post office at Kariyad in Nedumbassery.

=== Cochin International Airport ===
Nedumbassery is the location of Cochin International Airport, the first airport in India built from a P3 development portfolio. It also houses the airport's solar plant, making it the first fully solar powered airport in India and the world. Due to its location, the airport is colloquially referred to as Nedumbassery Airport among the local populace. As a result of the previous geography of Nedumbassery, the entire airport was built by filling vast paddy fields with special government permission.

The airport has since has been the principal airport serving Kerala, being key contributor to the economic growth of Nedumbassery and Greater Kochi, since initial civil operations were transferred from the INS Garuda naval enclave within the city east of Kochi. In addition, it has become the eighth largest airport in terms of passenger movement within India as of 2024.

A new approach road has been built exclusively from the NH544 to the airport and new hotels and businesses have come up on the sides on the new road with a bridge above the railway underpass, in alignment with aerotropolis design plans of Nedumbassery. A railway station is also being constructed at Nedumbassery.
