= Cochin Airport railway station =

Planned Railway station in Kerala, India

Cochin Airport Railway Station

General information
- Location: Nedumbassery, Kochi, Kerala; India
- Coordinates: 10.1501°N 76.3808°E
- System: Indian Railway Station
- Owner: Indian Railways
- Line: Shoranur–Cochin Harbour section
- Platforms: 2
- Tracks: 2
- Connections: Cochin International Airport; Kochi Airport Metro station; Kochi Airport Water metro station

Construction
- Structure type: At-grade
- Parking: YES

Other information
- Fare zone: Southern Railway

History
- Opened: September 2027

Services
| Preceding station | Indian Railways | Following station |
|---|---|---|
| Angamaly towards Shoranur Junction | Southern Railway zone Shoranur–Cochin Harbour section | Chovara towards Cochin Harbour Terminus |
Route map
Location
- Location within India Location within Kerala

The Cochin Airport railway station (also called Nedumbassery Halt) is an under-construction Indian railway station in Thiruvananthapuram railway division of Southern Railway zone.

== Construction ==
Though the main railway line is only about 500 metres from the airport, the nearest station is Angamaly about 5 km away. A railway station with two platforms each capable of accommodating trains with up to 24 coaches, has been proposed to be built near the Airport at a cost of about ₹19 Crores. From the proposed station, travellers can reach the airport by taking a 1.5-kilometre road that passes beneath the Railway Over Bridge. Cochin International Airport Limited, the operator of the Airport has also indicated its willingness to operate electric buses connecting the new railway station and the airport. .

The Indian Railways gave an internal approval for the project in October 2025. Construction was scheduled to begin in December 2025 following a site inspection on 18 November 2025. Plans include building a station, a foot overbridge, an air-conditioned waiting hall, a ticket counter and two lifts. The project will be built under PM Gati Shakthi and plans include a 600-metre-long platform for Vande Bharat services. Following final approval, construction of the Station started on September 03 2026. The Southern railways plans to commission the station within one year. The station is located less than 1.5 kilometers from the airport's runway. It is beign constructed as a Halt station. The station is being built on the main line, and not a parallel loop, meaning that only a few select high-speed express trains are planned to stop at the station. The Station is planned to be linked to the Kochi metro and Kochi Water metro terminals nearby.

== See Also ==
- Edappally railway station
