= Kalamassery metro station =

Metro station in Kochi, India

Kalamassery

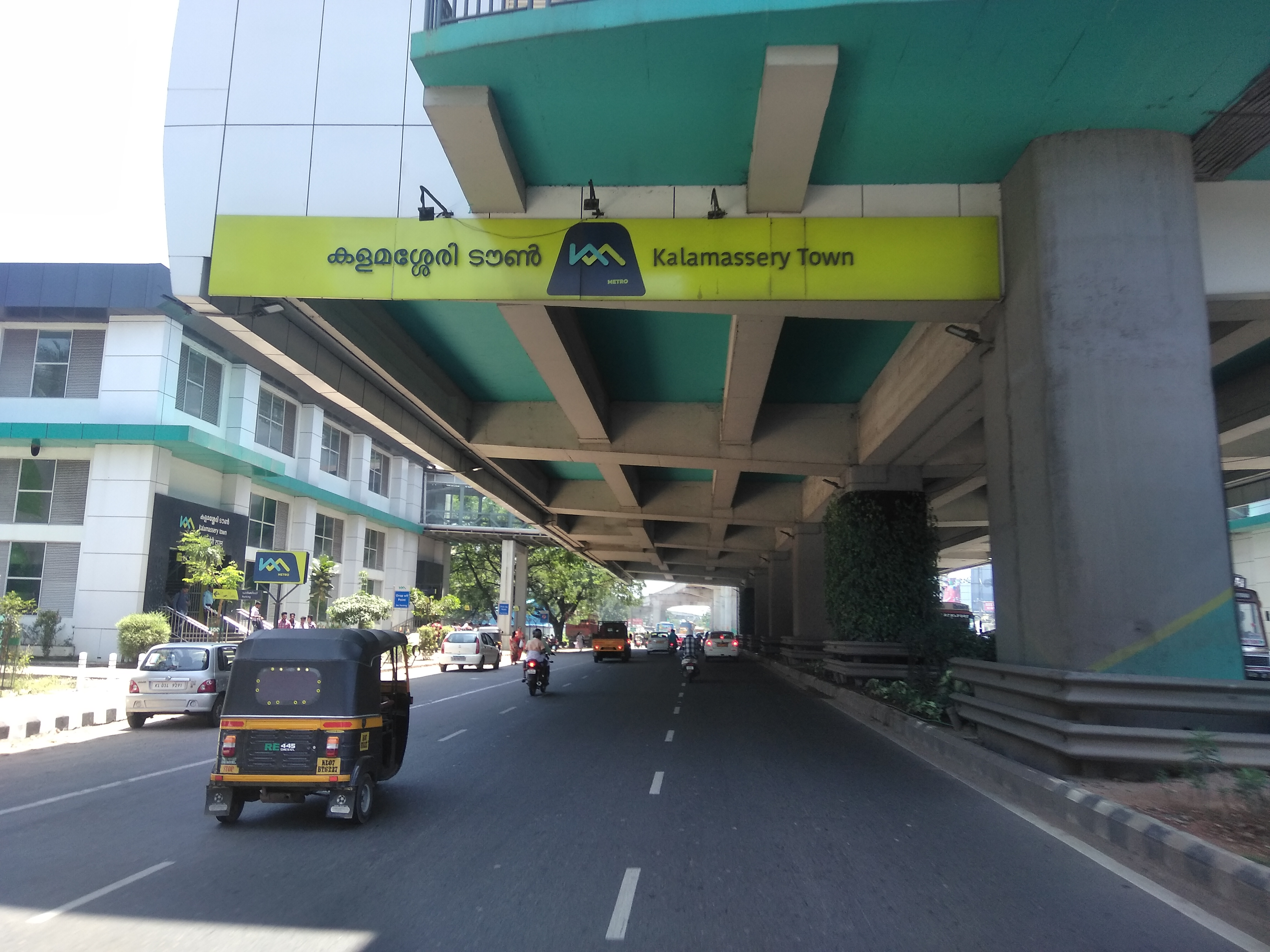

General information
- Location: Kalamassery Town
- Coordinates: 10.058400°N 76.321926°E
- System: Kochi Metro rapid transit
- Owner: KMRL
- Platforms: 2

Construction
- Parking: Available

History
- Opened: 19 June 2017

Services
Preceding station	Kochi Metro	Following station
Muttom towards Aluva	Line 1	Cochin University towards Thrippunithura Terminal
Route map
Location
- Location within Kochi

Kalamassery is a station of Kochi Metro. The station is located between Muttom and Cochin University, in the municipality of Kalamassery.

It was inaugurated by the Prime Minister of India Narendra Modi on 17 June and opened for public on 19 June 2017 as a part of the first stretch of the metro system, between Aluva and Palarivattom.
