= Ambattukavu metro station =

Metro station in Kochi, India

Ambattukavu

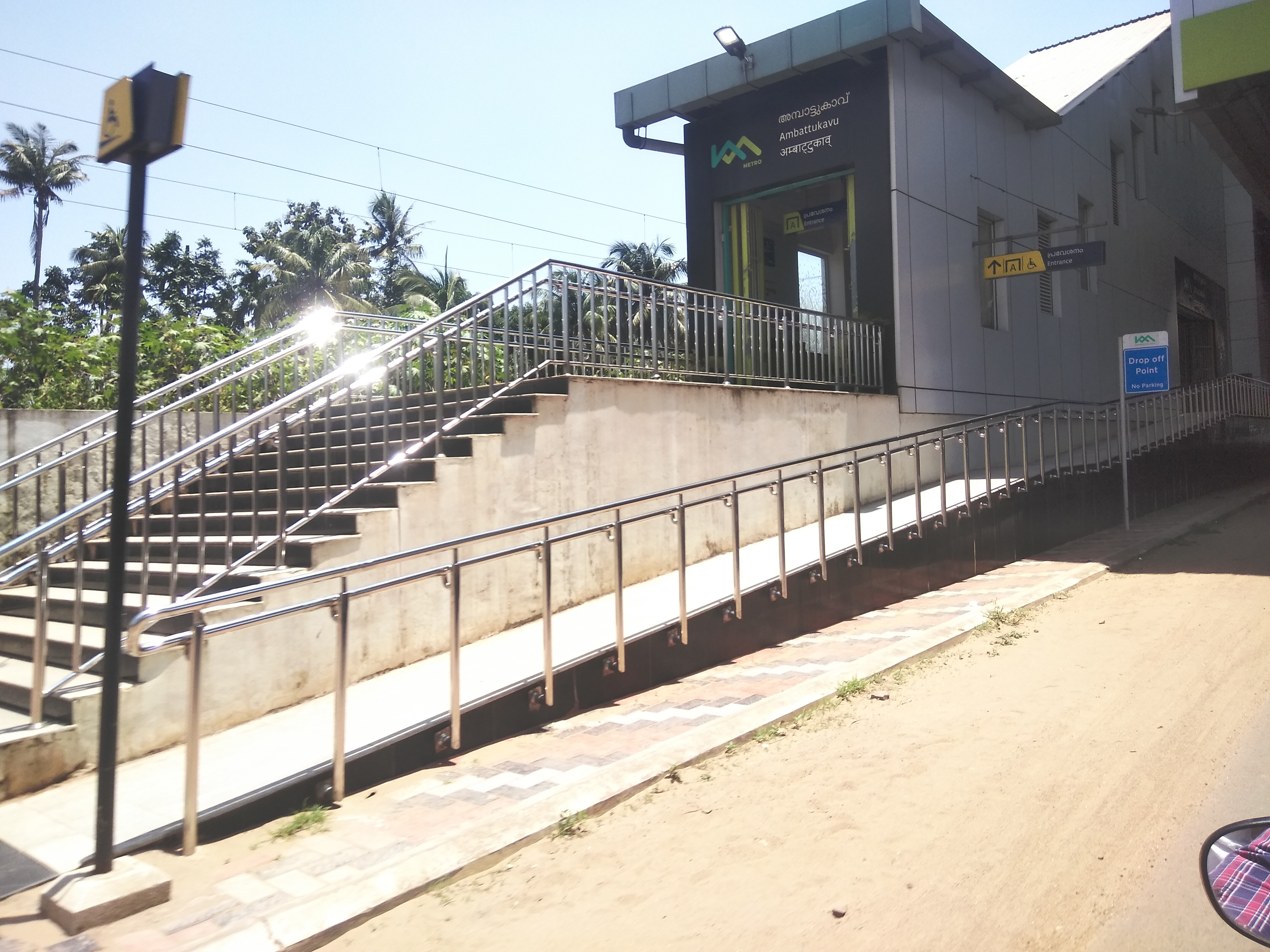

General information
- Coordinates: 10.079372°N 76.339004°E
- System: Kochi Metro rapid transit
- Owner: KMRL

History
- Opened: 19 June 2017

Services
Preceding station	Kochi Metro	Following station
Companypady towards Aluva	Line 1	Muttom towards Thrippunithura Terminal
Route map
Location
- Location within Kochi

Ambattukavu is a station of Kochi Metro. It was inaugurated by the Prime Minister of India, Narendra Modi, on 17 June 2017 and opened for public on 19 June as a part of the first stretch of the metro system, between Aluva and Palarivattom. The station is located between Companypady and Muttom.
