= Muttom metro station =

Metro station in Kochi, India

Muttom

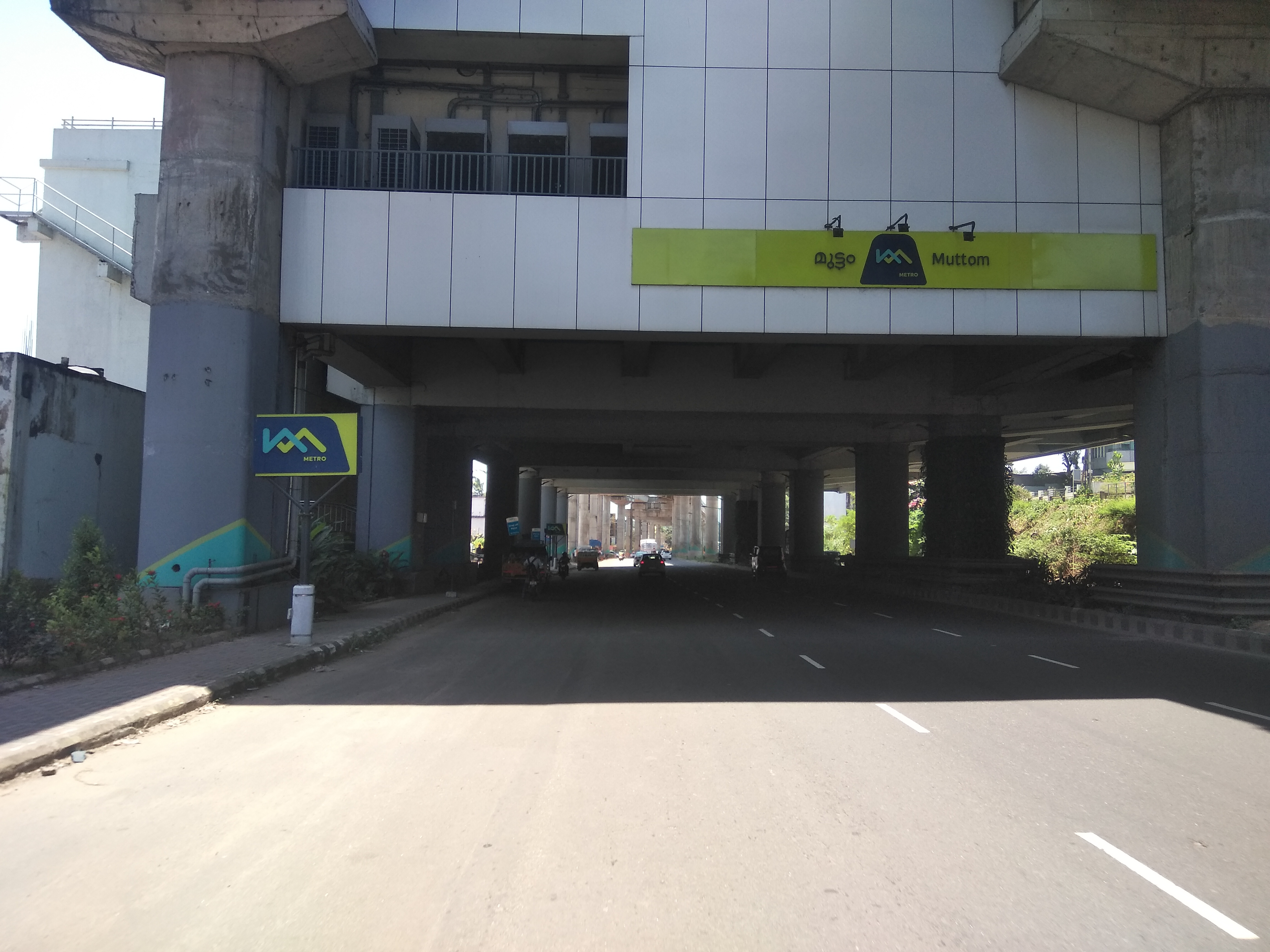

General information
- Location: Muttom
- Coordinates: 10.072575°N 76.333727°E
- System: Kochi Metro rapid transit
- Owner: KMRL
- Platforms: 2 active

Construction
- Parking: Available

History
- Opened: 19 June 2017

Services
Preceding station	Kochi Metro	Following station
Ambattukavu towards Aluva	Line 1	Kalamassery towards Thrippunithura Terminal
Route map
Location
- Location within Kochi

Muttom is a station of Kochi Metro. The station is located between Ambattukavu and Kalamassery. The service line to the Metro Operations Control Centre and the train yard at Muttom branches off from here.

It was inaugurated by the Prime Minister of India Narendra Modi on 17 June and opened for public on 19 June 2017 as a part of the first stretch of the metro system, between Aluva and Palarivattom.
