= Vadakkekotta metro station =

Metro station in Kochi, India

Vadakkekotta

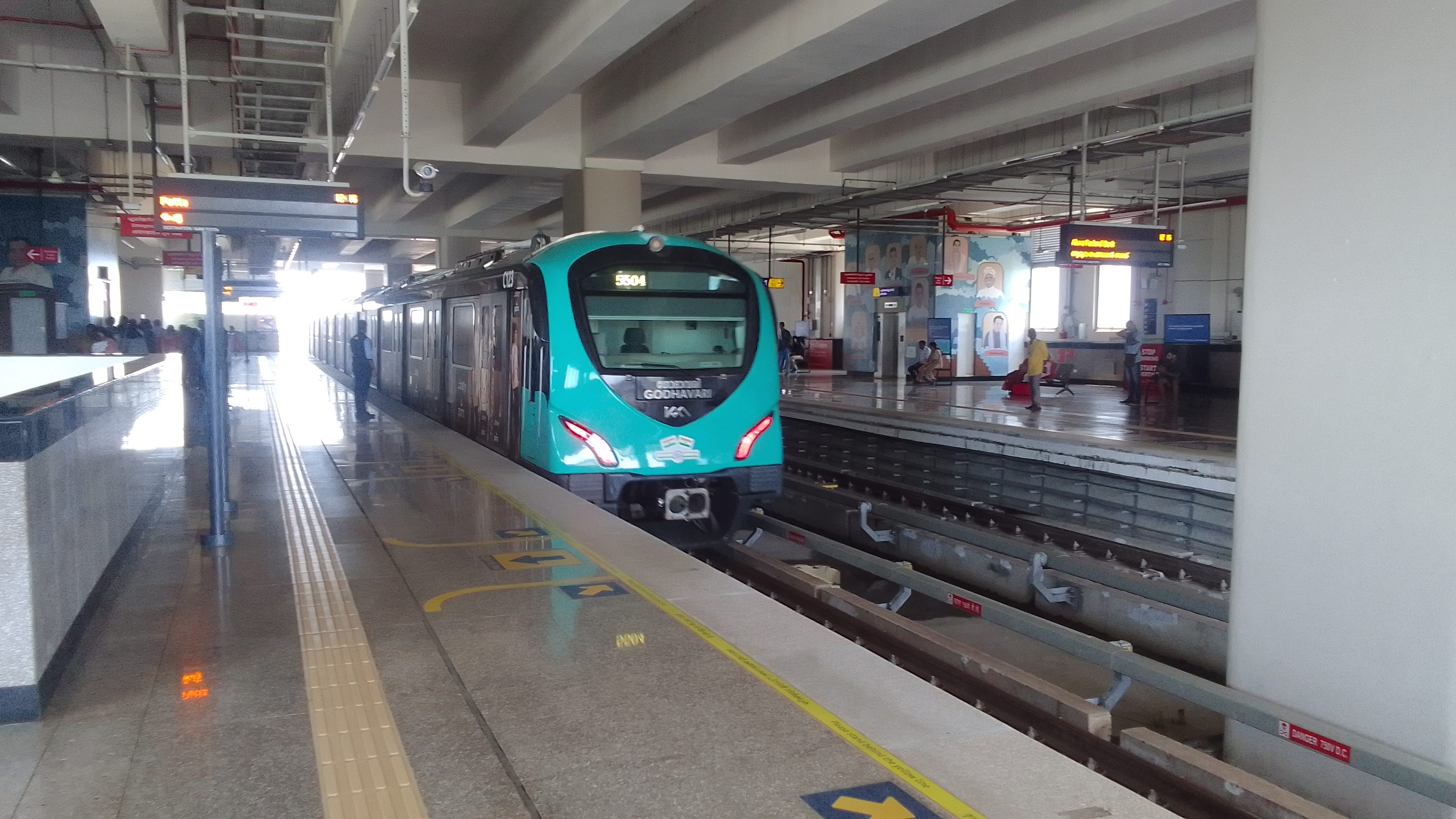

General information
- Location: India
- Coordinates: 9.9528°N 76.3395°E
- System: Kochi Metro rapid transit

Other information
- Station code: VKT

History
- Opened: 1 September 2022; 3 years ago

Services
Preceding station	Kochi Metro	Following station
Pettah towards Aluva	Line 1	SN Junction towards Thrippunithura Terminal
Route map
Location
- Location within Kochi

Vadakkekotta metro station is a metro station of Kochi Metro in India. It was opened on 1 September 2022 as a part of the extension of the metro system from Petta to SN Junction. Spread over an area of 4.3 lakh square feet, it is Kochi Metro’s biggest station. The station features Kerala's role in freedom struggle as its theme.

== Station layout ==
G	Street level	Exit/Entrance
L1	Mezzanine	Fare control, station agent, Metro Card vending machines, crossover
L2	Side platform | Doors will open on the left
L2	Platform 2 Southbound	Towards → ThrippunithuraTerminal next station is SN Junction
L2	Platform 1 Northbound	Towards ← Aluva next station is Pettah
L2	Side platform | Doors will open on the left
L2
