= Pathadipalam metro station =

Metro station in Kochi, India

Pathadipalam

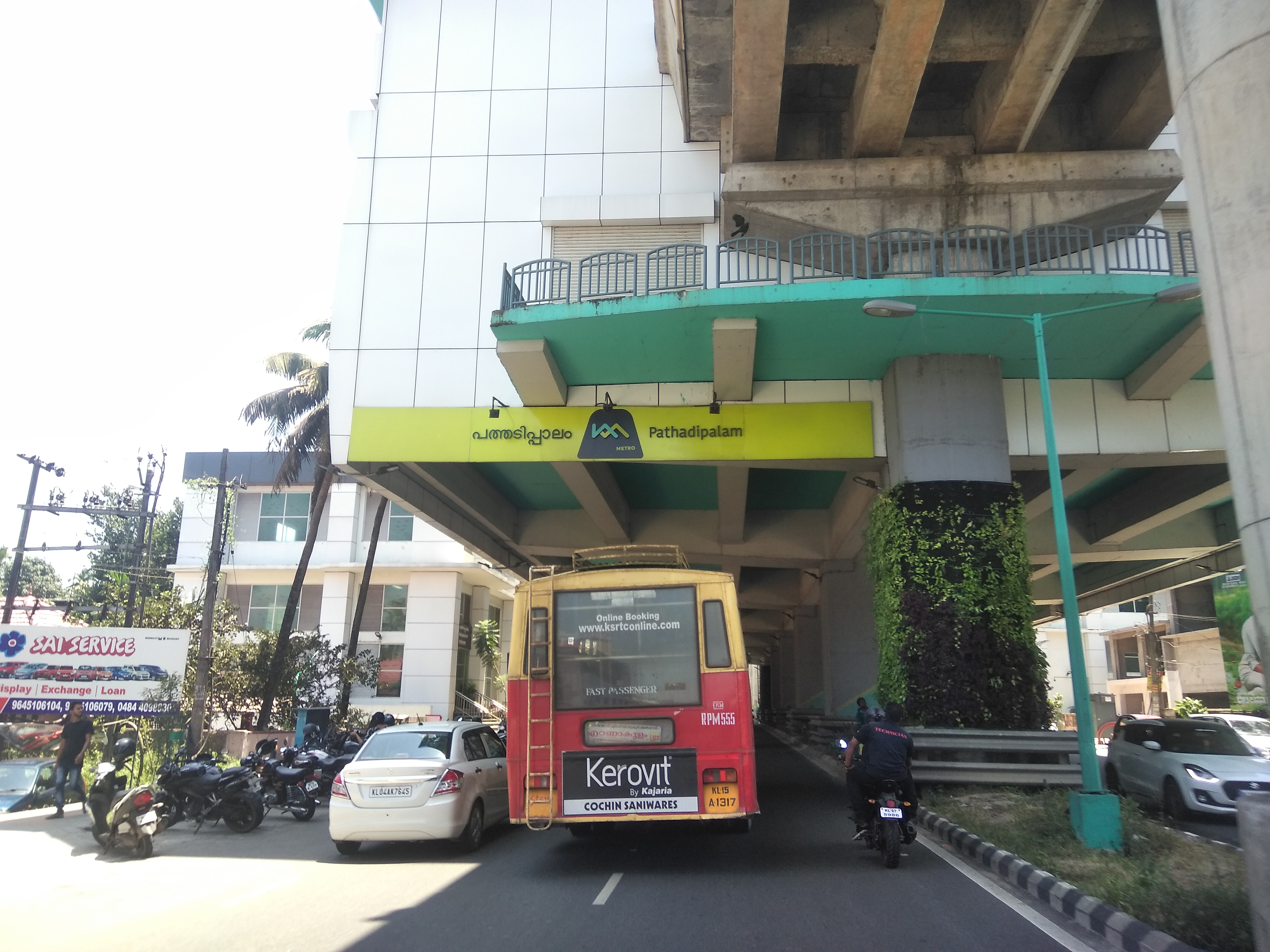

General information
- Location: Pathadipalam
- Coordinates: 10.035948°N 76.314371°E
- System: Kochi Metro rapid transit
- Owner: KMRL
- Platforms: 2

Construction
- Parking: Not available

History
- Opened: 19 June 2017

Services
Preceding station	Kochi Metro	Following station
Cochin University towards Aluva	Line 1	Edapally towards Thrippunithura Terminal
Route map
Location
- Location within Kochi

Pathadipalam is a station of Kochi Metro.The station is located between Cochin University and Edapally.

It was inaugurated by the Prime Minister of India Narendra Modi on 17 June and opened for public on 19 June 2017 as a part of the first stretch of the metro system, between Aluva and Palarivattom.
