= Pulinchodu metro station =

Metro station in Kochi, India

Pulinchodu

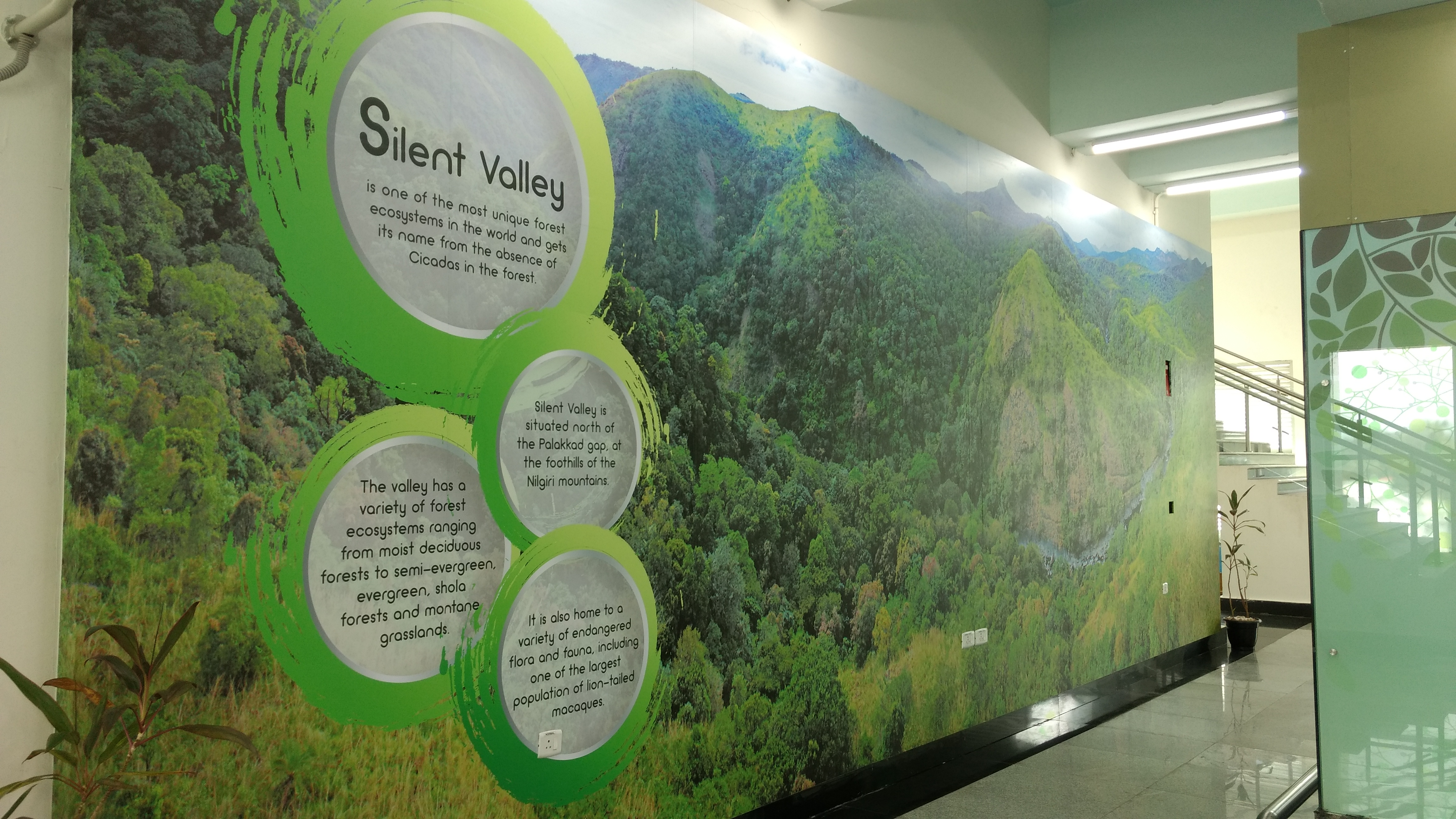
- Pulinchodu station

General information
- Coordinates: 10.095120°N 76.346661°E
- System: Kochi Metro rapid transit
- Platforms: 2

History
- Opened: 19 June 2017; 9 years ago

Services
Preceding station	Kochi Metro	Following station
Aluva Terminus	Line 1	Companypady towards Thrippunithura Terminal
Route map
Location
- Location within Kerala

Pulinchodu is a station of Kochi Metro. The station is located between Aluva and Companypady.

It was inaugurated by the Prime Minister of India Narendra Modi on 17 June and opened for public on 19 June 2017 as a part of the first stretch of the metro system, between Aluva and Palarivattom.
