= Pettah metro station =

Metro station in Kochi, India

Pettah

General information
- Coordinates: 9.951172°N 76.331043°E
- System: Kochi Metro rapid transit

History
- Opened: 7 September 2020; 5 years ago

Services
Preceding station	Kochi Metro	Following station
Thaikoodam towards Aluva	Line 1	Vadakkekotta towards Thrippunithura Terminal
Route map
Location
- Location within Kochi

Pettah metro station is a metro station of Kochi Metro. It was opened on 7 September 2020 as a part of the extension of the metro system from Thaikoodam to Pettah.

== Station layout ==
G	Street level	Exit/Entrance
L1	Mezzanine	Fare control, station agent, Metro Card vending machines, crossover
L2	Side platform | Doors will open on the left
L2	Platform 2 Southbound	Towards → Thrippunithura Terminal next station is Vadakkekotta
L2	Platform 1 Northbound	Towards ← Aluva next station is Thaikoodam
L2	Side platform | Doors will open on the left
L2
