= Aluva metro station =

Metro station in Kochi, India

Aluva

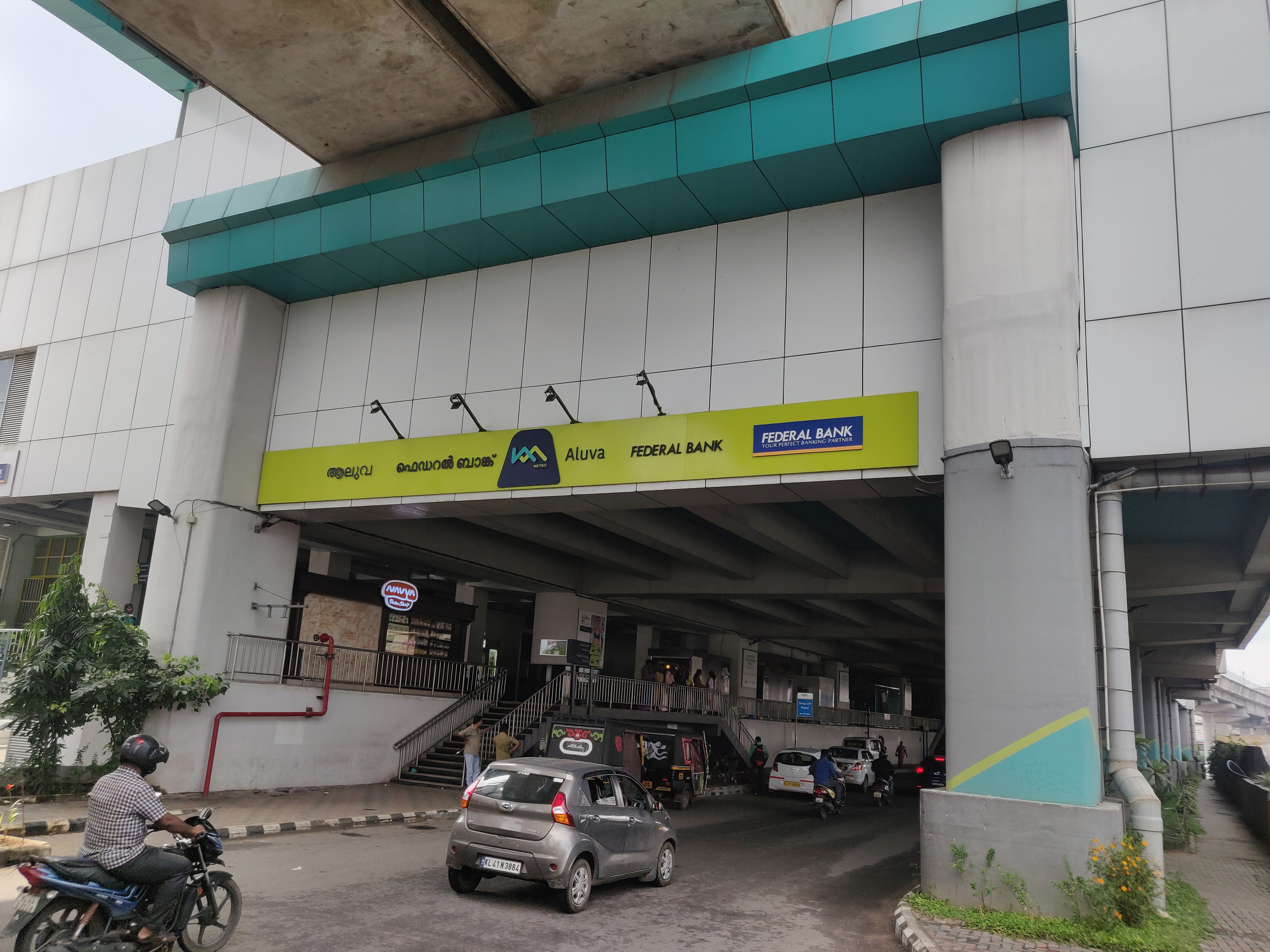
- Aluva Metro Station in 2019

General information
- Location: Aluva Bypass, Kochi
- Coordinates: 10.109675°N 76.349638°E
- System: Kochi Metro rapid transit
- Owner: KMRL
- Platforms: 2

Construction
- Parking: Available

History
- Opened: 19 June 2017; 9 years ago
- Electrified: 750V DC

Services
Preceding station	Kochi Metro	Following station
Terminus	Line 1	Pulinchodu towards Thrippunithura Terminal
Route map
Location
- Location within Kerala

Aluva is an elevated metro station serving as the northern terminal of the Kochi Metro. It is located besides the Aluva flyover near the Aluva market and the banks of the Periyar river. Spread over an area of 1.5 lakh square feet, it is Kochi Metro’s second biggest station after Vadakkekota. It was inaugurated by the Prime Minister of India Narendra Modi on 17 June and opened for public on 19 June 2017 as a part of the first stretch of the metro system, between Aluva and Palarivattom. Aluva Metro station has Periyar river as its theme. Along with images of rivers, the floors of the station are also designed to symbolize the river water resources.

== Location and connections ==
Aluva metro station is located on the side of the Aluva flyover along the National Highway 544 at Aluva Bypass Junction. Aluva private bus stand is located adjacent to the metro station and provides services to Perumbavoor, Angamaly, Mala, Paravoor, Kochi Airport, Kalady along with many other places. Additionally, buses stop at the entrance of the metro station to accommodate passengers. Aluva railway station and Aluva KSRTC bus station are situated 1.50 km away from the metro station. Long distance KSRTC buses have their stop in front of the metro station. There are also feeder bus services from the station to the airport.
