= Bandra Kurla Complex metro station =

Mumbai Metro Line 3's major underground metro station

Bandra–Kurla Complex

General information
- Other names: BKC metro station
- Location: F Block Bandra Kurla Complex, Sant Dnyaneshwar Nagar, Bandra East, Mumbai, Maharashtra 400051
- Coordinates: 19°03′38″N 72°51′17″E
- Owner: Mumbai Metro Rail Corporation Ltd.
- Line: Line 3
- Platforms: 2 island platforms
- Tracks: 3
- Connections: Line 2B at Income Tax Office (Under–construction); Bandra Kurla Complex HSR (Under–construction)

Construction
- Structure type: Underground
- Accessible: Yes

Other information
- Status: Staffed, Operational
- Station code: BDRM

History
- Opened: 5 October 2024; 23 months ago

Services
Preceding station	Mumbai Metro	Following station
Dharavi towards Cuffe Parade	Line 3	Bandra Colony towards Aarey JVLR
Route map
Aqua Line
Location

Bandra–Kurla Complex (officially known as Kotak Bandra–Kurla Complex) is an underground metro station serving the business district of Bandra Kurla Complex on the North-South corridor of the Aqua Line 3 of Mumbai Metro in Mumbai, India.

This metro station was inaugurated on October 5, 2024, by Prime Minister Narendra Modi, followed by the commencement of the metro service from October 7, 2024.

== Station layout ==
G	Street level	Exit/entrance
C	Concourse	Fare control, station agent, ticket/token, shops
P Platforms	Platform 3	Towards Aarey JVLR (Bandra Colony) →
P Platforms	Island platform
P Platforms	Platform 2B; Platform 2A	Towards Aarey JVLR (Bandra Colony) →
P Platforms	Island platform
P Platforms	Platform 1	← Towards Cuffe Parade (Dharavi)

== Entry/exit ==
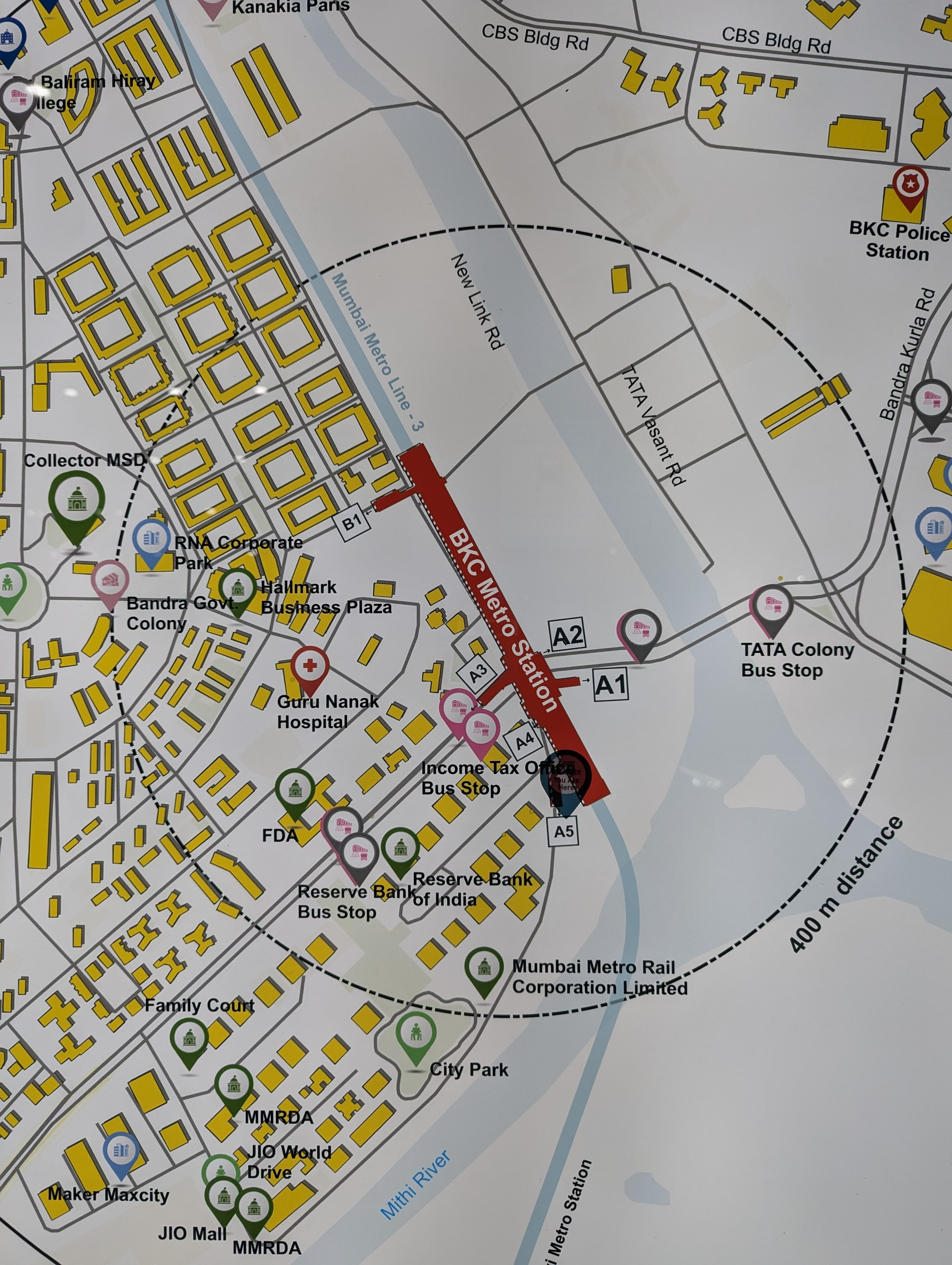
Mumbai Metro Line 3, Bandra Kurla Complex Station, schematic layout

- A1 – Bandra Kurla Complex 'E' Block, National Stock Exchange
- A2 – Bharat Nagar, Asian Heart Institute
- A3 – ITO Junction, Kala Nagar
- A4 – ITO Junction, Family Court
- A5 – Bandra Kurla Complex 'E' Block, Mumbai Metropolitan Region Development Authority
- B1 – Sant Dhyaneshwar Nagar, Office of District Collector, Mumbai Suburban
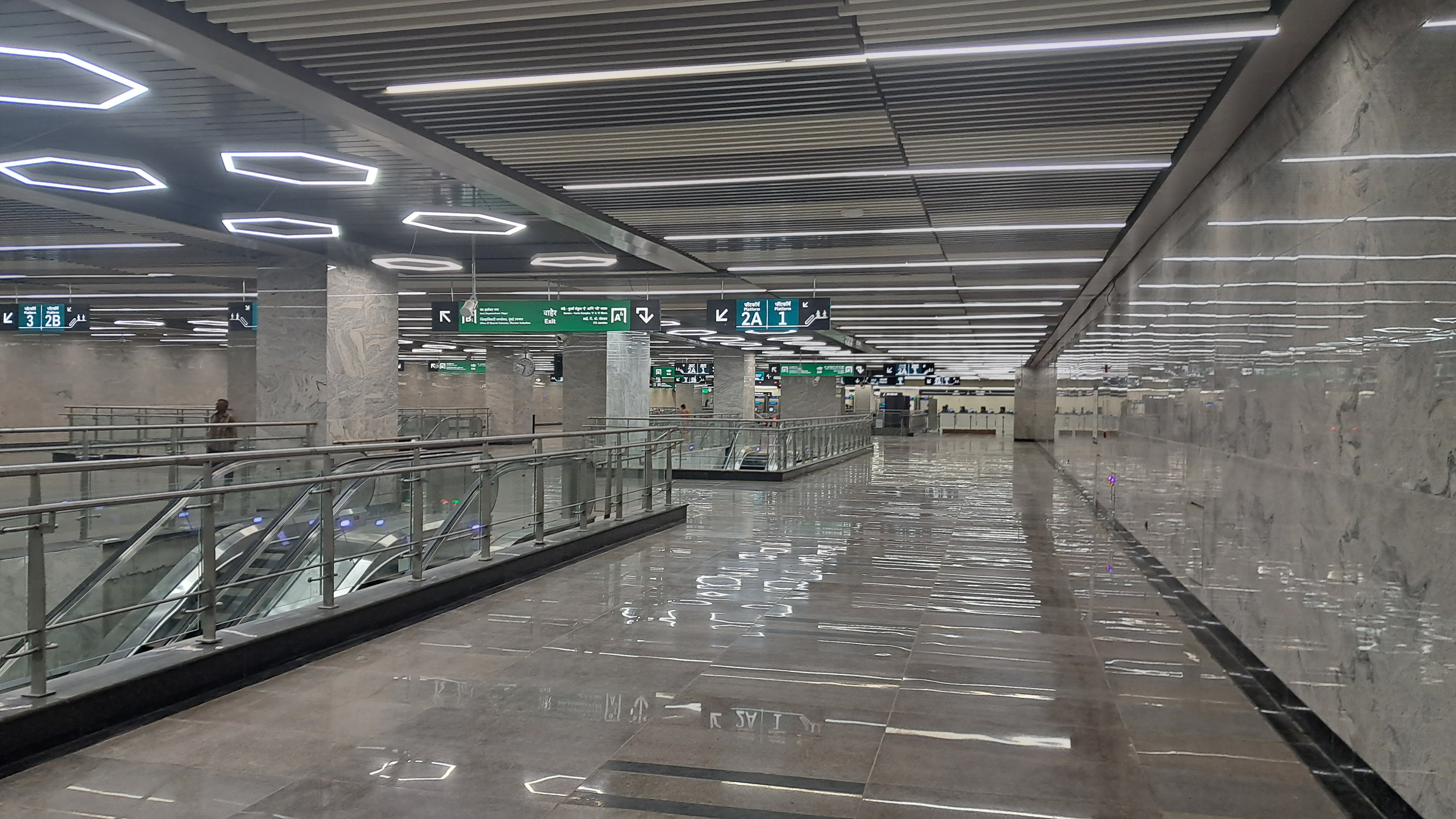
Concourse level of the Metro Station

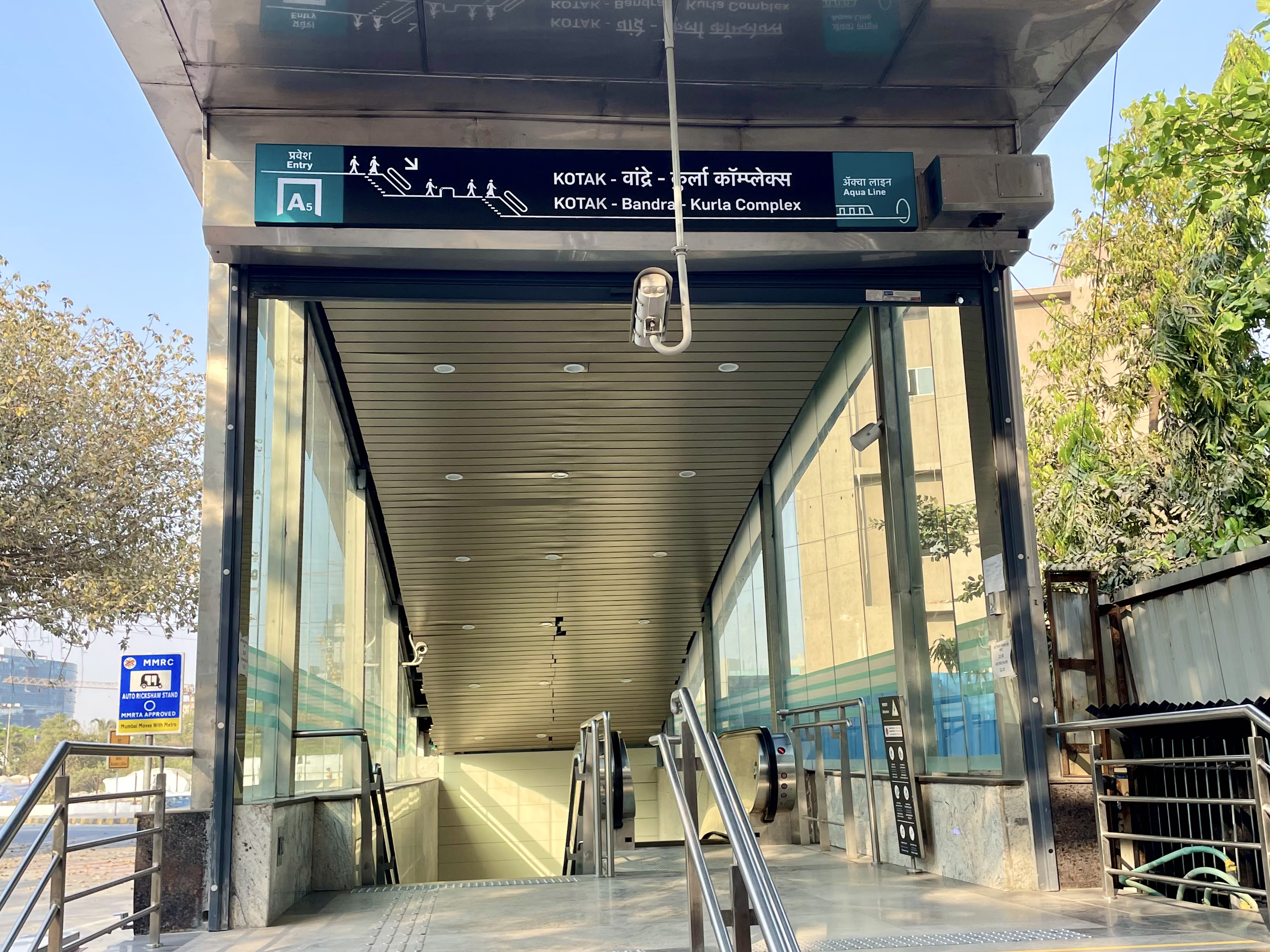
Exit A5

== Impact ==
The Bandra Kurla Complex metro station, as part of Mumbai Metro Aqua Line 3, has had a significant impact on the surrounding real estate markets. According to Fortune India, rents along the newly operational “BKC–Worli” corridor, rose by up to 2.37% within one month of opening—Mahim at 2.37%, Sion at 1.78%, Dadar at 1.47%, Worli at 1.32% and Prabhadevi at 1.06%. Rents in Santacruz increased by 2.15%, while BKC itself rose by 1.78% in the same period.

A Hindustan Times analysis highlights that connecting BKC and Worli, two of India’s most expensive real estate hubs, via Metro Aqua Line 3 (Phase 2) is expected to spur further growth in South and Central Mumbai property values. Per-square-foot apartment rates currently range from ₹45,000 to ₹160,000, driven by the metro connectivity and urban redevelopment expert opinion. The same report noted that while ultra-high-net-worth individuals may prefer the Coastal Road, the metro line will benefit middle-tier professionals and fuel redevelopment projects in areas such as Worli, Dadar, and Mahim.

Experts from Colliers India anticipate a 10–15% rise in both residential and commercial property values along the metro corridor over the next few years, including areas like Santacruz, Andheri East, Prabhadevi, Chembur, Kurla, and Dadar.

Commercial real estate analysts, including Knight Frank, expect increased leasing demand in older business districts like Nariman Point, with office space rentals potentially doubling by 2030, driven in part by Metro Line 3 and related transit infrastructure.

== See also ==
- Mumbai
- Transport in Mumbai
- List of Mumbai Metro stations
- List of rapid transit systems in India
- List of metro systems
