= Bandra Colony metro station =

Mumbai Metro's Aqua Line metro station

Bandra Colony
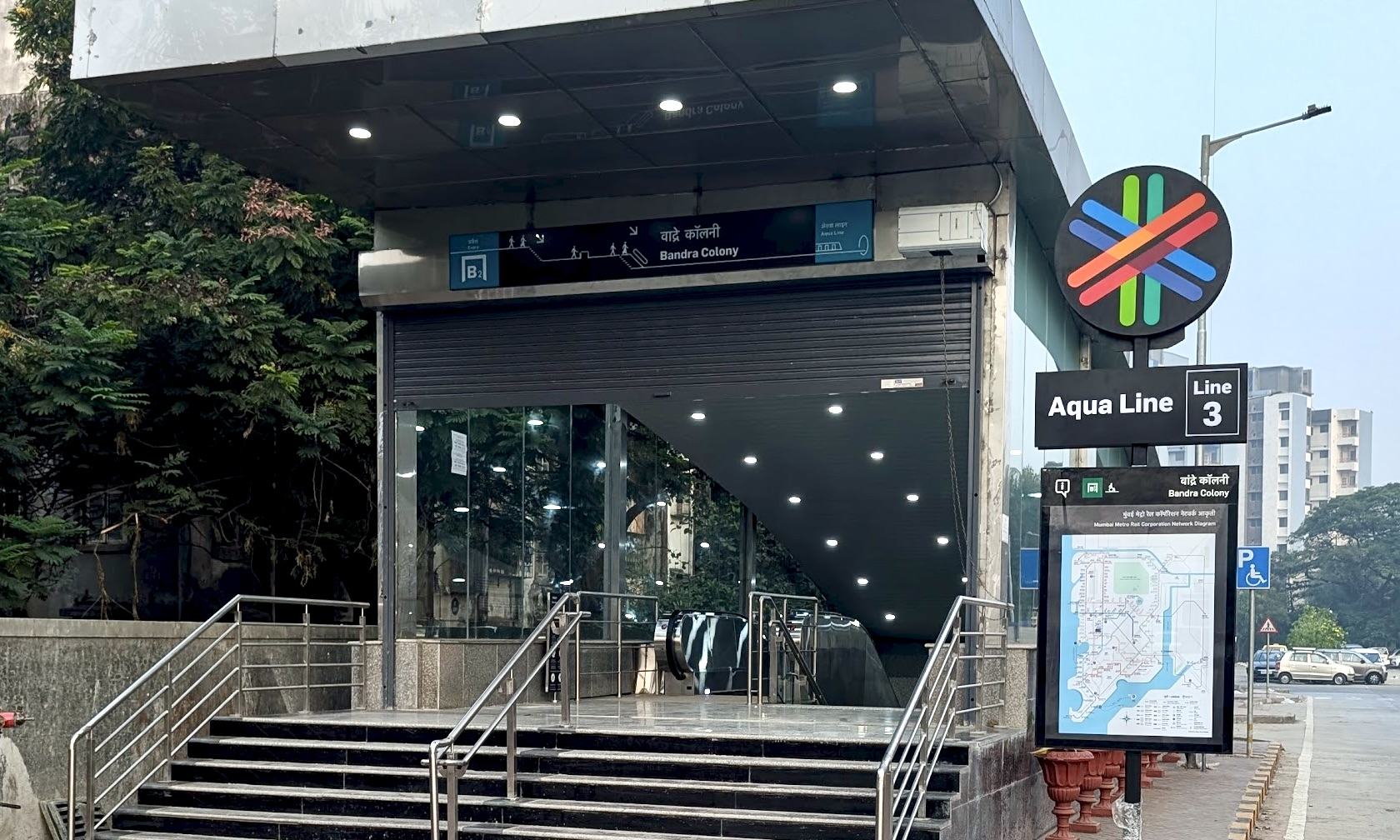
- Bandra Colony metro station entrance B2

General information
- Location: F Block, Bandra Kurla Complex, Bandra East, Mumbai, Maharashtra 400051
- Coordinates: 19°04′12″N 72°50′58″E
- Owner: Mumbai Metro Rail Corporation Ltd.
- Operator: Delhi Metro Rail Corporation
- Line: Line 3
- Platforms: 1 island platform

Construction
- Structure type: Underground
- Accessible: Yes

Other information
- Status: Staffed, operational
- Station code: VIDN

History
- Opened: 5 October 2024; 2 years ago
- Former names: Vidhyanagari

Services
| Preceding station | Mumbai Metro | Following station |
|---|---|---|
| Bandra Kurla Complex towards Cuffe Parade | Line 3 | Santacruz towards Aarey JVLR |
Track layout
Location

Bandra Colony is an underground metro station on the North-South corridor of the Aqua Line 3 of Mumbai Metro in Mumbai, India. It was opened to public on 7 October 2024.

== History ==
In 2024, the Mumbai Metro Rail Corporation renamed several stations along Metro Aqua Line 3 (Colaba–Bandra–SEEPZ) to better reflect the local geography and cultural context. As part of this initiative, the station initially named Vidyanagari was officially renamed to Bandra Colony. The change was approved by the Union Government ahead of the partial commencement of operations on the Aqua Line in October 2024. The renaming aimed to align station names with the surrounding localities and improve commuter clarity, especially in areas with overlapping transit infrastructure.

== Station layout ==
| G | Ground level | Exit/Entrance |
| L1 | Concourse | Customer Service, Shops, Vending machine, ATMs |
| L2; Platforms | Platform 2 | Towards Aarey JVLR (Santacruz) → |
| L2; Platforms | Island platform |
| L2; Platforms | Platform 1 | ← Towards Cuffe Parade (Bandra Kurla Complex) |

== Entry/exit ==
- A1 - Government Colony Bandra, I. E. S Junior College
- A2 - University of Mumbai (Kalina University), Ascend International School
- B1 - Western Express Highway, Teacher's Colony
- B2 - University of Mumbai (Kalina University), Uttar Bhartiya Sangh

== See also ==
- Mumbai
- Public transport in Mumbai
- List of Mumbai Metro stations
- List of rapid transit systems in India
- List of Metro Systems
