= Aqua Line (Mumbai Metro) =

Underground Line of the Mumbai Metro

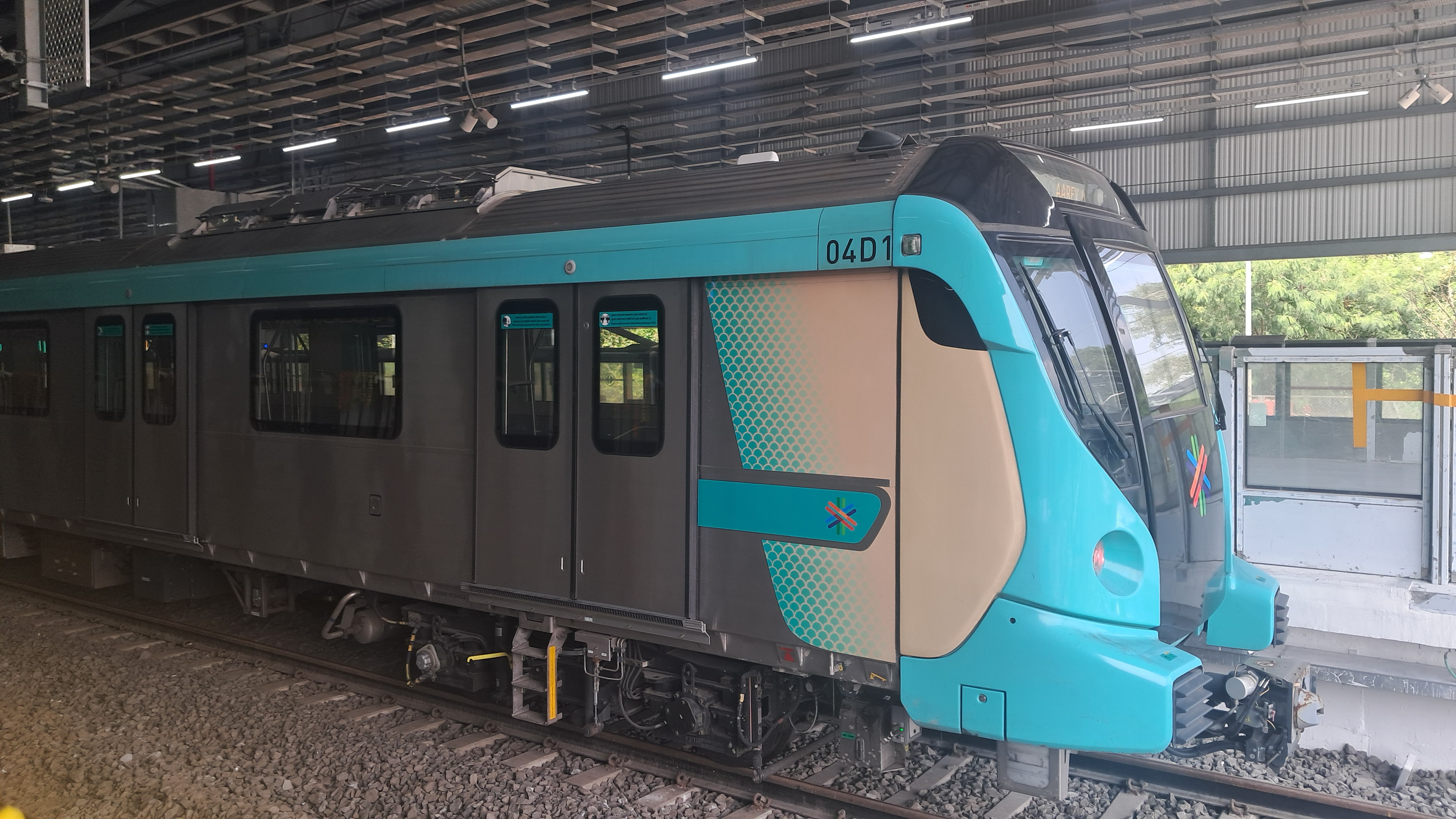
- An Aqua line Driverless Alstom Metropolis at Aarey JVLR metro station

Overview
- Other names: Line 3; Colaba–Bandra-SEEPZ line
- Status: Operational
- Owner: Mumbai Metro Rail Corporation Ltd. (MMRCL)
- Line number: 3
- Termini: Aarey JVLR; Cuffe Parade
- Connecting lines: Operational: Line 1; Under-construction: Line 2B; Line 6; Line 7A
- Stations: 27
- Website: mmrcl.com

Service
- Type: Rapid transit
- System: Mumbai Metro
- Operator: Delhi Metro Rail Corporation
- Depot: Aarey JVLR
- Rolling stock: Alstom Metropolis
- Daily ridership: 150,000 (October 2025)

History
- Opened: 5 October 2024; 2 years ago
- Last extension: 8 October 2025; 13 months ago

Technical
- Line length: 33.5 km (20.8 mi)
- Track length: 67.0 km (41.6 mi)
- Num of tracks: 2
- Character: Underground and at-grade
- Track gauge: 1,435 mm (4 ft 8 1/2 in) standard gauge
- Electrification: 25 kV 50 Hz AC (overhead line)
- Operating speed: 35 km/h (22 mph)
- Signalling: CBTC

The Aqua Line (Line 3) is a rapid transit metro line of the Mumbai Metro in the city of Mumbai, Maharashtra, India. The 33.5 km (20.82 mi) route is Mumbai's first underground metro line with 27 stations, 26 of which are underground stations and one at-grade. The line runs from Cuffe Parade in South Mumbai to Aarey JVLR in the north centre, and includes connections to other metro lines, monorail, suburban rail, inter-city rail, and Mumbai's International Airport. The Aqua Line is expected to reduce road congestion as well as the traffic load on the Western Line between Bandra and Churchgate.

The project was implemented and is currently operated by the Mumbai Metro Rail Corporation Limited (MMRCL). The total cost of this line is estimated at ₹30,000 crore (US$3.2 billion). The project was funded by five major groups: MMRCL, Padeco, MMRDA, and JICA; the last of which provided a soft loan of ₹13,235 crore (US$1.4 billion).

The section of the line between Bandra Kurla Complex and Dharavi stations includes a 170-metre (560 ft) long twin-tunnel passing under the Mithi River. This is the second under-river metro rail tunnel in India after the first tunnel underneath the Hooghly River on Kolkata Metro Green Line. The first phase of the project was inaugurated on 5 October 2024 by Prime Minister Narendra Modi. This consisted of the ₹14,120 crore BKC to Aarey Jogeshwari-Vikhroli Link Road section of the line, which has 10 stations. Phase 2A of the line stretching from BKC to Acharya Atre Chowk, covering an additional five stations, was inaugurated on 9 May 2025, by Chief Minister Devendra Fadnavis along with other officials. The final 2B phase of 10.99 km stretch of the line from Acharya Atre Chowk to Cuffe Parade was inaugurated by PM Modi, along with the Navi Mumbai International Airport on 8 October 2025.

The construction of this metro route faced hurdles from environmentalists and activists lodging numerous PILs over cutting of trees in various regions accompanied with a larger protest in Aarey over the carshed construction. PILs were either dismissed or did not succeed, as both the Bombay High Court and the Supreme Court of India cited the importance of the metro project. Initial projections for the Aqua Line anticipated daily ridership of nearly 1.5 million passengers; however, subsequent estimates indicate that actual usage at the moment has reached only about 150,000 passengers per day.

== Background ==
A 20 km (12.4 mi) metro line from Colaba to Bandra was announced in January 2004, as part of a master plan unveiled by the Mumbai Metropolitan Region Development Authority (MMRDA). The plan encompassed a total of 146 kilometres (90.7 mi) of track, of which 32 kilometres (19.9 mi) was proposed to be underground. The MMRDA unveiled plans for an extended Colaba-Bandra-SEEPZ metro line in 2011. According to its earlier plans, a 20 km (12.4 mi) metro line from Colaba to Bandra was to be constructed, running underground for 10 kilometres (6.2 mi) from Colaba to Mahalaxmi, and then on an elevated track from Mahalaxmi to Bandra. The MMRDA decided to extend the line to the Chhatrapati Shivaji Maharaj International Airport to increase ridership. The 33.5-kilometre (20.8 mi) Colaba-Bandra-SEEPZ line was estimated to cost ₹21,000 crore (US$2.2 billion), have 27 stations, and would be the city's first fully underground metro line. at Nariman Point, BKC, MIDC, SEEPZ, and elsewhere. According to the MMRDA, an underground metro will minimise land acquisition and disturbance to traffic during construction compared to an elevated metro.

The Mumbai Metro Rail Corporation Ltd (MMRC), registered under provisions of Company Act, 1956, was constituted as a fully owned company of the MMRDA on 30 April 2008, as per state government directives. On 27 February 2012, the Central Government gave in-principle approval to the plan for the Aqua Line. In April 2012, the MMRDA announced plans to grant the MMRC increased management autonomy, in an effort to enhance the project's operational efficiency.

== Funding ==
In early 2012, the MMRDA conducted talks with officials at Chhatrapati Shivaji International Airport (CSIA) to finance or construct the line's three stations at the airport and GVK SkyCity, a proposed nearby commercial development. Mumbai International Airport Limited (MIAL) agreed to bear the cost of constructing the three stations, which was expected to total ₹777 crore. MIAL was willing to contribute to the metro's construction because of the potential increase in passenger convenience. In 2014, MIAL estimated the cost of developing the metro lines in the airport as ₹518 crore. MIAL inserted a 'metro component' in the User Development Fee charged at Mumbai Airport from 2016 to February 2023 to raise this amount. The charges of Rs 20 and Rs 120 per domestic and international departure respectively, were levied until the target sum was raised.

In August 2012, the Urban Development Ministry rejected the Planning Commission's proposal to implement the Aqua Line in a public-private partnership (PPP) mode, having found the mode unsatisfactory for the Delhi Airport Metro Express. The ministry instead proposed a funding pattern with a ratio of 20:80 between the Centre and the State. Of the State equity, 45% was proposed to be through a loan from the Japan International Cooperation Agency (JICA).

In 2016, JICA commenced providing financial assistance for the project in the form of a soft loan through the MOUD (Ministry of urban development) as a "pass through assistance" at an annual rate of interest of 1.4% (interest free for monies given to consultants). This amounts to ₹13,235 crore (US$1.4 billion) for the ₹23,136 crore (US$2.5 billion) project. JICA will fund 57.2% of the equity. The soft loan has an interest rate of 1.44%. The other finance will come from the central and state equity of 10.4% each, sub-debt by the central government (4.4%), sub-debt by the state (7%), property development and impact fee (4.3%), stakeholder contribution from the Mumbai International Airport Ltd. (3.4%) and MMRDA grant/aside funding (2.9%).

In March 2019, the MMRC managing director Ashwini Bhide stated that the actual completion cost of the project was ₹30,000 crore (US$3.2 billion).

Aqua Line
Source	Amount	%
Equity by Central Government	₹3,566 crore (US$380 million)	9.57
Equity by State Government	₹3,566 crore (US$380 million)	9.57
Sub-debt by Central Government	₹1,571.50 crore (US$170 million)	4.22
Sub-debt by State Government	₹4,835.55 crore (US$520 million)	12.97
Property development + impact fee	₹1,000 crore (US$110 million)	2.68
Stakeholder contribution (MIAL)	₹777 crore (US$83 million)	2.08
ASIDE funding / MMRDA grant	₹679 crore (US$73 million)	1.82
JICA loan	₹21,280.45 crore (US$2.3 billion)	57.09
Total	₹37,276 crore (US$4.0 billion)	100

== Planning ==
The Union Cabinet granted clearance to the Aqua Line on 27 June 2013. The cabinet also decided to convert Mumbai Metro Rail Corporation (MMRC), the existing state-level special purpose vehicle formed to implement metro projects, into a joint venture company of the state and central governments with equity participation. The MMRC's board consists of five members each from state and central governments. The MMRDA presented their metro line plan to the Brihanmumbai Municipal Corporation on 13 February 2014.

Aqua Line was approved by the state cabinet on 26 February 2014. Aqua Line is being implemented through the engineering, procurement and construction (EPC) model. The foundation stone for the project was laid by Chief Minister Prithviraj Chavan in a bhoomi pujan ceremony at Andheri on 26 August 2014, in the presence of Union Urban Development minister Venkaiah Naidu. The move was described by the media as a cosmetic gesture, as the developers of the project had not yet been decided and actual construction was expected to begin only by December 2014. The date of the ceremony was a few days before the code of conduct for the 2014 State Assembly elections would come into force, which would prohibit the ruling Congress-NCP government from politicising the ceremony. Some citizens protested against the State government at the ground breaking site. They protested the slow implementation and cost escalation of the Mumbai Metro project. Tendering for the project was delayed by the re-organization of the MMRC from a wholly owned entity of the State Government, to a joint venture between the Union and State Governments. Although the State Government received the file for reconstituting the company in October 2013, it gave approval only in July 2014.

In December 2014, the MMRC appointed a consortium led by Hong Kong-based AECOM Asia, in a joint venture with Padeco, Japan, LBG Inc. USA and Egis Rail, France as the general consultants for the implementation of the Aqua Line project. The agreement between the two parties was signed on 26 May 2015. On 6 July 2015, the MMRC unveiled a new logo, designed by Design Orb, for the Aqua Line. UPS Madan, Director, MMRC and Metropolitan Commissioner, MMRDA, explained, "The earlier logo was designed with an elevated Metro-3 corridor in mind as was planned originally. The new logo presents the organisation more appropriately as its more relevant, fresh and robust". He also noted that the earlier logo had been designed while the MMRC was owned by the State Government, while it was now a joint venture between the State and the centre.

The MMRC had to rehabilitate 2,807 families for the project. Most of the families were relocated to Kurla and Chakala. The MMRC also provided free hotel accommodation to people residing in old, dilapidated buildings along the metro corridor that were in danger of collapsing during tunneling work. The majority of such buildings were located in the Girgaum-Kalbadevi belt in South Mumbai.

In March 2022, the Government of Maharashtra announced plans to extend the Aqua Line southbound from Cuffe Parade, adding one new station – Navy Nagar. The extension would be 2.5 km (1.6 mi) long, and would cost an additional ₹2,301 crore (US$250 million). In August 2022, the MMRCL invited bids for Detailed Project Reports (DPRs) for the extension.

=== Bidding ===
The MMRC called for pre-qualification bids in September 2013. Bidders for the work on tunnels and stations were to submit their bids by 30 October 2013. On 31 January 2014, the bid document was modified and the annual turnover requirement was reduced to "average annual construction turnover of not less than US$175 million defined as billing for civil infrastructure work completed or in progress over the last five years ending in March 2013". Sanjay Sethi, managing director of MMRC, stated, "The annual turnover requirement must have been set with the idea of attracting specific companies to the project. However, the Japan International Cooperation Agency (JICA) felt that consortia or joint ventures are a combination of management contractors and construction contractors. In all Metro projects, the annual turnover is the starting point for bidding based on which we should not restrict applications. The issue was also raised by several potential bidders." The last date for the submission of pre-qualification bids was extended to 10 March 2014. Fourteen pre-qualification bids were received for the design and construction of underground stations and tunnels for the Aqua Line. The 14 bidders were: Afcon-KMB, CEC-ITD Cementation India-TPL, CTCEC-Pan India Infrastructures Pvt Ltd, Dogus-Soma Constructions, IL&FS-CR256 (China Railway), JKumar-CRTG, Larsen & Toubro-STEC, Mosmetrostory-Hindustan Construction Company, OHL-SK Engineering & Construction, Pratibha-GDYT Consortium, Sacyr-CMC-Essar, Salin Impreglio-Gammon, Strabag-AG-Patel Engineering and Unity Infrastructure-IVRCL-CTG. Tenders to construct the car depot at Aarey colony were floated by the MMRC in July 2014.

Of the 14 consortia that submitted pre-qualification bids, nine were shortlisted in September 2014. According to Sanjay Sethi, managing director of MMRC, "We have finalised the list of companies eligible for bidding after getting an approval from the Japan International Cooperation Agency (JICA), which is providing more than 50 per cent of funds for the project. The companies that were declared ineligible mostly fell short in technical experience. The tender for construction of the Aqua Line received was split into seven packages, each consisting of a 4–5 km (2.5–3.1 mi) long twin tunnel. The tender floated by the MMRC received 31 bids from nine consortiums. The first four packages received 4 bids each, while the next three packages received five, seven and three bids respectively. The nine consortia were AFCONS Infrastructure Ltd. - Kyivmetrobud, Continental Engineering Corporation - ITD Cementation India Ltd - Tata Projects Ltd, DOGUS - SOMA, IL&FS Engineering and Construction Company Ltd - China Railway 25th Bureau Group Co.Ltd, J.Kumar Infraprojects Ltd - China Railway No.3 Engineering Group Co. Ltd, Larsen & Toubro Ltd/Shanghai Tunnel Engineering Co. Ltd, OSJC Moscow Metrostroy - Hindustan Construction Co.Ltd, Pratibha Industries Ltd - Guandong Yuantian Engineering Co., and Unity Infraprojects Ltd - IVRCL Ltd - China Railway Tunnel Group Co. Ltd.

Contracts for all seven packages were awarded by August 2016. Each package costs about ₹2,221 crore (US$240 million) and includes around 6.8 km (4.2 mi) twin tunnels and 5 stations.

In January 2017, the MMRC floated tenders worth ₹328 crore for the construction of the depot, a metro station, work workshop buildings at Aarey Colony and a vehicular underpass along the Marol Maroshi Road, with other allied works. The contract was awarded to New Delhi-based Sam (India) Builtwell Pvt. Ltd. in June 2017. The contract also includes the construction of about 2.5 km (1.6 mi) of storm water drains, a rain water harvesting system and the diversion of a 1,200 mm (47 in) diameter MCGM water pipeline. Construction is expected to be completed by mid-2020.

Aqua Line
Package	Contracts	Method	Cost	Contractors
1 (Cuffe Parade–Hutatma Chowk)	Cuffe Parade, Vidhan Bhavan, Churchgate	Cut-and-cover	₹2,988.53 crore (US$320 million)	Larsen & Toubro and Shanghai Tunnel Engineering Co.
1 (Cuffe Parade–Hutatma Chowk)	Hutatma Chowk	NATM	₹2,988.53 crore (US$320 million)	Larsen & Toubro and Shanghai Tunnel Engineering Co.
2 (CSMT Metro–Grant Road)	CSMT Metro	Cut-and-cover	₹2,521.89 crore (US$270 million)	Hindustan Construction Co and Moscow Metrostroy
2 (CSMT Metro–Grant Road)	Grant Road, Kalabadevi, Girgaon	NATM	₹2,521.89 crore (US$270 million)	Hindustan Construction Co and Moscow Metrostroy
3 (Mumbai Central–Worli)	Mumbai Central Metro, Mahalaxmi, Science Museum, Worli, Acharya Atre Chowk	C&C	₹2,557.84 crore (US$270 million)	Doğuş and Soma
4 (Siddhivinayak–Sitaladevi)	Siddhivinayak, Dadar	C&C	₹2,830.10 crore (US$300 million)	Continental Engineering Corp, ITD Cementation and Tata Projects
4 (Siddhivinayak–Sitaladevi)	Sitaladevi	NATM	₹2,830.10 crore (US$300 million)	Continental Engineering Corp, ITD Cementation and Tata Projects
5 (Dharavi–Santacruz)	Dharavi, BKC, Vidyanagari	C&C	₹2,817.02 crore (US$300 million)	J Kumar Infraprojects and China Railway Tunnel Group
5 (Dharavi–Santacruz)	Santacruz	NATM	₹2,817.02 crore (US$300 million)	J Kumar Infraprojects and China Railway Tunnel Group
6 (CSIA–CSA International)	Domestic Airport, Sahar Airport, International Airport	C&C	₹2,118.40 crore (US$230 million)	J Kumar Infraprojects and China Railway Tunnel Group
7 (Marol Naka–SEEPZ)	Marol Naka	NATM	₹2,281.45 crore (US$240 million)	Larsen & Toubro and Shanghai Tunnel Engineering Co.
7 (Marol Naka–SEEPZ)	MIDC, SEEPZ	C&C	₹2,281.45 crore (US$240 million)	Larsen & Toubro and Shanghai Tunnel Engineering Co.
Aarey Colony	Aarey Depot	At grade	₹328 crore (US$35 million)	Sam (India) Builtwell Pvt. Ltd.

== Environmental damage and safety issues ==
=== Green cover loss and harm to biodiversity ===
The project will affect 5,012 trees, of which 1,331 will be cut and the remaining 3,681 will re-planted in other parts of the city. Per the terms of the contracts awarded to various consortia, they are in-charge of transplanting affected trees and planting new trees to make up for those cut down. The contract requires consortia to plant three times the number of trees cut down for the project, and maintain them for a period of at least three years. The consortium of Tata Projects, ITD Cementation and CEC Taiwan, which won the contract to construct package 4, pledged to construct four times more trees than it was required to plant under the contract. The work on package 4, the section between Siddhivinayak Temple and Mahim, required the felling of 150 trees. The consortium pledged that it would plant 2,000 trees instead of the required 450.

On 28 February 2017, the MMRC announced that it would donate 25,000 saplings to housing societies, hospitals, and schools located along the metro line. The MMRC stated that the donation was in addition to compulsory tree plantation required by MCGM regulations. In January 2017, the MMRC hired arborist Simon Leong from Singapore to serve as a tree consultant on the project. Leong will provide his services for a six-month period at a rate of $33,000 per month. The MMRC donated 16,000 saplings at 25 different locations under its Project Neighbourhood initiative on 11 April 2017.

MMRC Director Ashwini Bhide criticized the controversy over the tree felling required for the project saying that infrastructure could not be built without cutting down trees. Bhide stated that the metro had been designed to minimize the loss of trees, and that 3 times more trees would be planted to make up for the loss. Bhide further explained that the 5,000 trees proposed to be cut for Metro 3 would reduce carbon dioxide by 6,100 kg, while reduction in vehicle usage as a result of Metro 3 would reduce carbon emissions by an estimated 9.9 million kg. Bhide also stated that the MMRC had considered building the depot at Kalina and Kanjurmarg but decided against it due to lack of availability of land and potential legal disputes involving land in the area.

On 4 October 2019 after Bombay High Court dismissed the petitions rejecting application for stay on tree cutting at Aarey in the morning.

=== Threat of flooding ===
A technical expert committee appointed by the state had reported in May 2015 that if the car shed is built and the land in Aarey is concretised, the excess water during rains will run off into Mithi and flood the Airport and Chakala area since Aarey acts as a catchment area for the Mithi river. The experts, Dr Rakesh Kumar, director, National Environmental Engineering Institute (NEERI) and Dr. Shyam Asolekar, Professor at IIT-Bombay prepared a note on the same and submitted it to the Tree Authority before their meeting to take decision to give permission for felling of trees in September 2019. On 26 May 2025, just days after the line's opening, the Acharya Atre Chowk station platform was flooded due to heavy rains.

=== Safety issues due to construction ===
In September 2019, one man died and one injured in an accident in the tunnel shaft. This occurred between the SEEPZ station and the ramp near Aarey Forest (Prajapurpada & Sariput Nagar area).

In November 2019, a building (Laxmi Niwas) near the Sitladevi station, sank at least 6mm due to piling and soil excavation work. 25 families had to be evacuated and shifted to temporary shelters in hotels. Residents have suffered and have complained about the cracks that developed due to the construction work. Within one week of this incident, another building, Meher Manzil on LJ road in Mahim, also sank. Sea water has entered the foundation and corroded the pillars. Cracks had developed long before but the sinking of the foundation itself scared the residents and they moved out due to fear.

The 120 year old, grade-I heritage structure that serves as the Western Railway Headquarter was reported to be under threat in December 2019 from the regular underground blasts at the Oval Maidan site of the metro. The employees have complained that the frequency of the blasts have increased and the building shakes like a mini earthquake. Architects expressed concern over safety measures and precautions taken by MMRCL.

== Legal Issues ==
=== Tree conservation ===
On 9 February 2017, the Bombay High Court issued an interim order prohibiting the MMRDA from cutting trees for the project. The Court was hearing two PILs filed by Mina Verma and Pravin Jehangir. Verma's PIL concerned tree felling in Churchgate, Colaba and Cuffe Parade, and Jehangir challenged the use of public lands for construction of the line. On 10 March 2017, the Court ordered the MMRC to furnish documents proving that it had received necessary clearance from the MoEF to construct the proposed stations of Hutatma Chowk, Churchgate and Cuffe Parade, or documents to prove that no clearances were required. The order was in response to the petitioner's claim that the MoEF had rejected the MMRC's request to construct the three stations. The MMRC responded that no clearance was required to construct the stations. On 16 March, the Court issued a notice to the MoEF asking it to clarify whether it had granted clearance to the MMRC to construct nine stations. The petitioner had pointed out that all nine stations fell under the Coastal Regulatory Zones II and III. On 12 April, the MMRDA filed its reply to petition declaring that the State Environment Impact Assessment Authority (SIEAA) had granted it permission to construct stations in Coastal Regulation Zone (CRZ) areas. The court directed the MMRDA and MMRC to submit all relevant supporting documents by 24 April. On 3 May, the Bombay High Court declared that the metro was crucial to ease traffic congestion in Mumbai. However, the court reserved its stay on tree felling stating that it would consider "what is more important - life of a human being or the life of tree". On 5 May, the High Court vacated its stay on tree felling for Metro 3. The Court declared that Metro 3 would help improve the environment and the socio-economic conditions of the city. It also observed that a balance had to be found between environmental protection and development, and that taking a "harsh stand, which the petitioners want" would make it "impossible to conduct development work".

On 8 May, the petitioners filed a special leave petition (SLP) in the Supreme Court challenging the High Court ruling. On 15 May 2017, the Supreme Court issued a stay on tree felling for the project until 18 May.

=== Aarey land issue ===
In 2015, the state government announced plans to construct the metro depot, where metro coaches will be parked, on an 81-acre plot of land in Aarey Colony. Authorities also intended to construct a labour camp for construction workers and a centralised operation control centre for the entire Mumbai Metro network at Aarey Colony. The construction would require the felling of more than 2,000 trees in the area. Environmental groups Vanashakti and Aarey Conservation Group (ACG) filed a petition with the National Green Tribunal (NGT) in January 2015 requesting that the Aarey Colony be protected as a no-development zone. On 5 December 2016, the Union Environment Ministry issued a notification declaring the area up to 4 km from the boundary of the Sanjay Gandhi National Park to be an eco-sensitive zone. The notification excluded 165 hectares of land in Aarey, in order to permit the construction of the Aqua Line. However, the notification declared that the exclusion was sub-ordinate to any orders from the judiciary or the NGT.

The NGT's Pune bench passed an order temporarily staying all construction activities in Aarey on 19 December 2016. On 5 January 2017, the NGT granted an exemption permitting the MMRC to construct a casting yard on a 3-hectare plot of land owned by the State Government in Aarey. A tribunal bench ordered the forest department to provide a detailed map of Aarey Colony, and to declare whether any portion of the region had been identified as forests. In 1997, as part of a Supreme Court directive, State Governments had prepared a detailed map of urban forest cover. The forest department failed to provide the details at the next hearing, and on 17 February 2017, the NGT extended its stay on all construction activities up to 17 March 2017. On 29 March, the state forest department informed the NGT that 1,279.74 ha of land at Aarey had been used for non-forest activities since 1949, and therefore "cannot be declared a forest land because it is not a forest". The department clarified that although 1,114.74 ha of land had been declared as an eco-sensitive zone (ESZ) by the Union environment ministry on 5 December 2016, the notification excluded the land given to the MMRC and certain other areas. The department also stated that it would submit a list of survey numbers identifying Aarey as a non-forest area at the NGT's next hearing on 10 April. At the hearing on 10 April, the forest department stated that it was unable to locate its report on Aarey that would help prove that it was not "forest land", and requested an extension. The request was denied by the NGT. On 24 April, the Tribunal ordered the additional solicitor general to appear before it on 3 May and clarify the MoEF's position on approval for Metro 3.

Due to the issues surrounding the land at Aarey, Larsen & Toubro and Shanghai Tunnel Engineering Co., the consortium that was awarded the seventh package to carry out construction on the MIDC-Aarey Depot section of the line, exited the contract. The MMRC stated that the appointment of a new contractor would escalate the project cost by an addition ₹10 crore (US$1.1 million). The Court stated that it would determine if the cutting of nearly 5,000 trees for the project was necessary.

On 18 February 2017, Fadnavis directed the MMRDA to consider constructing the depot at Kanjurmarg or Kalina. A few weeks later, MMRC officials stated that the proposed depot could not be built at Mumbai University land in Kalina because the available area was too small. The MMRC insisted that the depot should be built at Aarey, but proposed a new design which would allow the depot to be construct on 25 hectares of land as compared to the 33 hectares required by the old design. The new design will reduce the number of trees to be cut by 1,000.

In March 2017, E. Sreedharan wrote to Chief Minister Fadnavis requesting him to ensure clearance for proposed metro depot at Aarey. Sreedharan wrote, "Metro projects are environmentally most friendly and setting up a carshed in Aarey is not going to be a threat either to the government or to the eco system. The main objection would be against cutting of trees, for which compensatory afforestation on a liberal scale can be insisted upon."

According reports in the media, the MMRC brought machinery to conduct soil testing work for constructing ramps in Aarey on 23 March. However, local business owners protested the work, alleging that the NGT had stayed all construction activities in Aarey. The MMRC stated that the stay only applied to construction of the car depot, and not the ramps. Due to the protests, contractors removed all machinery from the site on 25 March 2017. MMRC began soil testing at Aarey on 30 March 2017, under police protection. The work area was cordoned off and surrounded by 50 Mumbai Police personnel.

On 16 April 2019, the Supreme Court rejected a petition filed the Aarey Conservation Group, a non-government organisation, seeking an alternative site to construct the depot. The Court observed that the MMRC had already considered alternate options and deemed them unviable. A separate petition filed by the same NGO, which had been dismissed by the Bombay High Court in October 2018, is still pending before the Supreme Court. On 4 October 2019, Bombay High Court dismissed the petitions rejecting application for stay on tree cutting at Aarey in the morning. On 7 October 2019, the Supreme Court stayed the tree cutting and ordered to maintain status quo until further notice. On 29 November 2019 a day after Uddhav Thackeray became Chief Minister of Maharashtra, he put a stay on car shed work. Uddhav Thackeray then on 11 December 2019 appointed a committee to explore an alternative location for the shed. On 29 January 2020, the committee after studying suggested to lift the stay as they found no viable alternatives for car shed saying that MMRCL's arguments were valid.

In July 2022, when the new government came under the leadership of Eknath Shinde - Devendra Fadnavis the carshed was shifted back to Aarey as 25% work was already completed and Kanjurmarg was found not viable as it was very far from the metro line which could have led to higher cost and energy and also the ownership of the Kanjurmarg plot also led to disputes. Finally, on 21 July the stay order for the construction was retracted by the government and the construction resumed. This delay and other issues like the COVID-19 pandemic resulted in high cost overruns in thousands of crores in rupees and also delayed the opening of the line by at least 2 years.

== Construction ==
=== Agencies involved ===
Construction of the Colaba-Bandra-Seepz metro involves a number of large national and supra national entities and subcontractors. These subcontractors, mostly involved in the tunneling works and mostly joint ventures include L&T-STEC (a joint venture between Larsen & Toubro India and STEC a large Chinese infrastructure company based in Shanghai), CEC-ITD CEM-TPL, Dogus-Soma, HCC-MMS and J.Kumar-CRTG. More than 100 subcontractors and third parties have been used for various construction and relocation works including tunneling, boring, diversion of pipelines, realty consultancy and land acquisition.

=== Tunnels ===
Two 5.85 metre diameter twin tunnels of 33.5 km each were dug at a depth of 20–25 metres. Seventeen tunnel boring machines (TBMs), each weighing around 1400 tonnes and costing ₹120 crore (US$13 million), were used to dig tunnels and record 41 breakthroughs. The TBMs were lowered through shafts or pits using a specialized crane. Pre-cast segments were put on the tunnels' diameter to prevent cave ins, after the TBMs bore 1.2 metres. Tunnels would have to be dug through a mix of soil and basalt rock, and was expected to be difficult. After TBMs bore through a section, the metro tunnel will be lined with pre-cast concrete rings to strengthen the tunnels. Boring and placing rings occurs sequentially. For the entire Metro 3 corridor, around 40,000 concrete rings were cast in 65 moulds. Casting of the rings took place at six casting yards - four in Wadala, one each at Darga, and on the Jogeshwari-Vikhroli Link Road (JVLR). The first concrete ring was fabricated at a Wadala casting yard on 7 March 2017.

Underground construction was carried out at an average depth of 15 to 25 meters. The Hutatma Chowk, Kalbadevi, Girgaum, Grant Road, Shitladevi, Santacruz and Marol Naka stations were constructed by the New Austrian Tunnelling method, while the other 20 stations were constructed by the cut-and-cover method. In the latter method, the ground is dug, the entire station constructed, and finally the top is covered. Underground utilities were shifted to construct the line, as it is completely underground.

The section of the line between Bandra Kurla Complex and Dharavi stations includes a 170 metre long tunnel passing under the Mithi river. The underwater tunnel is located at a depth of 15–20 metres beneath the river bed. A stabling line, at a depth of 12–13 meters below the river bed was also constructed. The stabling line extends up to BKC station, and will be used for stabling and reversing of trains.

Construction work on the project began on 21 October 2016. The work faced delays due to several legal disputes. In March 2017, MMRC officials stated that they were unable to proceed with full scale construction activities due to legal issues, and that contractors were currently carrying out other activities such as shifting utilities, geo-technical surveys, and fabricating pre-cast segments. Officials further added that if construction did not begin within one month, the project cost would escalate at the rate ₹4 crore (US$430,000) per day and would result in higher passenger fares. Authorities began full scale construction activities on 18 May 2017.

The alignment of Metro 3 at Chira Bazar in Marine Lines runs parallel to a Parsi fire temple. The trust that manages the temple forbids the entry of non-Parsis into the temple. As a result, contractors were unable to the enter the temple premises to map the location and conduct a building condition survey before beginning construction of the line. The trust instead requested the MMRC to hire a Parsi engineer to carry out the necessary work in the temple premises. The MMRC officials accepted the request and stated that it would work with temple authorities to avoid offending any religious beliefs and sentiments. However, with only about 57,000 Parsis residing in Mumbai, the agency faced difficulty completing the task.

Tunneling work on the corridor was expected to begin by October 2017. An estimated 6 million cubic metres of rubble was to be excavated during tunneling, which would be sent to quarries on the outskirts of Mumbai. The rubble included basalt rock of good quality that could be re-used in construction. Initial plans called for the rubble to be used for the foundation of the Shiv Smarak monument, and the proposed Mumbai coastal road project, but delays associated with the monument made this unlikely.

On 10 July 2018, the MMRDA announced that it had completed 5,100 metres of tunneling for the corridor within the first year since the project was initiated. Around 10 km of tunneling was completed by September 2018, and 20 km by February 2019. The MMRCL reported that 23.9 km of the 52 km tunnelling work had been completed by the end of March 2019, or about 45% of total tunnelling work. As of 17 December 2020, 91% of total tunneling work is complete.

On 19 March 2020, MMRCL announced that it has achieved its 27th breakthrough out of the planned 41 breakthroughs. The section between BKC and Dharavi also marked the First underwater tunnel across the Mithi River. Pending tunneling across the Mithi river between Dharavi and BKC was completed on 19 August 2020, marking 29th such breakthrough.

On 16 August 2019, Chief Minister Fadnavis revealed the model for the rolling stock for the Aqua Line and announced that the line would be called the Aqua Line as the exterior and interior of the train feature an aqua colour scheme. The first trial run of the metro line was flagged off Maharashtra Chief Minister Eknath Shinde and Deputy Chief Minister Devendra Fadnavis on the 3 km stretch between Sariput Nagar in Aarey Colony and Marol Naka stations on 30 August 2022.

== Stations and interchange connections ==
There are 27 stations on the Aqua Line. Only the northern terminus, Aarey Depot, is at grade. All the other 26 stations are underground. Stations are equipped with platform screen doors.

Under the original plan, there was to be no direct connectivity between the airport and the metro. Commuters would have been required to exit the underground stations, return to ground level and cross a road to reach the airport. Upon reviewing the plan, Chief Minister Fadnavis directed the MMRC to redesign the stations to provide direct access between the underground and the airport as well as the Mumbai Central railway station.

=== Interchanges ===
Passenger interchange facilities, connecting to other railway lines, is provided at the following stations:

- Churchgate (connects to the Western suburban line towards Virar and beyond)
- Grant Road (connects to Western suburban line towards Dahanu Road)
- Mumbai Central (connects to two lines: the Western suburban line towards Dahanu Road; also to the Main line Western Railway for long-distance trains for travel to cities across India)
- Mahalaxmi (connects to two lines: the Western suburban line and the Mumbai Monorail)
- Mumbai CSMT (connects to three lines: the Central suburban line towards Kasara and Khopoli via Kalyan Junction; the Harbour suburban line towards Panvel via Vashi; and to Main line CR for long-distance trains, because this is a major terminus for trains going to other cities across India)
- Marol Naka (connects to Line-1 of Mumbai Metro which runs between Ghatkopar and Versova)
- Santacruz (connects to Santacruz railway station through skywalk; which connects Western suburban line)
- Bandra Kurla Complex (connects to Line-2 of Mumbai Metro which runs between Dahisar and Mankhurd via this station and the upcoming BKC teminal station of Mumbai–Ahmedabad high-speed rail corridor)

=== List of stations ===
Aqua Line (Line 3)
#	Station		Interchange	Opened	Alignment
#	English	Marathi	Interchange	Opened	Alignment
1	Aarey JVLR	आरे जे.व्ही.एल.आर.	Line 6 SEEPZ Village (under construction)	7 October 2024	At-grade
2	SEEPZ	सीप्झ		7 October 2024	Underground
3	MIDC – Andheri	एम.आय.डी.सी. – अंधेरी		7 October 2024	Underground
4	Marol Naka	मरोळ नाका	Line 1	7 October 2024	Underground
5	Chhatrapati Shivaji Maharaj International Airport - T2	छत्रपती शिवाजी महाराज आंतरराष्ट्रीय विमानतळ - T2	Line 7A (under construction); Line 8 (proposed) CSMIA (T-2)	7 October 2024	Underground
6	Sahar Road	सहार रोड		7 October 2024	Underground
7	Chhatrapati Shivaji Maharaj International Airport - T1	छत्रपती शिवाजी महाराज आंतरराष्ट्रीय विमानतळ - T1	CSMIA (T-1)	7 October 2024	Underground
8	Santacruz	सांताक्रुझ	Western Harbour	7 October 2024	Underground
9	Bandra Colony	वांद्रे कॉलनी		7 October 2024	Underground
10	Bandra Kurla Complex	वांद्रे कुर्ला कॉम्प्लेक्स	Line 2B Income Tax Office (under construction) Bandra Kurla Complex HSR (under construction)	7 October 2024	Underground
11	Dharavi	धारावी		10 May 2025	Underground
12	Shitaladevi Mandir	शितलादेवी मंदिर		10 May 2025	Underground
13	Dadar	दादर	Western Central; Indian Railways long-distance train terminus	10 May 2025	Underground
14	Siddhivinayak	सिद्धिविनायक		10 May 2025	Underground
15	Worli	वरळी		10 May 2025	Underground
16	Acharya Atre Chowk	आचार्य अत्रे चौक		10 May 2025	Underground
17	Science Centre	विज्ञान केंद्र		9 October 2025	Underground
18	Mahalaxmi	महालक्ष्मी	Western; Sant Gadge Maharaj Chowk	9 October 2025	Underground
19	Jagannath Shankar Sheth	जगन्नाथ शंकरशेठ	Western; Indian Railways long-distance train terminus (Mumbai Central)	9 October 2025	Underground
20	Grant Road	ग्रँट रोड	Western	9 October 2025	Underground
21	Girgaon	गिरगाव		9 October 2025	Underground
22	Kalbadevi	काळबादेवी		9 October 2025	Underground
23	Chhatrapati Shivaji Maharaj Terminus	छत्रपती शिवाजी महाराज टर्मिनस	Line 11 (proposed); Central Harbour; Indian Railways long-distance train terminus	9 October 2025	Underground
24	Hutatma Chowk	हुतात्मा चौक		9 October 2025	Underground
25	Churchgate	चर्चगेट	Western	9 October 2025	Underground
26	Vidhan Bhavan	विधान भवन		9 October 2025	Underground
27	Cuffe Parade	कफ परेड		9 October 2025	Underground

== Infrastructure ==
The car shed, where the metro rakes will be parked, is located opposite SEEPZ on a 33 hectare (81-acre plot) in Aarey Colony. In March 2017, the MMRC floated tenders for multiple works on Metro 3 including the traction system, power supply, tunnel ventilation, signalling, train control, platform screen doors and telecommunication system. The contracts include the manufacturing, supply and installation of these systems.

Tenders for design, supply, installation, testing and commissioning of ballastless tracks for the underground section were floated by the MMRC in May 2017.

=== Rolling stock ===
The MMRC, a joint venture of the Government of India and the Government of Maharashtra invited bids to supply rolling stock for Metro 3 in December 2015. The process of procuring rolling stock was delayed due to a disagreement between the Central Government and JICA. The Centre wanted 75% of the total rolling stock procured for the line to be manufactured in India, as part of its Make in India program, even if the contract was awarded to a foreign company. However, JICA wanted the bid for rolling stock to have no restrictions. The MMRC argued that manufacturing rolling stock in India would reduce the cost of maintenance. The agency stated that although bids without restrictions would result in cheaper procurement cost for the rolling stock, the subsequent cost of importing spare parts would be expensive. Under pressure from the NITI Aayog, the Department of Economic Affairs, and the Ministry of Urban Development, JICA agreed to accept the Union Government's domestic manufacturing requirement for rolling stock for all JICA-funded metro systems in India. As a result, the winning bidder may only manufacture a maximum 25% metro cars required for Metro 3 outside India. The MMRC rejected criticism that the restrictions would favour BEML, Bombardier and Alstom, the only companies that manufacture rolling stock in India, by stating that a foreign company that won the bid could sub-contract to an India-based manufacturer.

The MMRC restarted the bidding process, under the new conditions, in May 2017. The agency sought to procure 31 eight-car train sets. Each coach is 22.6 metres long and 3.2 metres wide. The MMRC received pre-qualification bids from seven firms - Alstom Transport India Ltd India & Alstom Transport S.A France (Consortium), CAF S.A, Spain, CRRC Nanjing, CRRC Changchun & CRRC International Corporation Ltd China (Consortium), Hitachi Ltd (Japan), Kawasaki Heavy Industries Japan & BHEL (Consortium) India, and Mitsubishi Corporation, Japan.

In September 2018, the MMRC awarded a EUR 315 million contract to French transportation major Alstom and its Indian subsidiary to supply 336 coaches for Metro 3. The contractor will be responsible for the design, manufacture, supply, installation, testing and commissioning of 42 driverless train sets of eight cars each. The trains will have a carrying capacity of 3,000 passengers and a seating capacity of around 300 passengers in each coach in longitudinal seating arrangements. All coaches will be designed and developed at Alstom's engineering centre in Bengaluru, and manufactured by the company's plant in Sri City, Andhra Pradesh.

Metro 3 will be driverless. The line has an automation level of grade 4. However, the line will employ drivers during its first year in operation. Trains on the line will also utilize a time-interval system which allows them to maintain the minimum possible distance required for safety between each other. As all trains are connected with the operation control centre, every train is aware of the speed and distance of all other trains.

=== Signalling ===
Metro 3 will utilise the Alstom Urbalis 400 communications-based train control (CBTC) signalling system. There are no signals on the line, and speed and distance between the trains is monitored by onboard computers that are connected with a central computer in the operations control centre.

=== Power ===
MMRDA joint project director Dilip Kawathkar stated that AC power was chosen for the Aqua Line "after a proper study by a team of experts" which found that the AC model was "a better option". Experts believe that the decision to use AC escalated the project cost by 15%, since more digging is required for the rail to work on AC.

== Operations ==
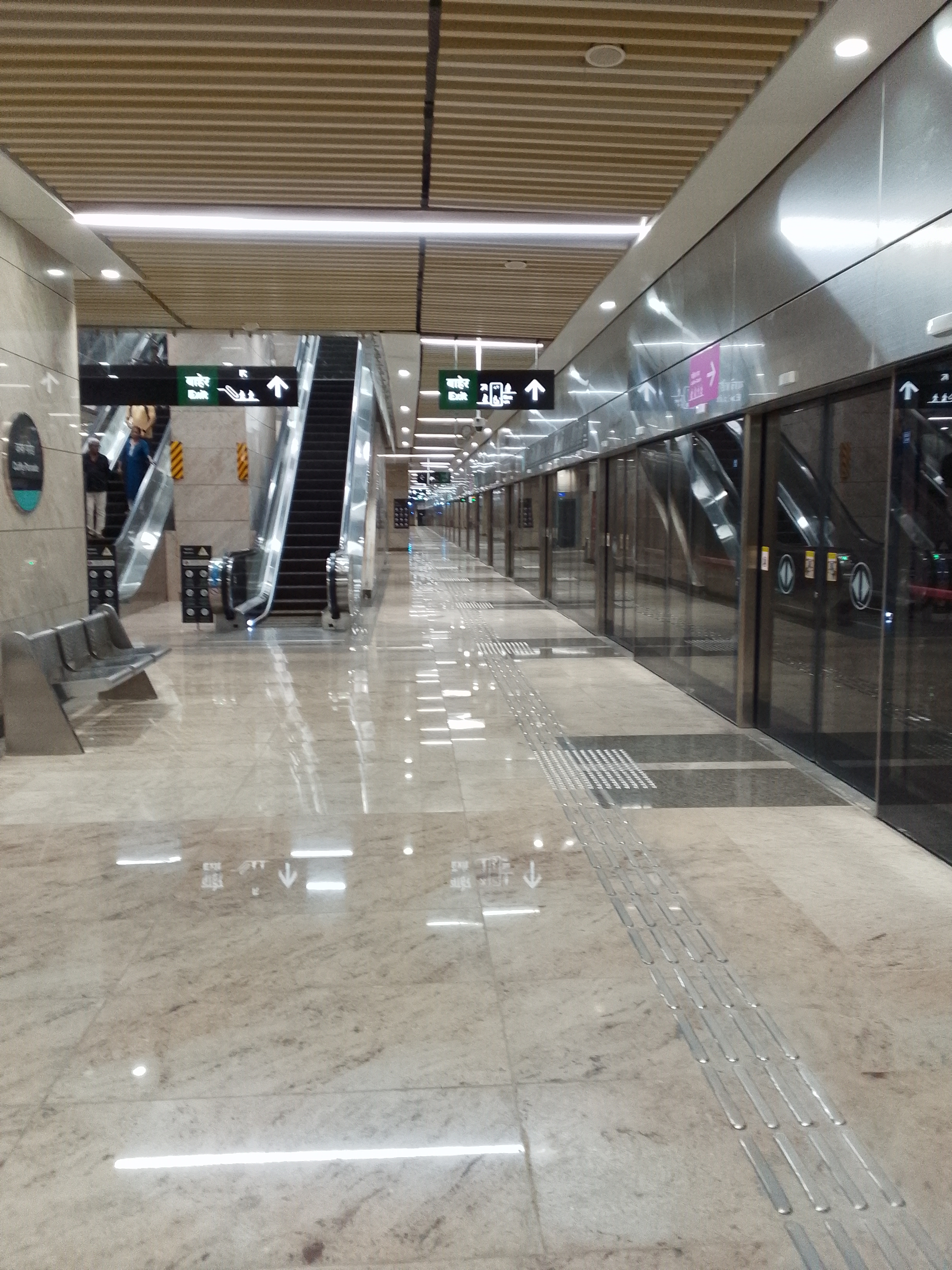
Mumbai Metro 3 Cuffe Parade station

Despite providing connectivity to Mumbai's airport, passengers on Metro 3 will not be permitted to carry their check-in luggage onboard trains. Only hand/cabin baggage will be allowed. MMRC officials stated that Metro 3 was not an "Airport Express line", but a regular city metro corridor. Officials explained that providing luggage check-in would require additional dwell time at the Airport metro station, which would increase the overall headway of the line, and disrupt services for other passengers.

Additionally, unlike other operational lines, the Aqua Line has restricted entry of bicycles, mostly due to lack of space during peak rush hours. However, the MMRCL has announced plans to allow bicycles once the entire route is operational.

=== Fare collection ===
Metro 3 will utilize an open loop automated fare collection system. Passengers will be able to pay for travel using contactless pre-paid and post-paid smart cards issued by partnering banks. Only RuPay debit and credit cards will be accepted on Metro 3.

In March 2017, the MMRC held a pre-bid meeting with all pre-qualified bidders for the "Design, Manufacture, Supply, Installation, Testing and Commissioning of Tunnel Ventilation & Environmental Control System." In the same month, the agency received 12 bids from consortia to set up an automatic fare collection system.

In March 2020, MMRC expressed its displeasure over Tata Power's revised electricity tariffs and announced it could result in higher fares for passengers when the line opens.

=== Non-fare revenue ===
MMRCL licensed co-branding rights or semi-naming rights for five stations on the metro line at ₹216 crore on 22 September 2022. The naming rights were provided to the following entities for a period of five years:

- Kotak Mahindra Bank - BKC & CSMT Metro
- State Bank of India - CSMIA Terminal 2, Dadar Metro & Vidhan Bhavan
- Life Insurance Corporation - Churchgate Metro & Hutatma Chowk
- ICICI Lombard - Siddhivinayak
- Nippon India Mutual Fund - Acharya Atre Chowk
- ICICI Prudential Mutual Fund - Santacruz Metro
- HDFC Life - Mahalaxmi Metro
- Mahindra - Worli
- AU Bank - Bandra Colony

The naming rights include the branding space inside the station, mentioning in train announcements and station maps and prefixing the name of the brand to the station name.

Times Innovative media OOH Pvt. Ltd, a leading Indian OOH agency responsible for advertising in Metro line 1, has secured the advertisement rights from MMRCL for all the 27 stations and 31 trains.

MMRCL leased over 1.3lac sq. ft of commercial spaces over 27 stations on 17 January 2025 to entities like majors such as Tata Trent, Chitale Bandhu and Delicia Foods. It aimed to earn a revenue of ₹20 crore.

== Gallery ==
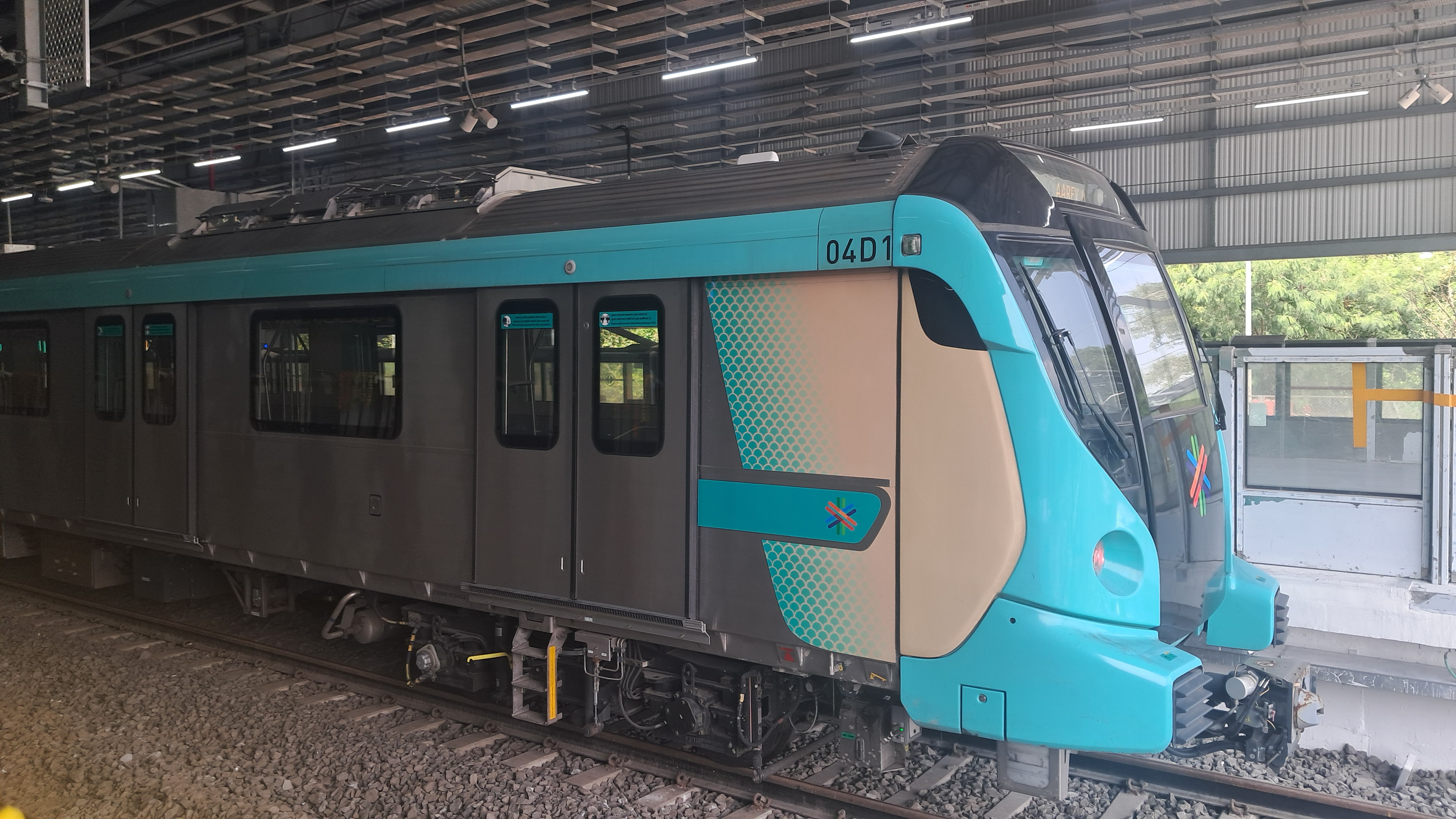
Metro Aqua Line rake at Aarey JVLR Metro Station

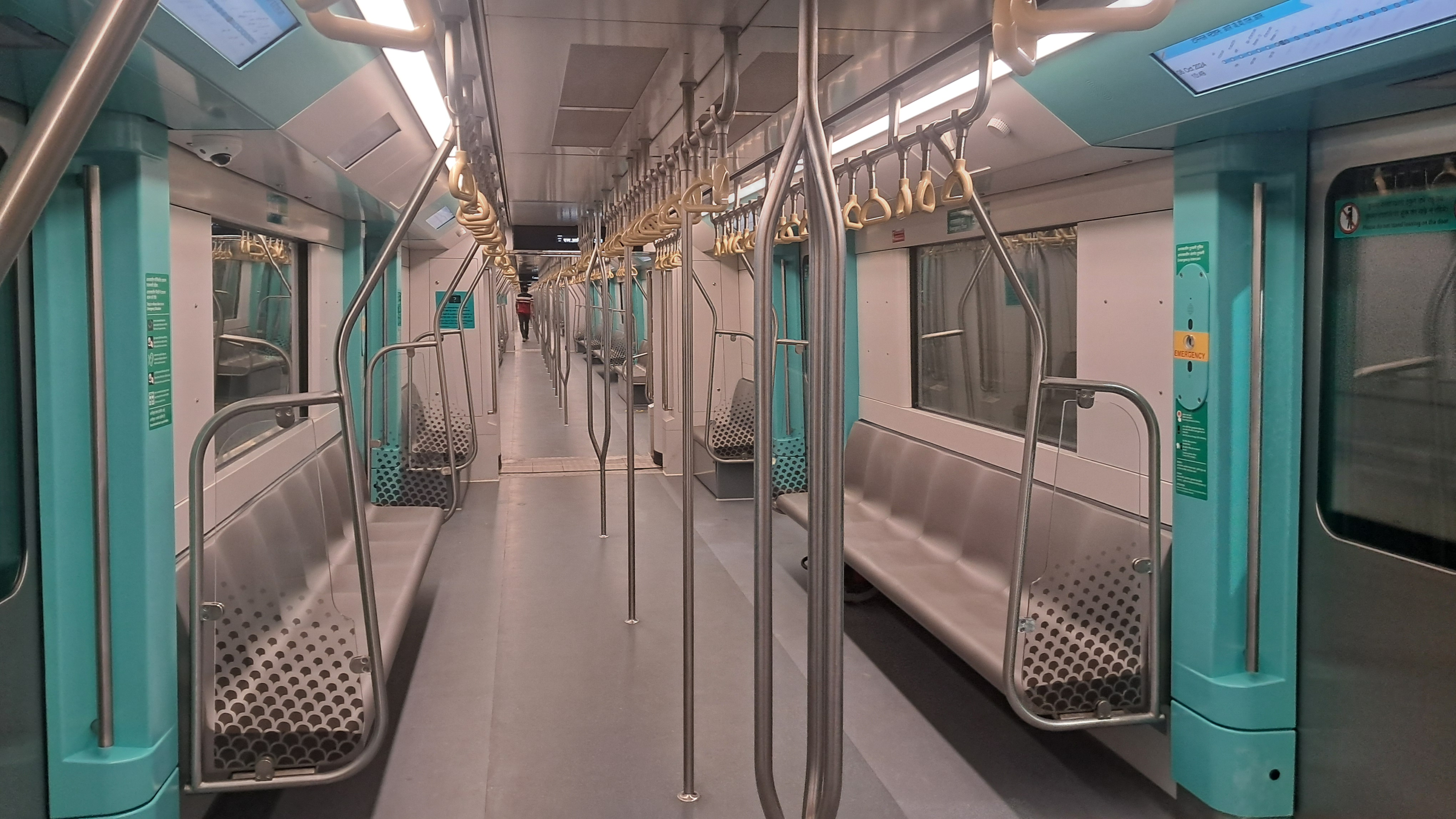
Interior of the train rake

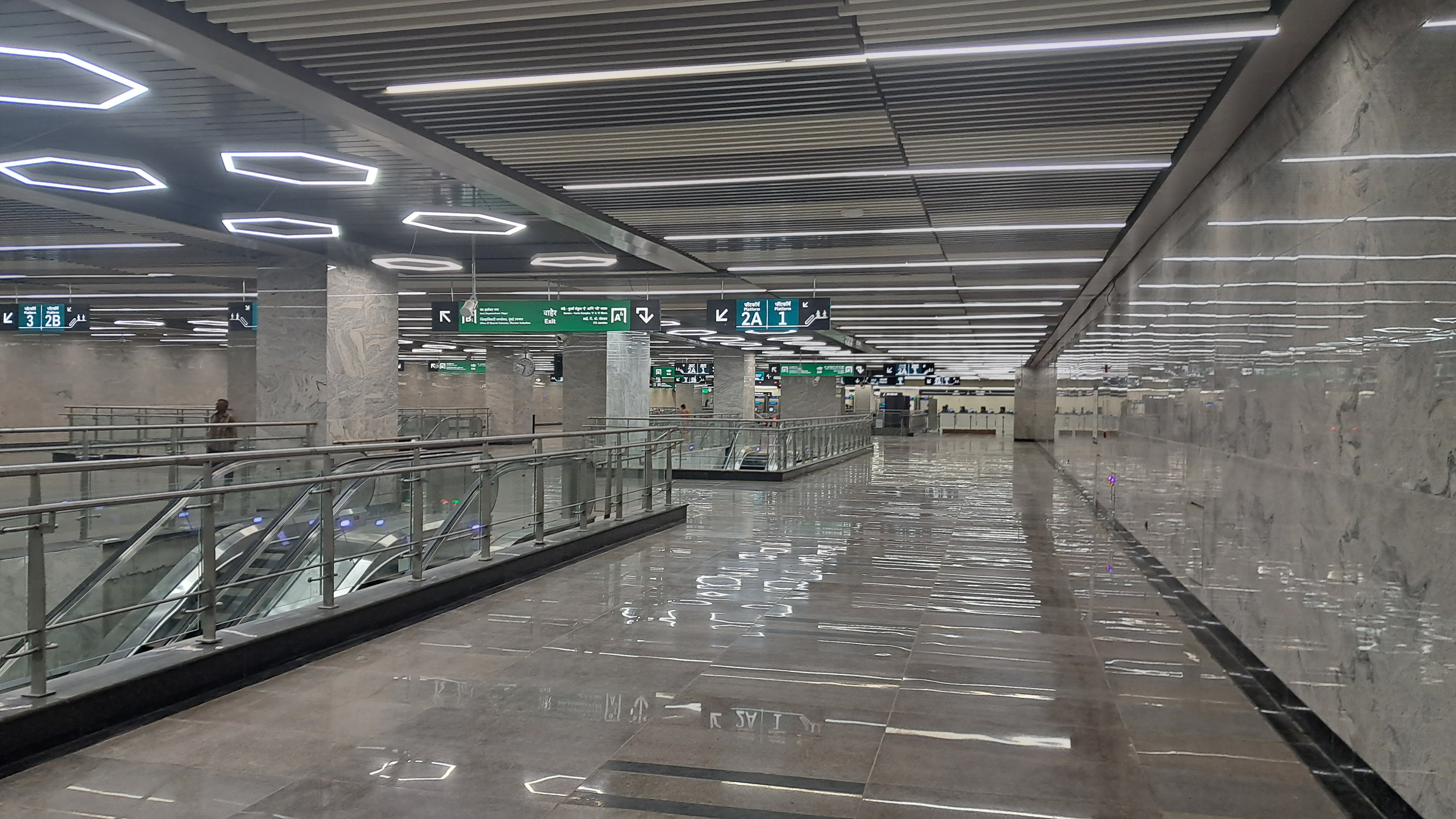
Concourse of KOTAK BKC Metro Station

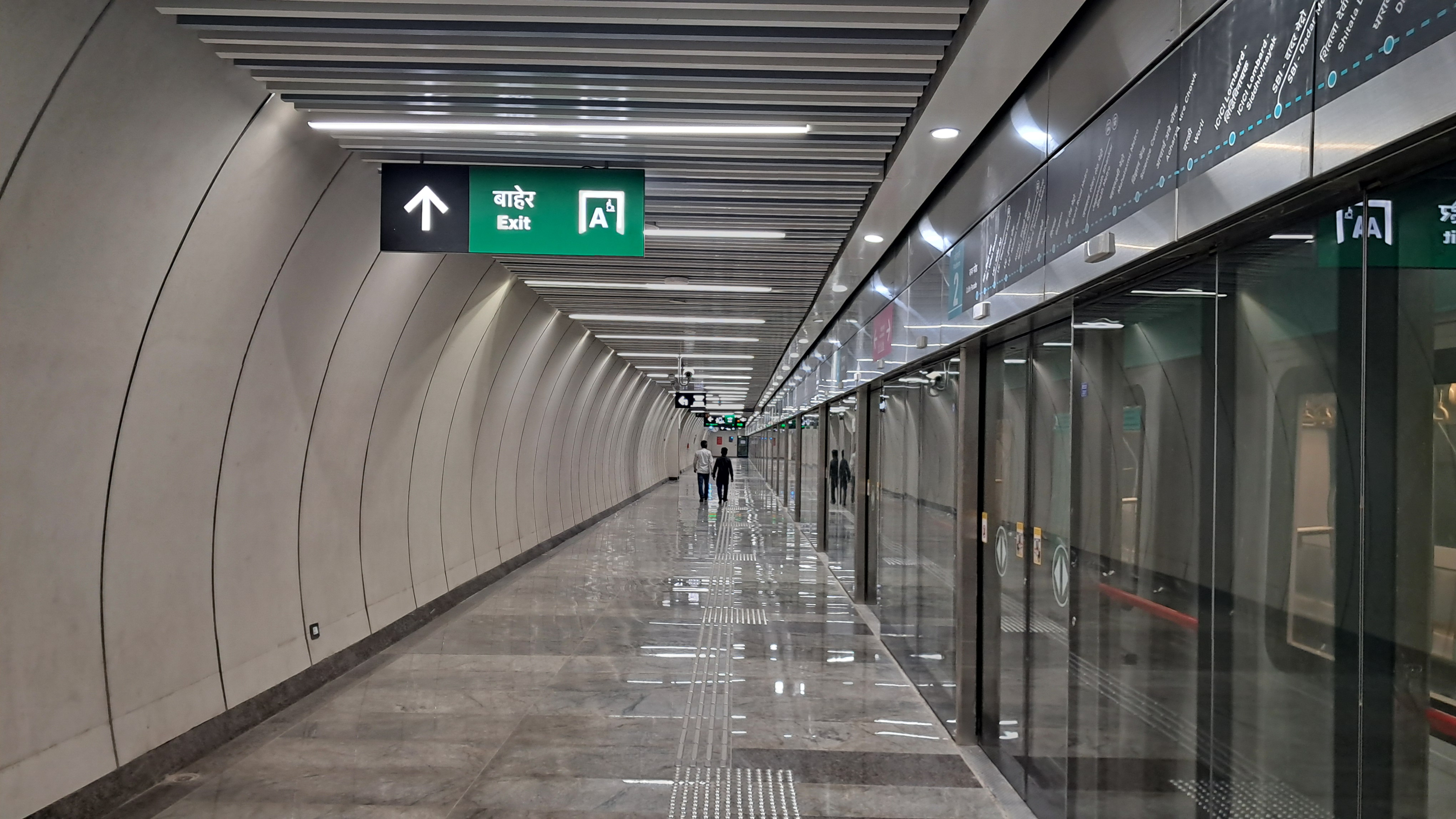
Marol Naka Underground Metro Station, view of platform

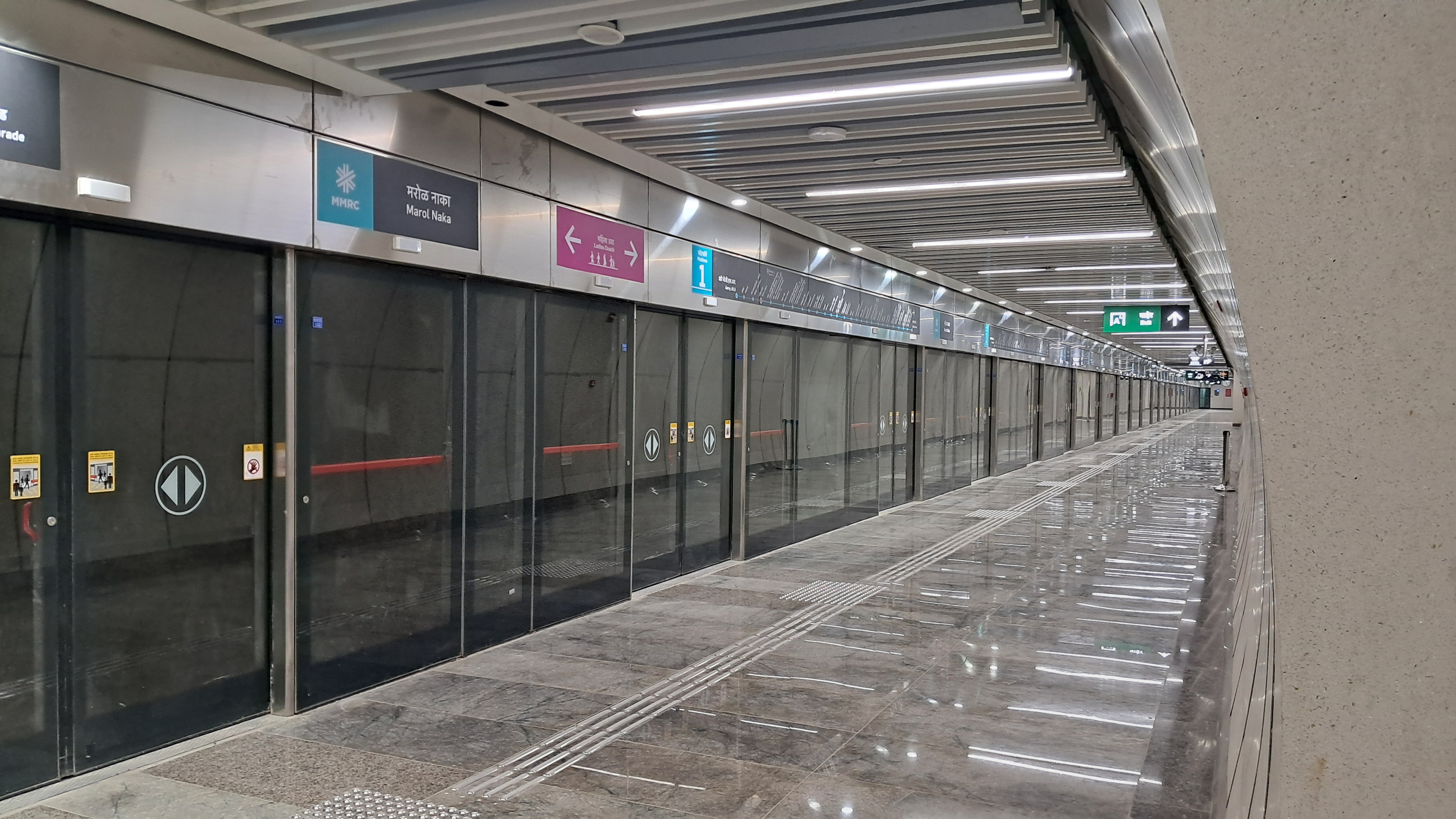
Platform of Marol Naka Station

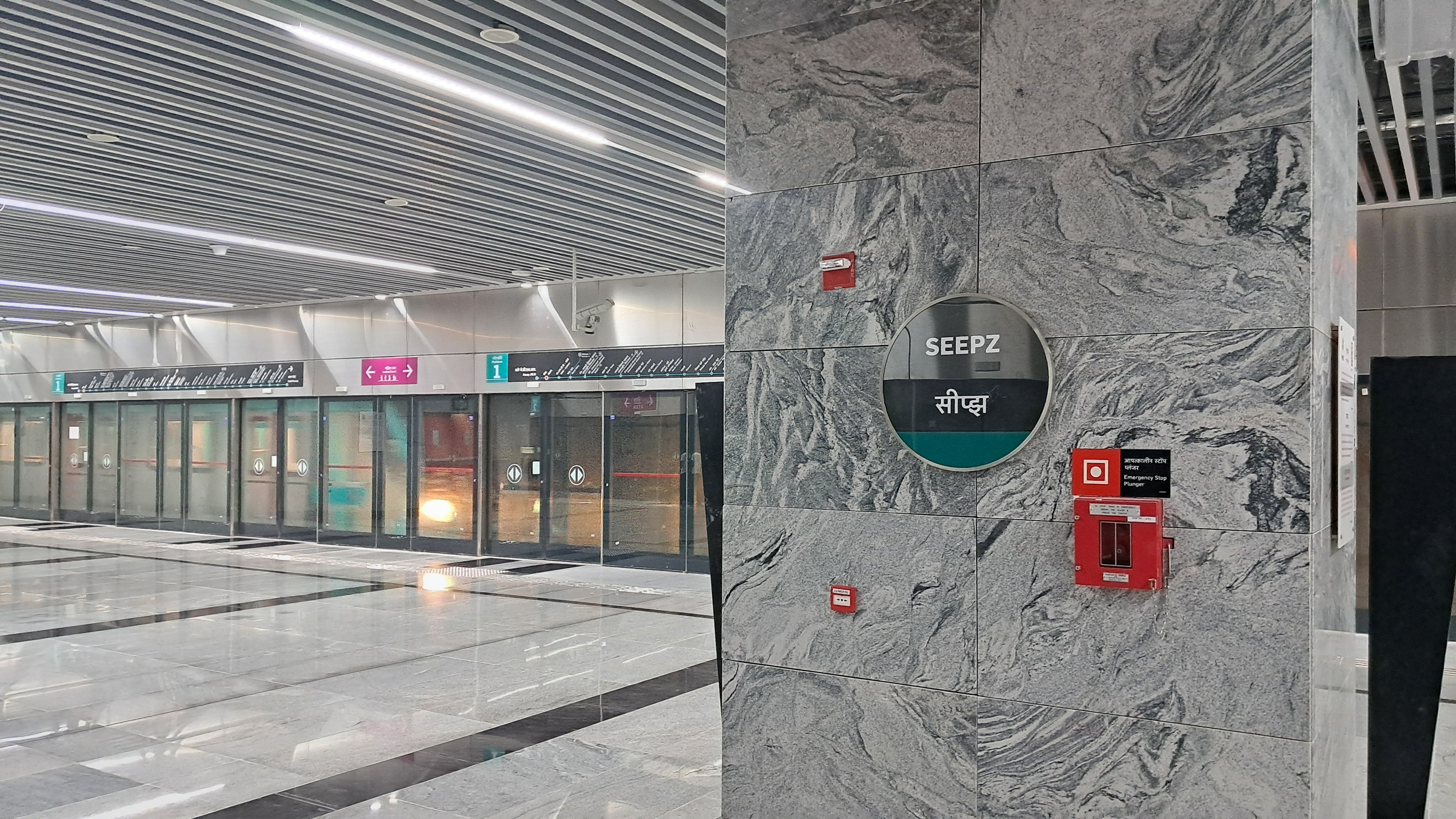
SEEPZ Underground Metro Station

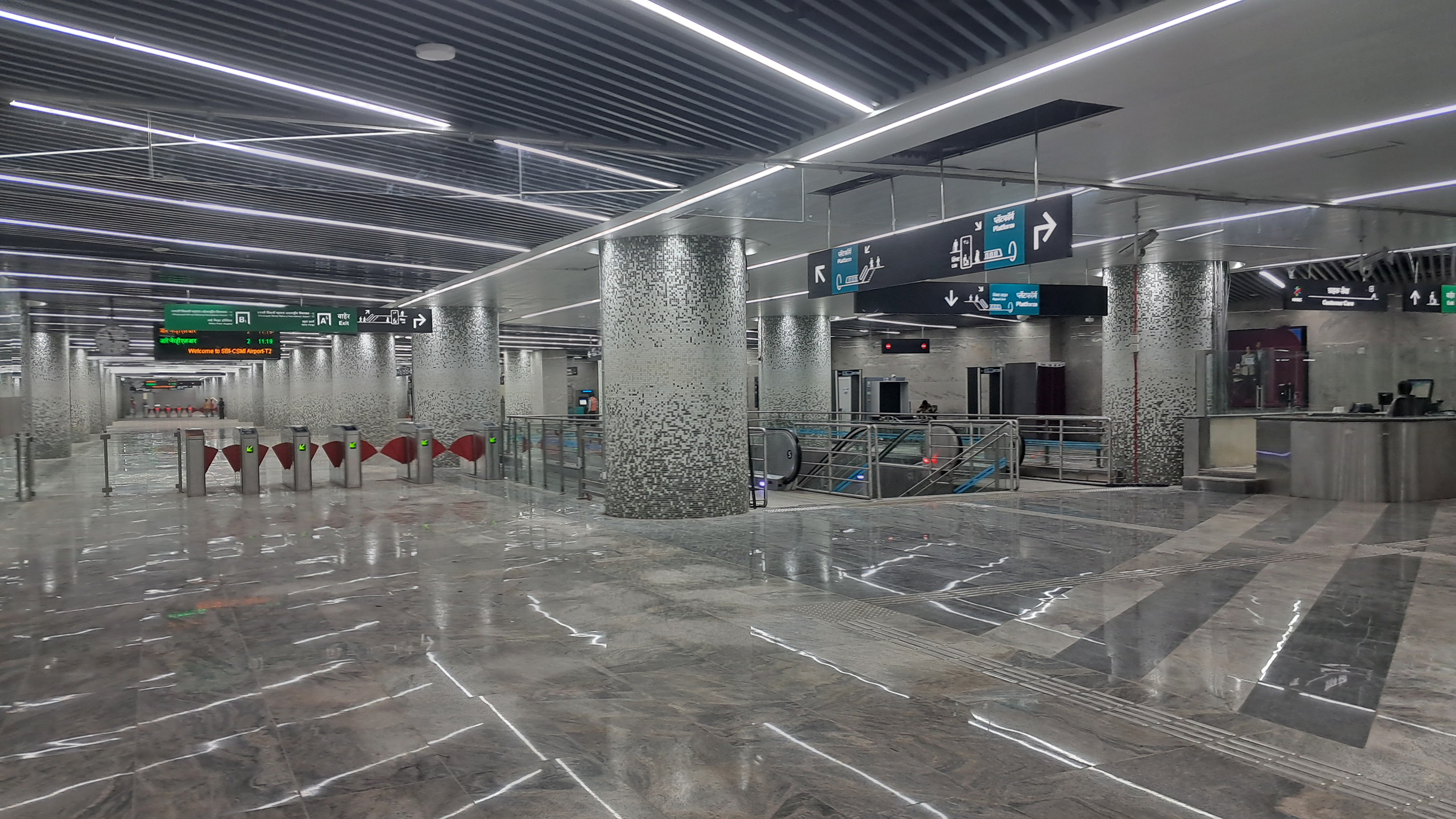
View of SBI CSMI-T2 Airport Metro Station concourse

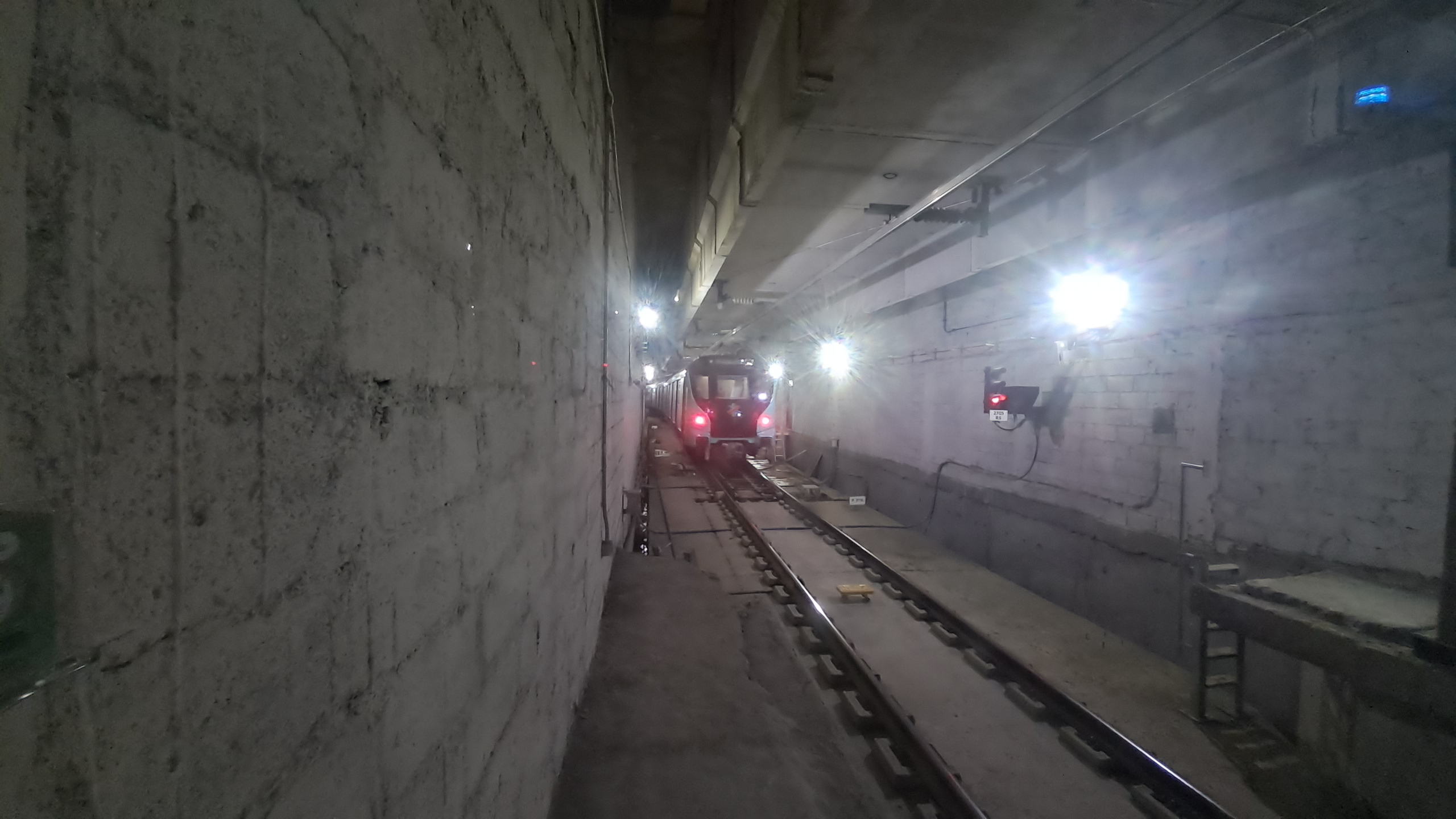
A Metro leaving KOTAK BKC Metro Station

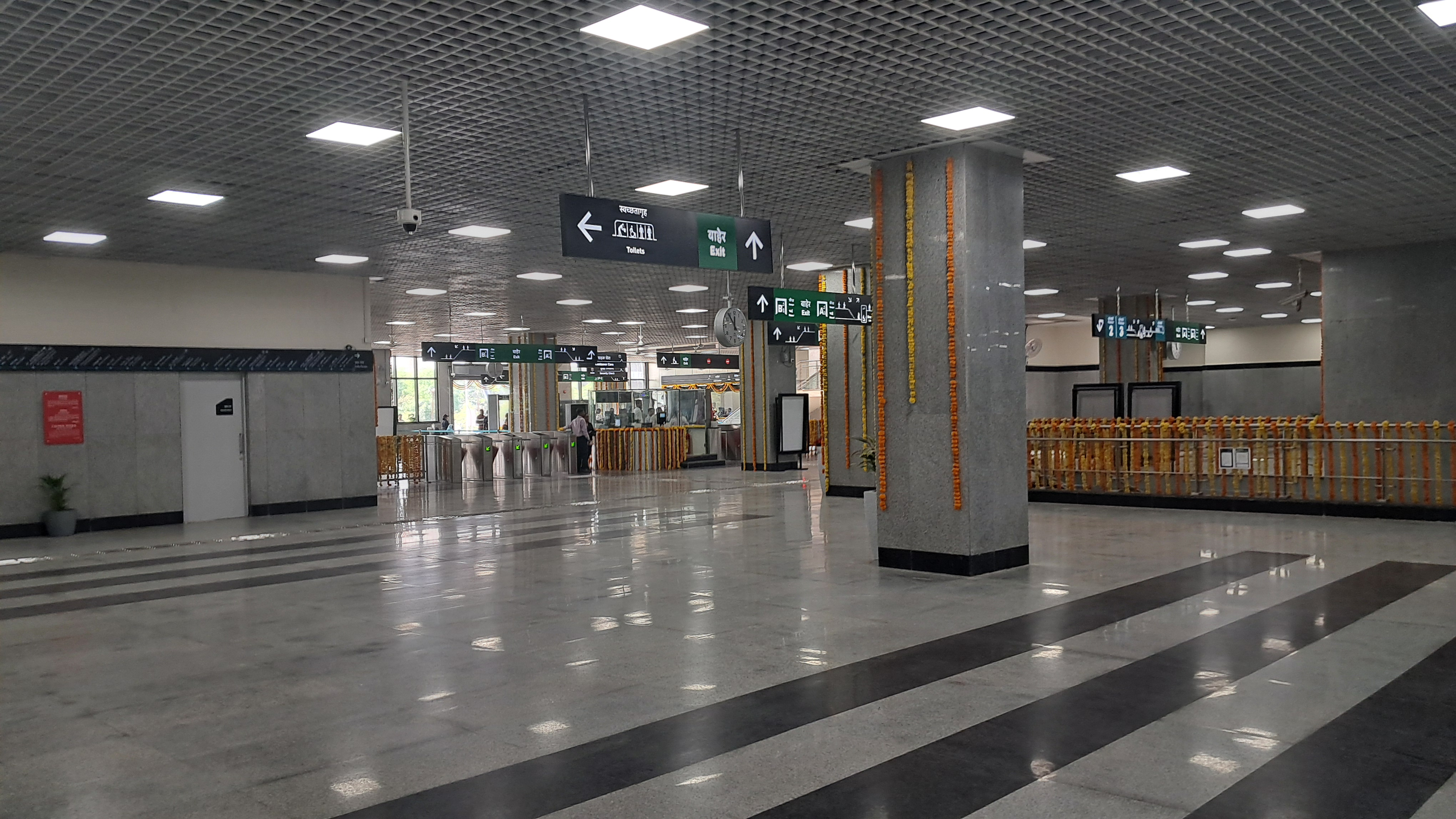
View of Aarey JVLR Metro Station

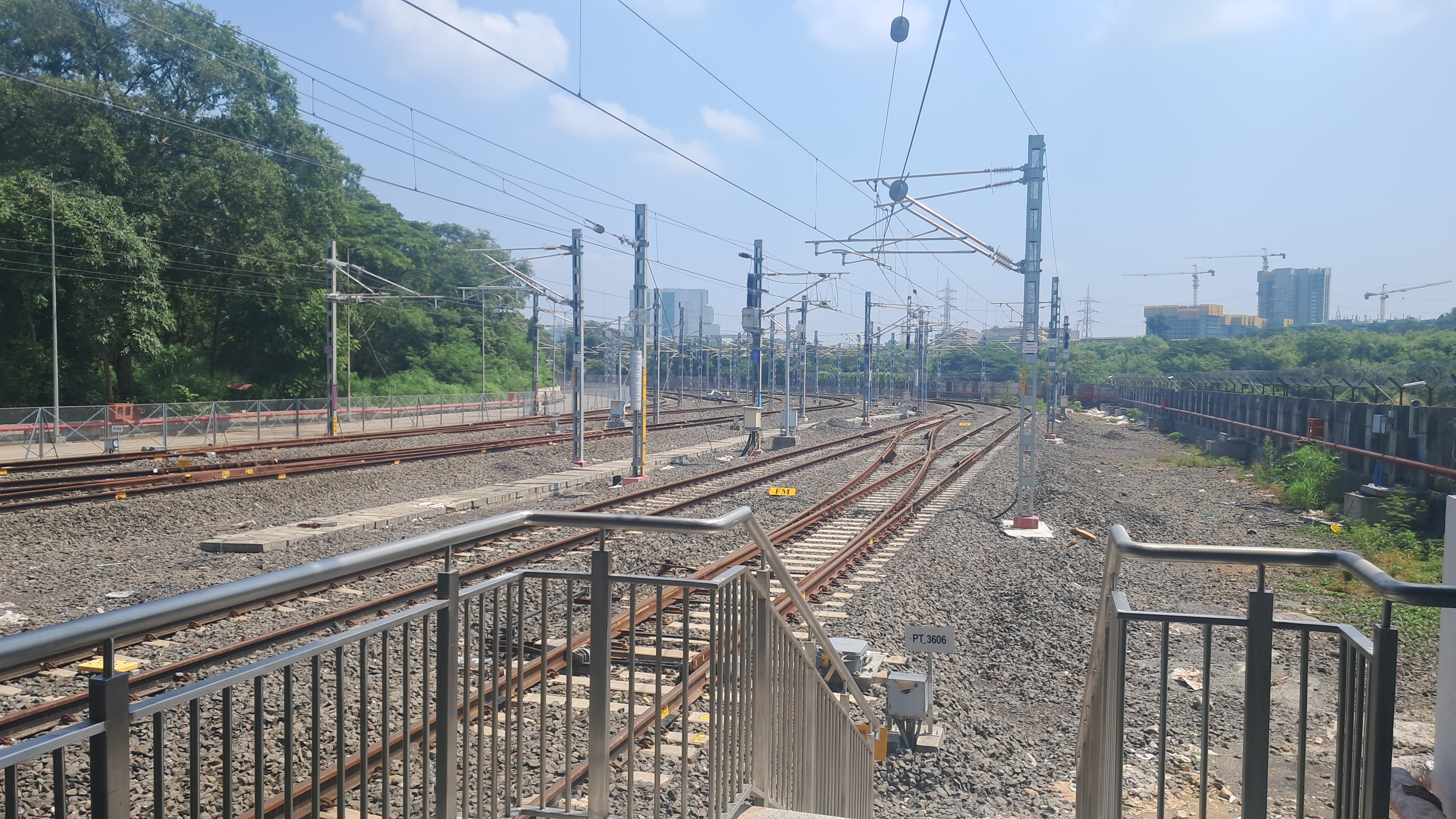
Aarey JVLR Metro Station, post-station tracks

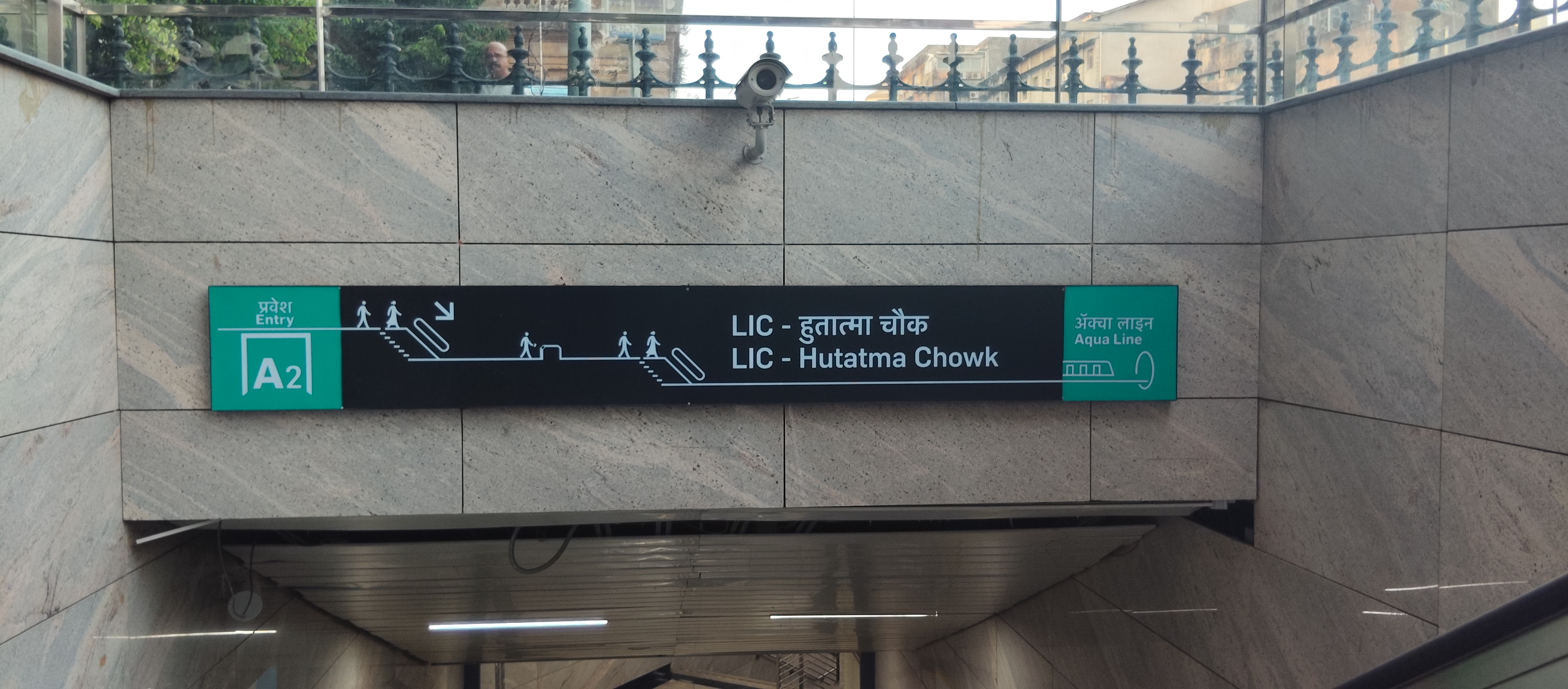
Entrance to the Hutatma Chowk station

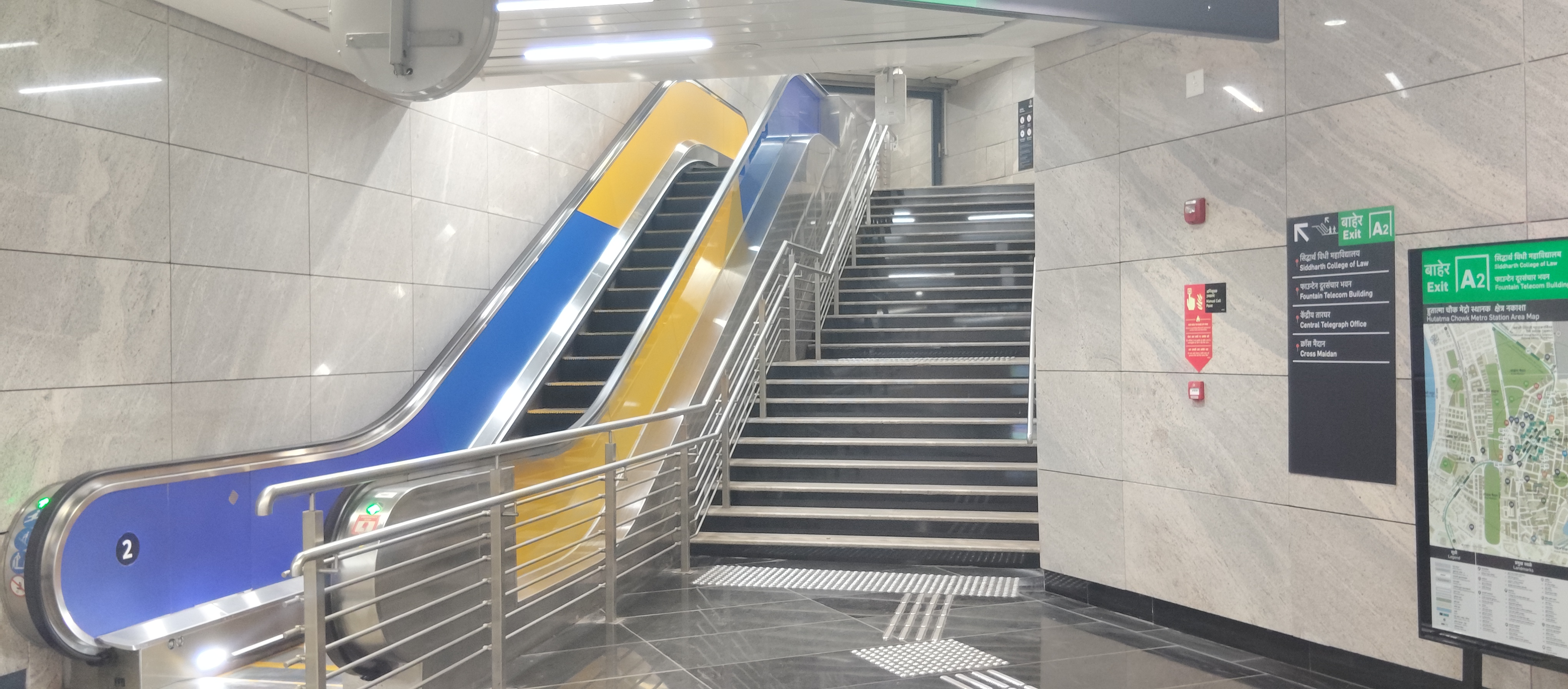
Escalator and Entrance Stairs at Hutatma Chowk station

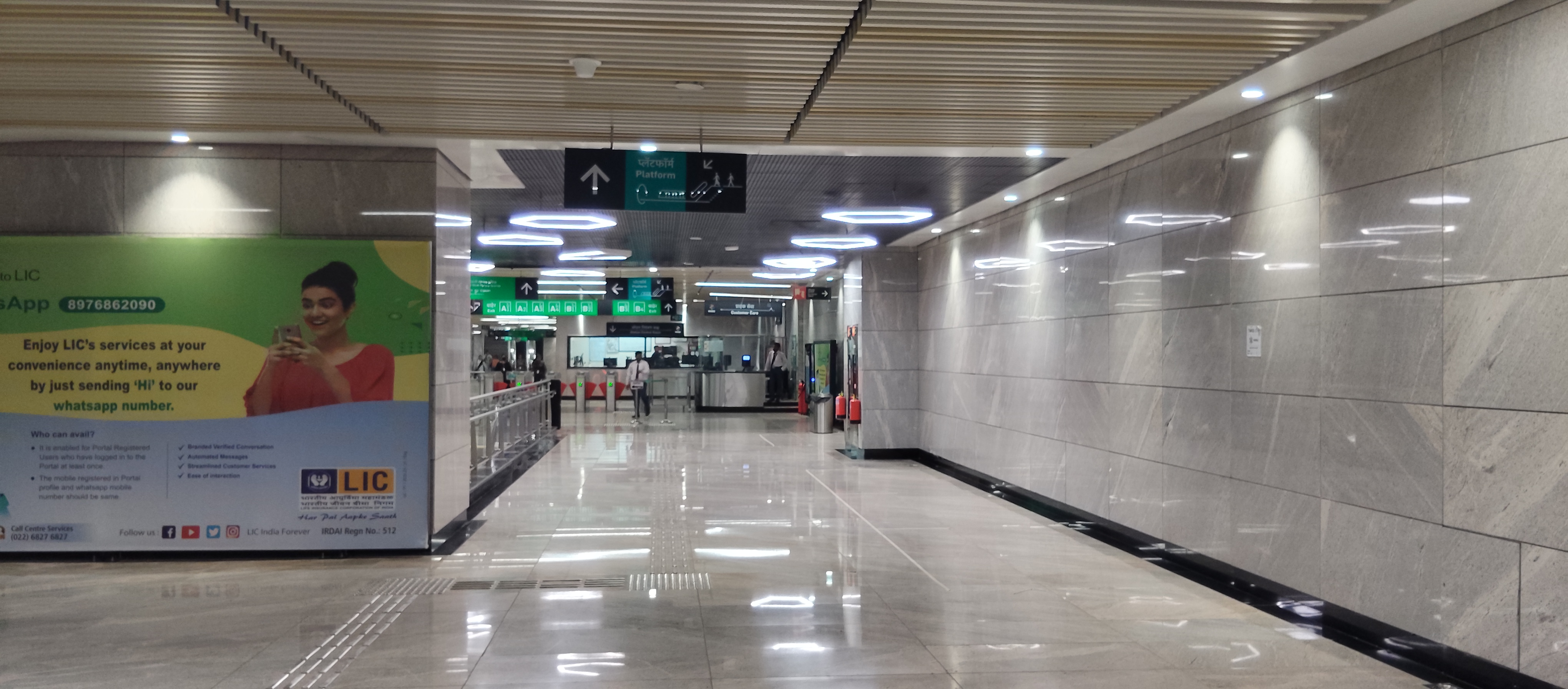
View of the Hutatma Chowk station Concourse

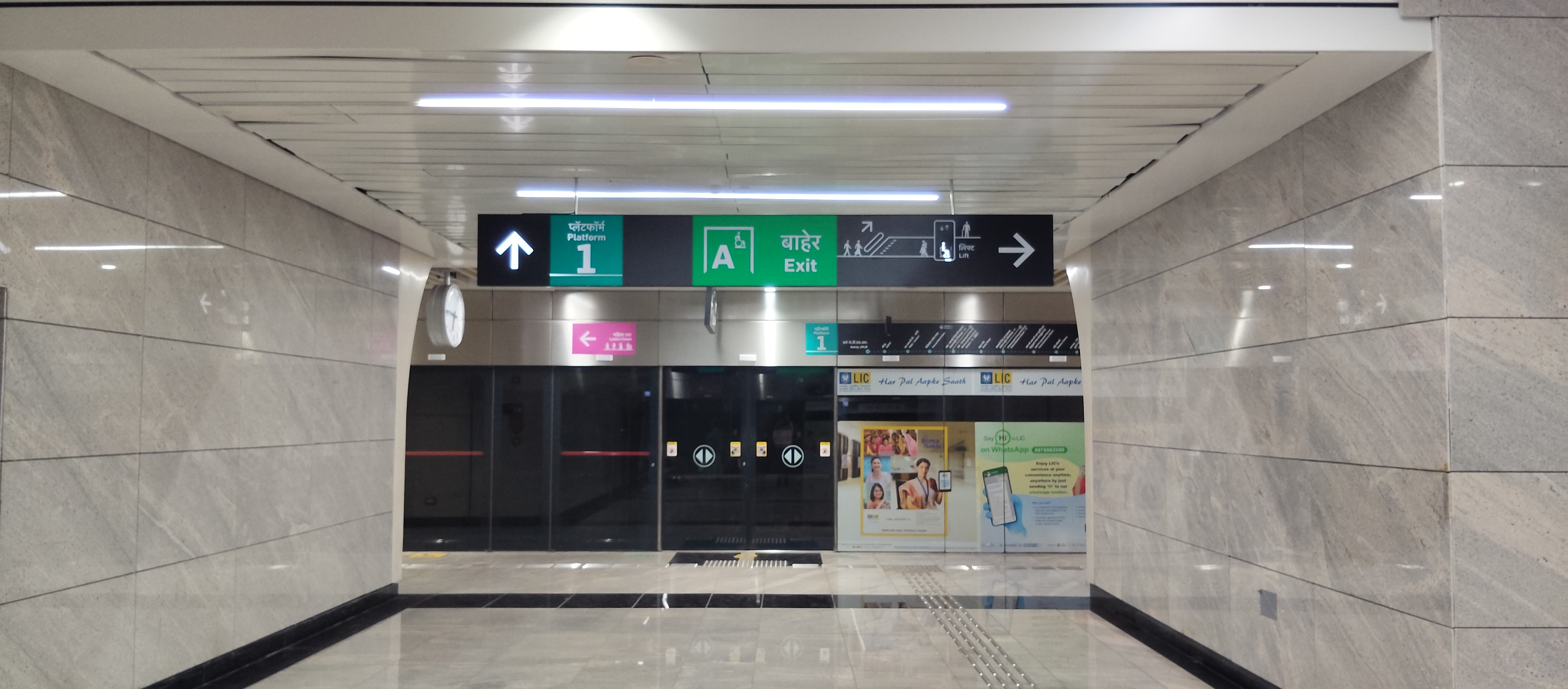
Cross platform corridors at Hutatma Chowk station

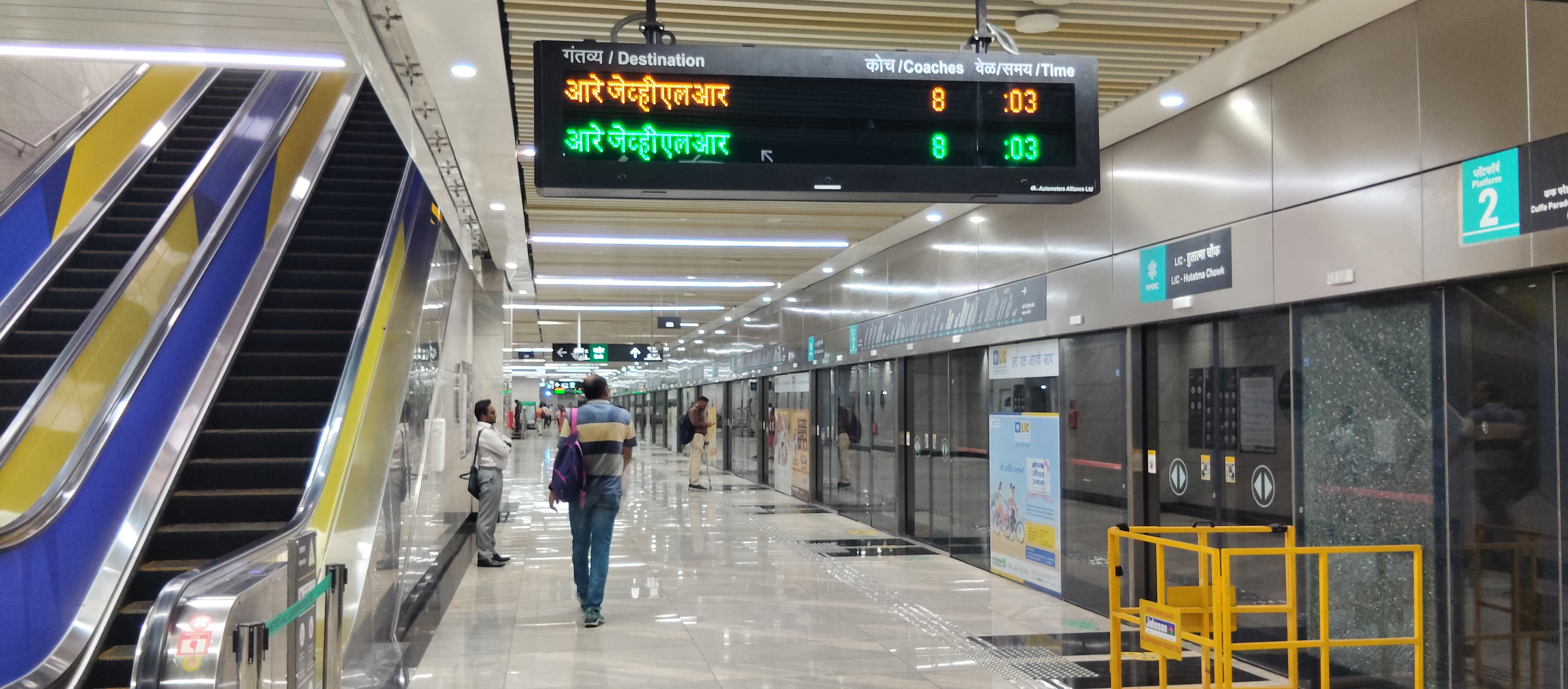
View of Aarey bound platform of Hutatma Chowk station

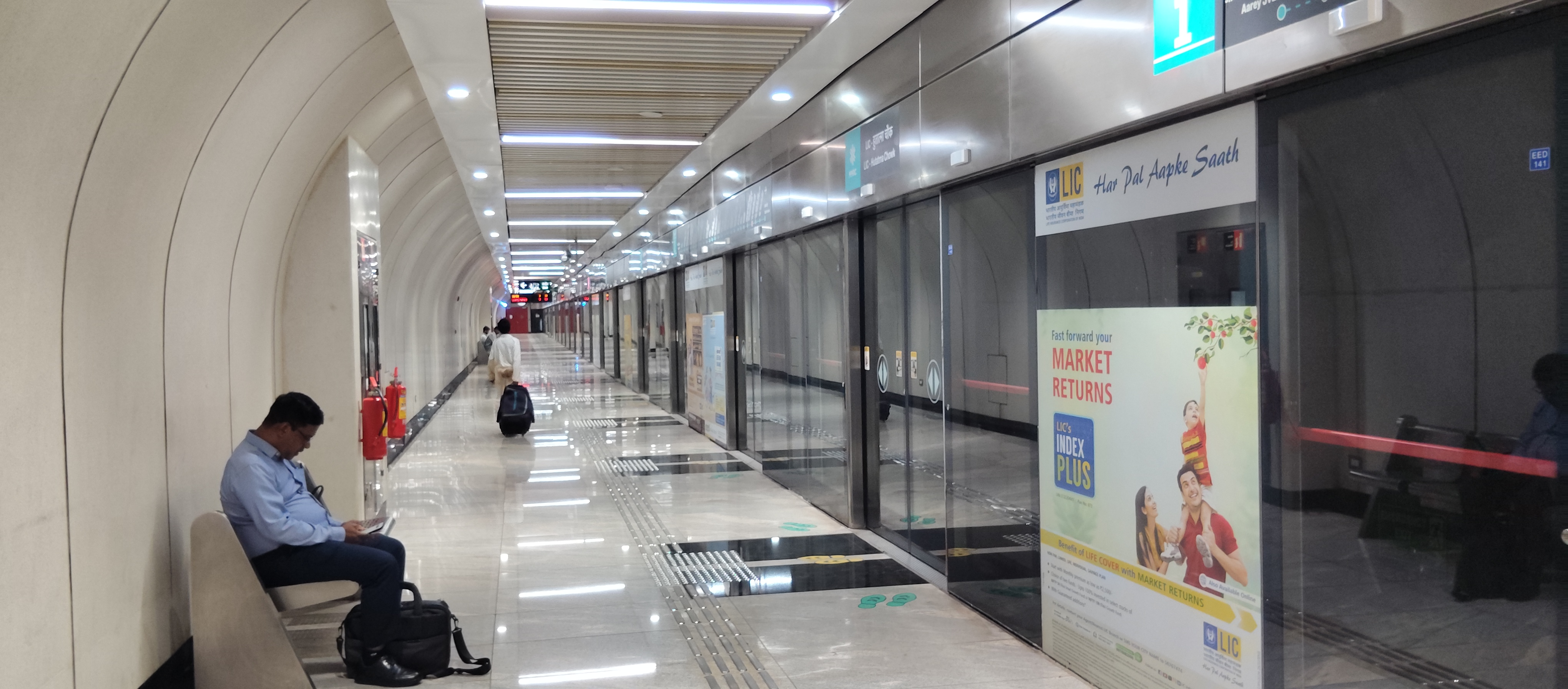
View of Cuffe Parade bound platform of Hutatma Chowk station

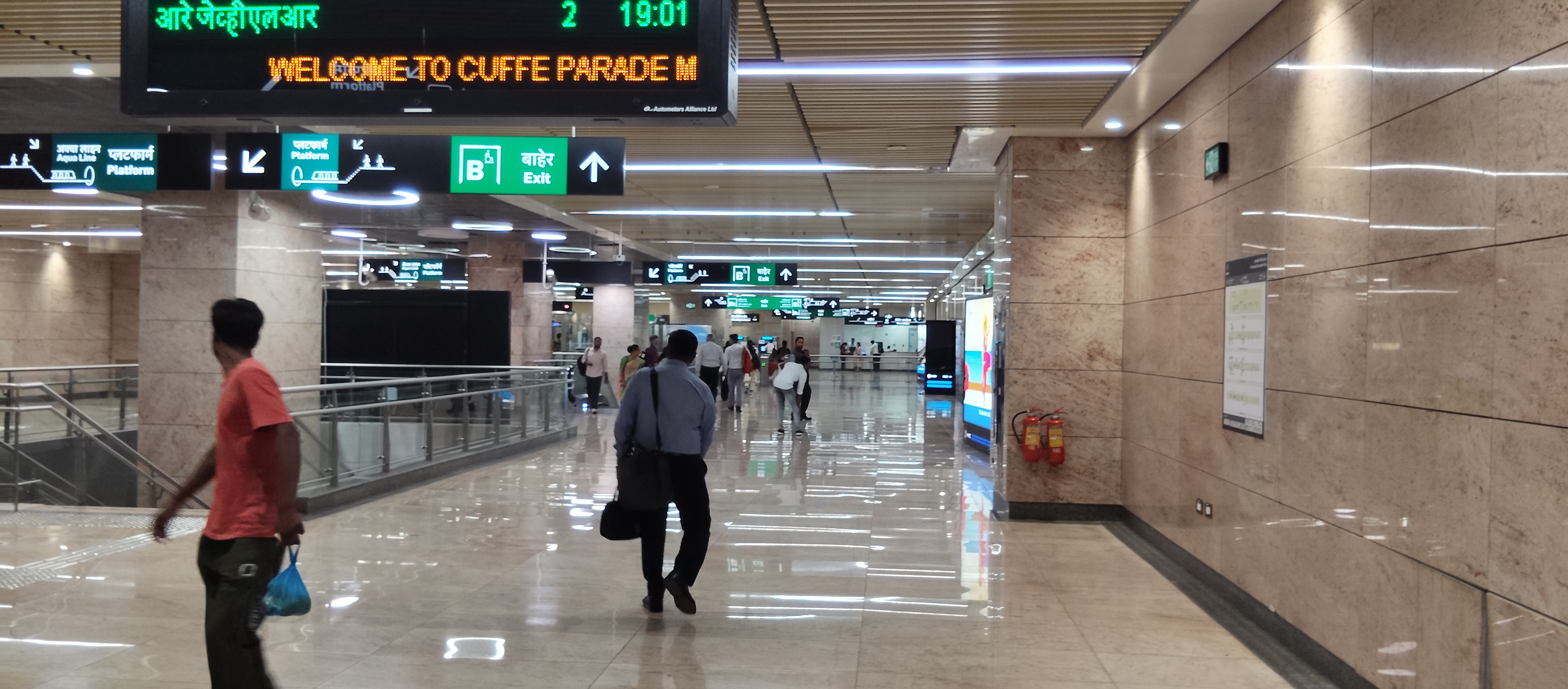
View of Cuffe Parade station Concourse

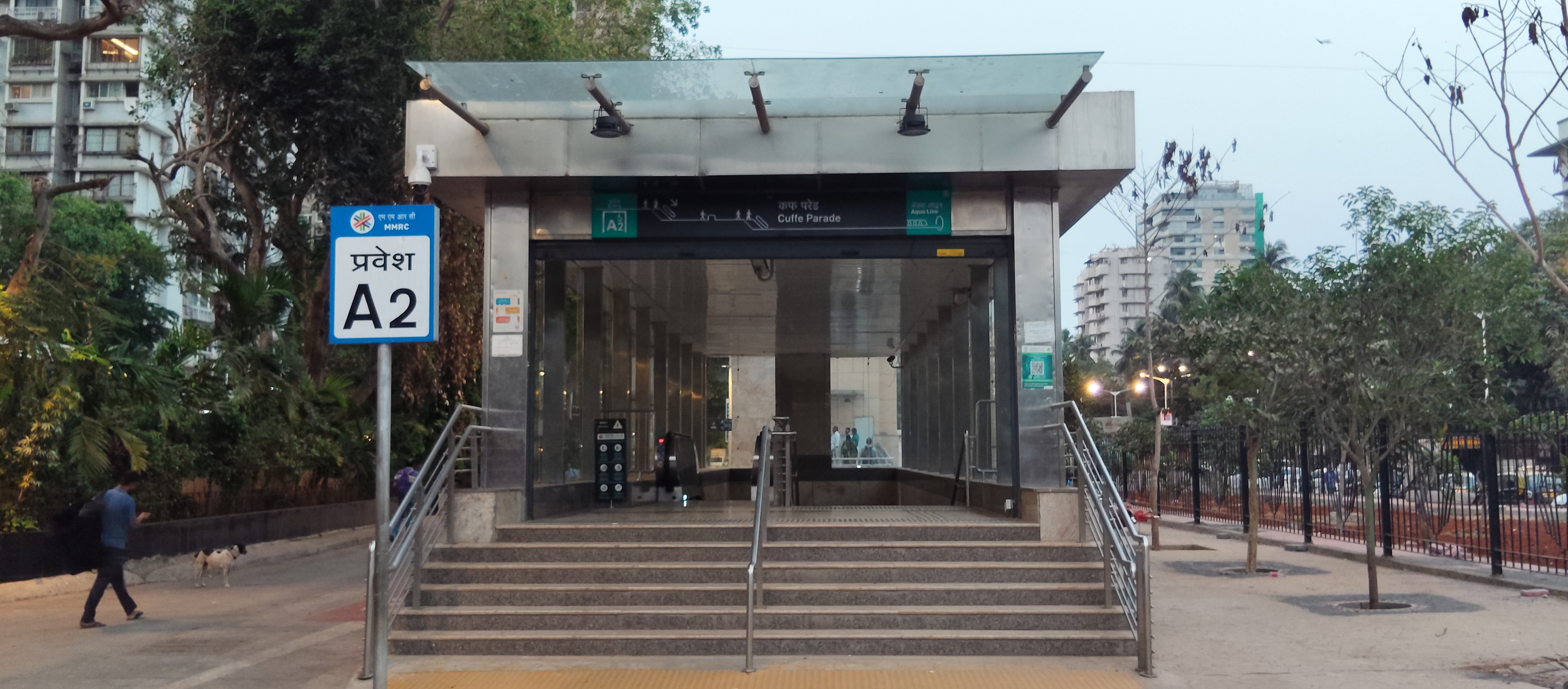
Entrance to the Cuffe Parade station
