= Ashwini Bhide =

Indian IAS officer

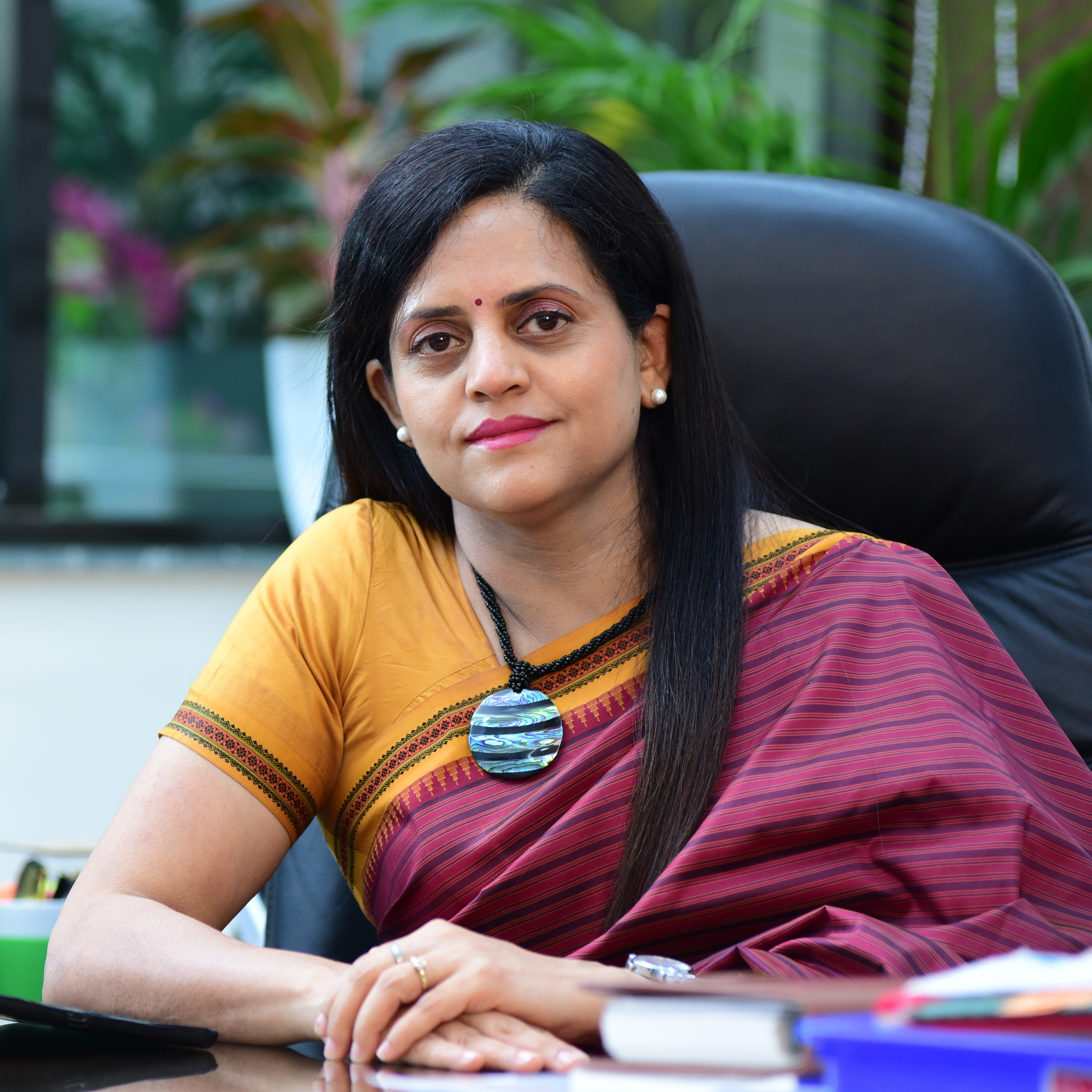
- Ashwini Bhide in 2019

Municipal Commissioner, Brihanmumbai Municipal Corporation
- Incumbent
- Assumed office 31 March 2026

Additional Chief Secretary, Chief Minister Office
- Incumbent
- Assumed office 31 March 2026

Managing Director of Mumbai Metro Rail Corporation
- In office 5 January 2015 – 22 January 2020
- Succeeded by: Ranjit Singh Deol

Secretary School Education and Sports, Government of Maharashtra
- In office February 2014 – January 2015

Additional Metropolitan Commissioner of Mumbai Metropolitan Region Development Authority
- In office September 2008 – February 2014

Personal details
- Born: 25 May 1970 (age 56) Sangli, Maharashtra, India

Ashwini Bhide is an Indian Administrative Service (IAS) officer, predominantly known for her work on the Aqua Line, popularly known as Line 3 of the Mumbai Metro. She is Managing Director of Mumbai Metro Rail Corporation (MMRCL), which is a joint venture of the Government of India and Government of Maharashtra since its inception, i.e. 2015 until 2020.

In January 2020, she along with 20 other IAS officers from Maharashtra state were transferred by the newly formed coalition government led by Uddhav Thackeray. Prior to the new government coming to force, Aaditya Thackeray, whose party Shiv Sena was a member of the earlier Devendra Fadnavis-led government in the state, had demanded the transfer of Bhide citing differences in interest on construction of a metro car shed at Aarey Forest.

Bhide was named 'Woman Leader of the Year – Governance' at the ETPrime Women Leadership Awards in 2023.

== Career ==
Bhide started her career as the assistant collector of Kolhapur district from 1997 to 1999. Following this, she was posted as the chief executive officer (CEO) of Sindhudurg district from 1999 to 2000 following which she was transferred to Nagpur district.

Bhide was appointed the chief executive officer (CEO) of the Nagpur Zilla Parishad between 2000 and 2003 where she built 434 dams across 310 villages at a cost of ₹300,000 to bring 7,000 hectares of land under irrigation. Between 2004 and 2008, she was appointed as deputy secretary to the Governor of Maharashtra following which she was appointed as Additional Metropolitan Commissioner at the Mumbai Metropolitan Region Development Authority (MMRDA). She also served as School Education and Sports Secretary and was instrumental in bringing the Systematic Administrative Reforms for Achieving Learning by Students (SARAL) database online.

During her tenure at the MMRDA, she was seen as the driving force for several big ticket projects including the Eastern Freeway, Sahar Elevated Access Road, Mithi River cleanup which involved rehabilitation of over 4000 projected affected people, the Mumbai Monorail and the first line of the Mumbai Metro. Her work in the rehabilitation of 5,000 people across the city for various infrastructure projects has been considered a case study.

In March 2020, Bhide, who was till then not assigned a role post her exit from the MMRC, was deputed to the Municipal Corporation of Greater Mumbai (MCGM) taskforce as an Additional Municipal Commissioner to combat the ongoing COVID-19 pandemic in Maharashtra. Bhide has been tasked with overseeing the Corporation's contact tracing efforts as well as to monitor the control room and provide assistance to hospitals.

=== Mumbai Metro Rail Corporation ===
Bhide was appointed as the managing director of MMRC in 2015.
