= Santacruz metro station =

Mumbai Metro's Aqua Line metro station

Santacruz Metro
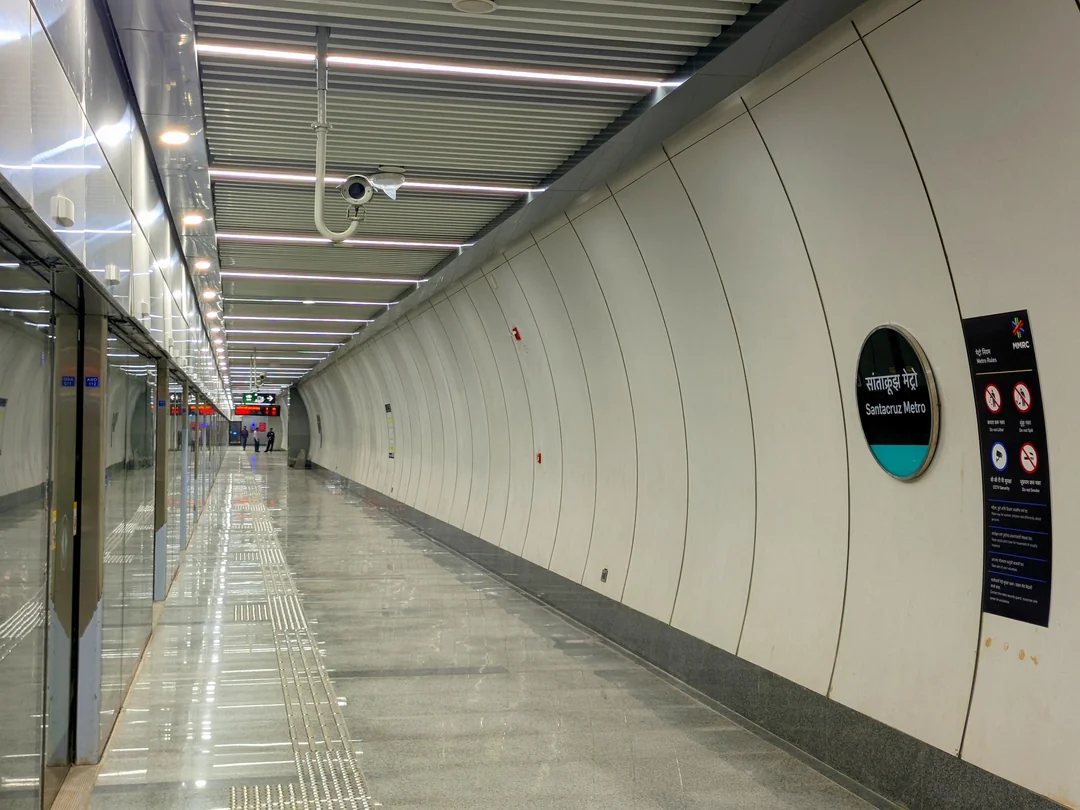
- Santacruz Metro station platform

General information
- Location: 2, Western Express Hwy, Davri Nagar, Vakola, Santacruz East, Mumbai, Maharashtra 400055
- Coordinates: 19°04′45″N 72°50′50″E
- Owner: Mumbai Metro Rail Corporation Ltd.
- Operator: Delhi Metro Rail Corporation
- Line: Line 3
- Platforms: 1 island platform

Construction
- Structure type: Underground
- Accessible: Yes

Other information
- Status: Staffed, Operational
- Station code: STZM

History
- Opened: 5 October 2024; 2 years ago

Services
Preceding station	Mumbai Metro	Following station
Bandra Colony towards Cuffe Parade	Line 3	CSMI Airport - T1 towards Aarey JVLR
Track layout
Location

Santacruz Metro (ICICI Prudential Mutual Fund Santacruz Metro) is an underground metro station on the north–south corridor of the Aqua Line 3 of Mumbai Metro in Mumbai, India. This metro station was inaugurated on 5 October 2024, by Prime Minister Narendra Modi, followed by the commencement of the metro service from 7 October 2024.

== Station Layout ==
G	Ground level	Exit/Entrance
L1	Concourse	Customer Service, Shops, Vending machine, ATMs
L2; Platforms	Platform 2	Towards Aarey JVLR (CSMI Airport - T1) →
L2; Platforms	Island platform
L2; Platforms	Entrance/exit vestibule
L2; Platforms	Island platform
L2; Platforms	Platform 1	← Towards Cuffe Parade (Bandra Colony)

== Entry/Exit ==
- A1 - University of Mumbai (Kalina University), Kalina
- A2 - Hanuman Tekdi, Maratha Colony
- B1 - Vakola, Kalina Military Campus
- B2 - Santacruz railway station, Sen Nagar
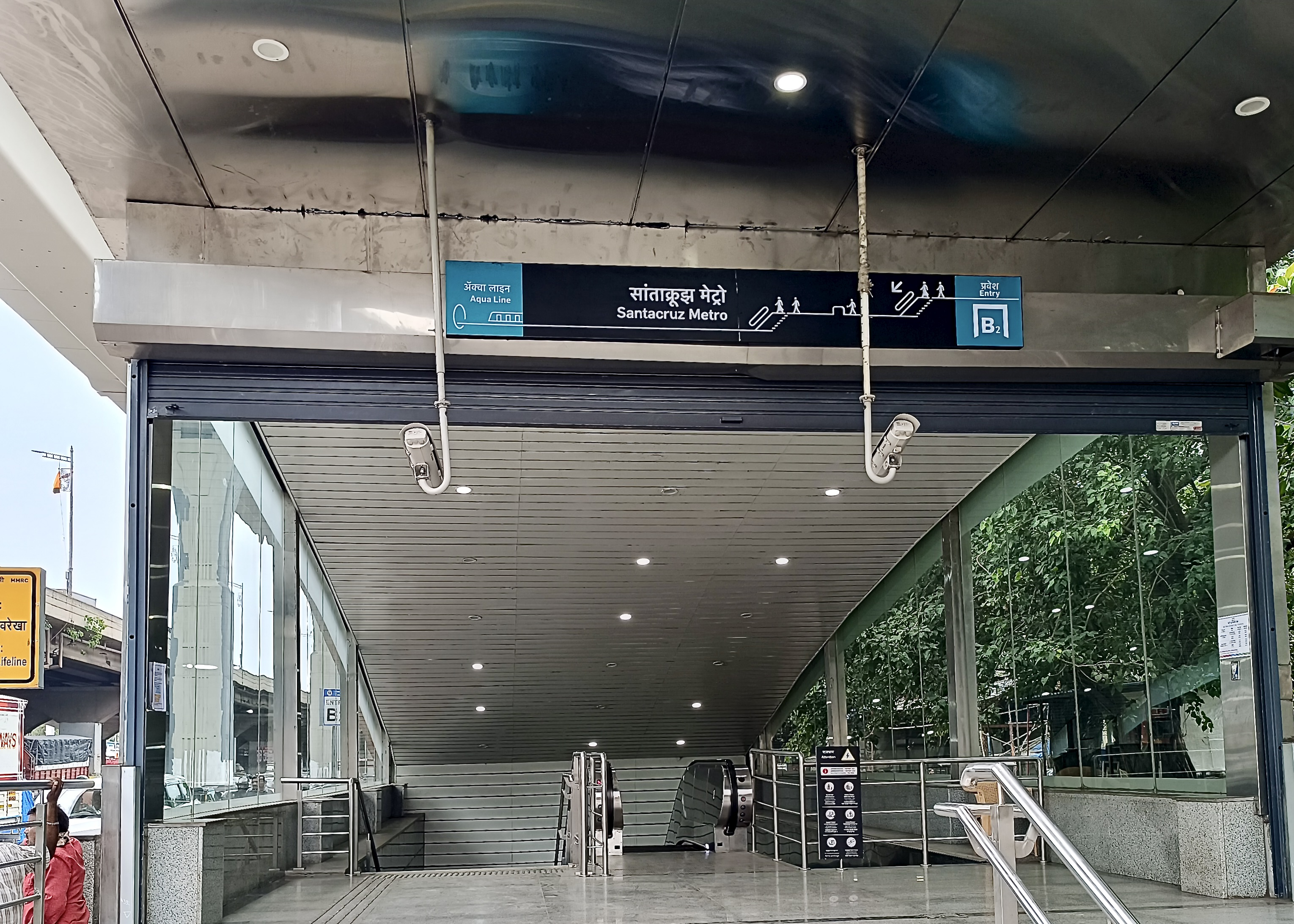
Santacruz Metro entrance B2

== See also ==
- Mumbai
- Public transport in Mumbai
- List of Mumbai Metro stations
- List of rapid transit systems in India
- List of Metro Systems
