= Miragaon metro station =

Mumbai Metro Red Line station in Mira-Bhayandar

Miragaon मिरागाव

General information
- Location: Kashimira, Mira Road East; Mira-Bhayandar, Maharashtra 401107; India
- Coordinates: 19°16′17″N 72°52′54″E
- Owner: Mumbai Metropolitan Region Development Authority
- Operator: Maha Mumbai Metro Operation Corporation Ltd.
- Line: Line 9
- Platforms: 2 side platforms
- Tracks: 2

Construction
- Structure type: Elevated
- Accessible: Yes

Other information
- Station code: 903

History
- Opened: 7 April 2026; 4 months ago
Services
Preceding station	Mumbai Metro	Following station
Kashigaon towards Subhash Chandra Bose Stadium	Line 9	Pandurang Wadi towards Dahisar (East)
Location

Miragaon is an elevated metro station on the Red Line of the Mumbai Metro, located in Kashimira, Mira-Bhayandar, Maharashtra, India. The station is owned by the Mumbai Metropolitan Region Development Authority (MMRDA) and was opened to the public on 7 April 2026 as part of Phase 1 of Line 9. A future interchange with the Green Line (Line 10) is proposed at this station, which will connect to Gaimukh and Shivaji Chowk (Mira Road).

== History ==
The station was constructed by J Kumar Infraprojects as part of a ₹1,998 crore (US$210 million) contract awarded by MMRDA in September 2019 for the design and construction of Line 9 and Line 7A.

Miragaon was opened on 7 April 2026, when Phase 1 of Line 9 was inaugurated by Chief Minister Devendra Fadnavis along with Deputy Chief Ministers Eknath Shinde and Sunetra Pawar. Commercial services began on 8 April 2026.

=== Power and signalling system ===
Like all other stations on the Mumbai Metro, Miragaon uses a 25,000 volt AC power system by "overhead catenary" to operate the trains. The station uses the Alstom Urbalis 400 communications-based train control (CBTC) signalling system.
