= Ovaripada metro station =

Mumbai Metro's Red Line 7 terminal metro station

Ovaripada ओवरीपाडा
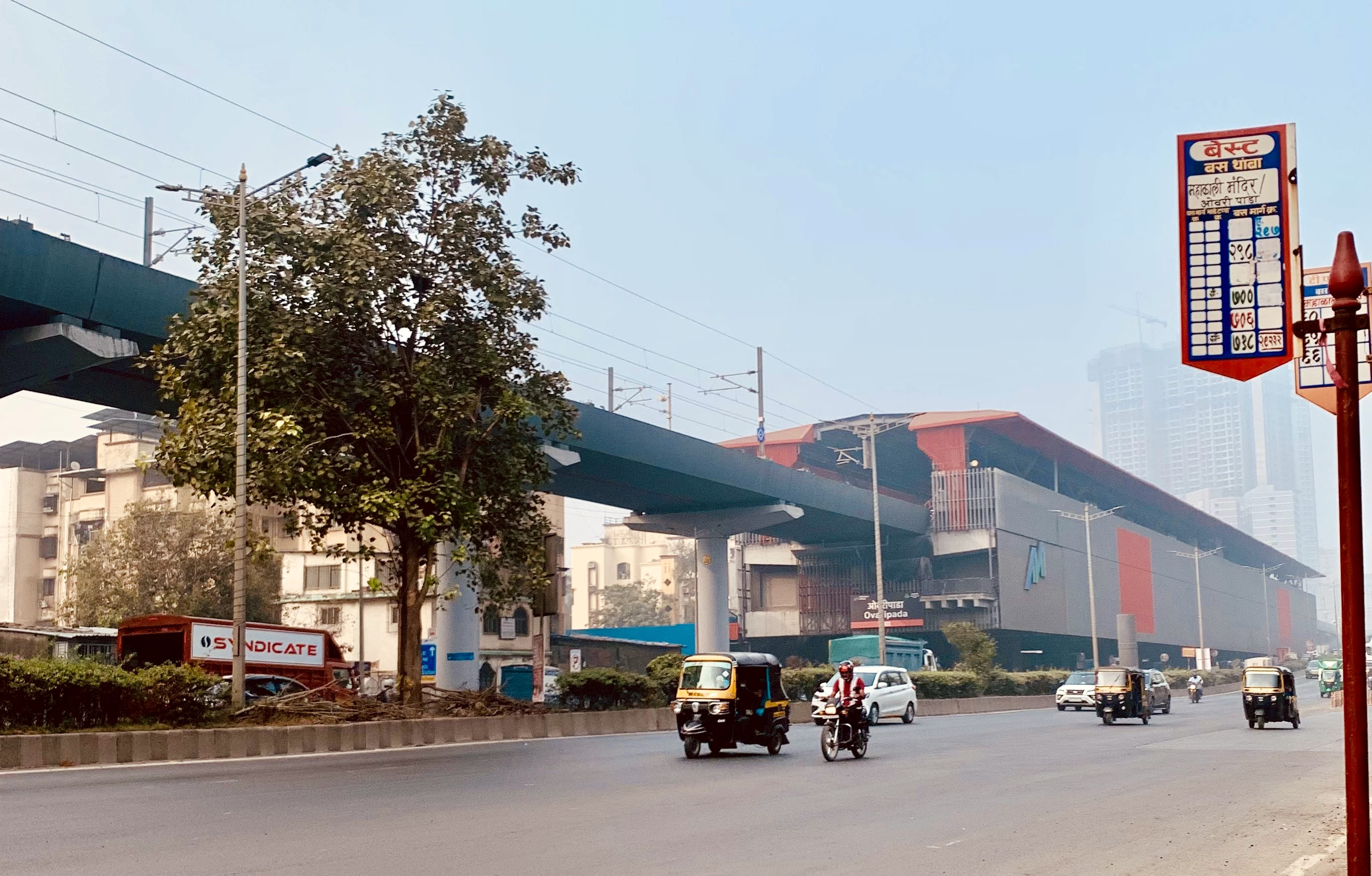

General information
- Location: Ovaripada, Borivali, Mumbai, Maharashtra 400068
- Coordinates: 19°14′36″N 72°51′51″E
- Owner: Mumbai Metropolitan Region Development Authority
- Operator: Maha Mumbai Metro Operation Corporation Ltd.
- Line: Line 7
- Platforms: 2 side platforms

Construction
- Structure type: Elevated
- Parking: No
- Accessible: Yes

Other information
- Station code: 701

History
- Opened: 2 April 2022; 4 years ago

Services
| Preceding station | Mumbai Metro | Following station |
|---|---|---|
| Dahisar East 901 Terminus | Line 7 | Rashtriya Udyan 702 towards Gundavali |
Route map
Red Line
Location

Ovaripada is the elevated northern terminal metro station on the North-South corridor of the Red Line 7 of Mumbai Metro. This station is located in an elevated position on Western Express Highway in North Mumbai. This metro station was inaugurated on 2 April 2022 by Prime Minister Narendra Modi.

== Station layout ==
| 2nd Floor | Side platform |
| 2nd Floor | Platform 1 | towards Gundavali (Rashtriya Udyan) → |
| 2nd Floor | Platform 2 | ← Alighting only (Inter-corridor services through Dahisar (East) till Andheri (West)) |
| 2nd Floor | Side platform |
| 1st Floor | Mezzanine | Fare control, station agent, Metro QR ticket vending machines, crossover |
| Ground | Street level | Exit/Entrance |

=== Power and signaling system ===
Like all other stations and railways of Mumbai metro, Ovari Pada station also uses 25,000 volt AC power system by overhead catenary to operate the trains.

== Entry/Exits ==
Being on the side of WEH it has only 1 extry/exit. People wanting to go to nearby places like

- OvariPada
- Nancy Colony
- Ashok Van
- Dahisar Station (Western Line)

Can get down at this Metro Station. There is no public parking around this station, but auto-rickshaws & BEST Buses are available for commute.

== See also ==
- Mumbai
- List of Mumbai Metro stations
- Transport in Mumbai
- List of metro systems
- List of rapid transit systems in India
- M-Indicator
