= Mira-Bhayandar =

- City; Mumbai Metropolitan Region
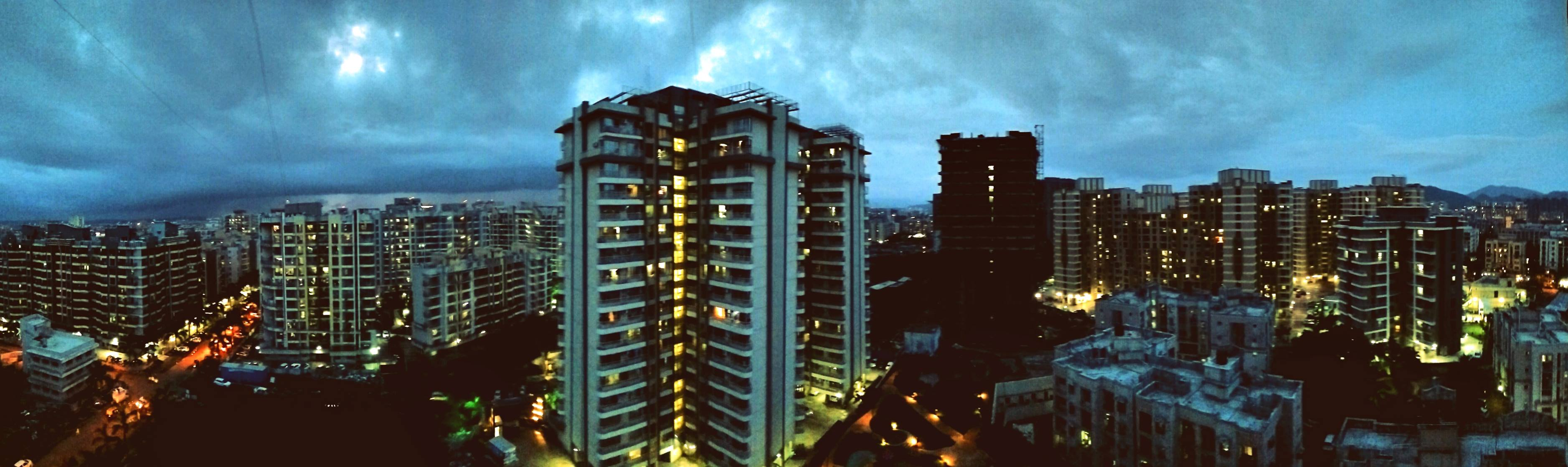
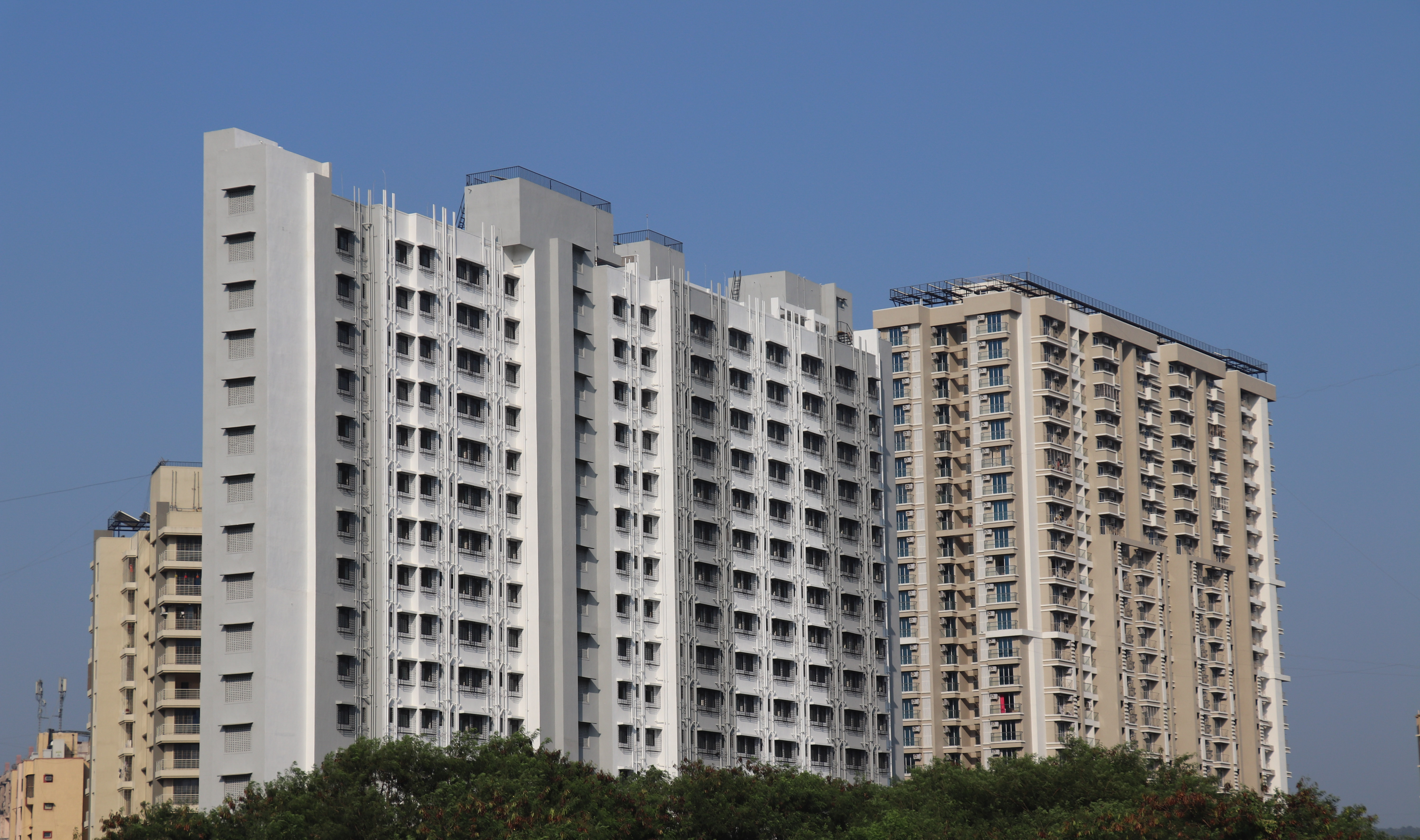
- High-rise residential apartments in Mira Road

- Location in Maharashtra, India Mira-Bhayandar (Maharashtra) Mira-Bhayandar (India)
- Coordinates: 19.29°N 72.85°E
- Country: India
- State: Maharashtra
- District: Thane

Government
  - Type: Municipal Corporation
  - Body: Mira-Bhayandar Municipal Corporation
  - Mayor: Dimple Mehta (BJP)
  - Deputy Mayor: Dhruvkishor Pati (BJP)
  - Municipal Commissioner: Radhabinod Aribam Sharma, IAS
  - Police Commissioner: Madhukar Pande, IPS

Area
  - Total: 79.4 km^{2} (30.7 sq mi)

Population (2011)
  - Total: 809,378
  - Density: 10,200/km^{2} (26,400/sq mi)

Language
  - Official: Marathi
- Time zone: UTC+5:30 (IST)
- PIN: 401107- For Mira Road & 401101- For Bhayandar(W) & 401105- For Bhayandar(E)
- Telephone code: 022
- Vehicle registration: MH-58
- Sex ratio: 1.22:1 ♂/♀
- Website: www.mbmc.gov.in

Mira-Bhayandar is a city and municipal corporation in Thane district in the state of Maharashtra, India located in the northern part of Salsette Island before the Vasai Creek, and shares a border with North Mumbai. Mira-Bhayandar is administered by Mira-Bhayandar Municipal Corporation (MBMC), with a population at the 2011 Census of 809,378. Mira-Bhayandar is a part of Mumbai Metropolitan Region (MMR) and Mira-Bhayander, Vasai-Virar (MBVV) Police Commissionerate.

As of April 2026, Mira-Bhayandar got its first metro opened. This is the first Metro line in Thane District. The Phase 1 of Mumbai Metro Line 9 has been opened from Dahisar (E) to Kashigaon. This phase consists of 4 stations spanning 4.7 km. The stations opened in this phase are:

1. Kashigaon metro station
2. Miragaon metro station [Interchange with Approved Metro Line 10]
3. Pandurang Wadi metro station
4. Dahisar East metro station [Interchange with Metro Line 2A]

== History ==
The Mira-Bhayandar Municipal Council was formed on 12 June 1985 by incorporating five Gram Panchayats. Later, on 23 January 1990, four more village panchayats—Raigad-Murdhe, Dongri, Uttan, and Versova—were included.

On 27 August 2022, after the five-year term of the elected municipal body concluded, the Mira-Bhayandar Municipal Corporation came under administrative rule. As of a result of a delay in conducting elections, due to legal challenges related to OBC reservation, Municipal Commissioner Dilip Dhole was appointed as the administrator

The MBMC is currently run by an administrator appointed by the State Government of Maharashtra.

== Demographics ==
Religions in Mira-Bhayandar (2011)
| Religion | Percent |
| Hinduism | 68.96% |
| Islam | 16.28% |
| Christianity | 6.01% |
| Jainism | 5.67% |
| Buddhism | 1.86% |
| Sikhism | 0.53% |
| Other or not stated | 0.68% |

Historical population
| Year | Pop. | ±% p.a. |
|---|---|---|
| 1951 | 6,327 | — |
| 1961 | 6,974 | +0.98% |
| 1971 | 10,598 | +4.27% |
| 1981 | 25,646 | +9.24% |
| 1991 | 175,605 | +21.21% |
| 2001 | 520,388 | +11.48% |
| 2011 | 809,378 | +4.52% |
Source: Government of India

The 2011 India census recorded a population of 809,378 in Mira-Bhayandar. According to the Indian Census data, the majority of the population are Hindus, followed by Muslims and Christians.

=== Language ===
Language in Mira-Bhayandar M. Corp (2011)
1. Hindi (29.1%)
2. Marathi (23.7%)
3. Gujarati (16.0%)
4. Urdu (7.91%)
5. Marwari (6.34%)
6. Bhojpuri (2.67%)
7. Bengali (2.48%)
8. Konkani (1.91%)
9. Kannada (1.58%)
10. Malayalam (1.41%)
11. Tulu (1.16%)
12. Punjabi (0.95%)
13. Others (4.83%)

Mira-Bhayandar has two dominant languages, with a large Marathi community residing in most of the suburbs of Northern Mumbai that stretches from Bhayander to Bandra, it is also shown in the linguistic demography of the suburb, while the official language, is also Marathi, is spoken by the natives of the land and migrants from other parts of Maharashtra with English as the main language of communication and in trade and commerce in the suburban region of Mumbai and Mumbai Metropolitan region, is spoken by most of the migrants as their native language. Marathi is the primary language spoken by the people living in the suburbs and metropolitan area of Mumbai.

== Economy ==
Economic growth is led by the manufacturing sector. Bhayandar is divided into two parts by the Mumbai suburban rail line - East and West. Mira Road has seen development only in the East part, while the West part, on the other side of the railway line, is covered with salt pans and mangroves. Mira Road East is a predominantly residential area. Its calm, quiet surroundings and low pollution make it a desirable residential oasis.

Bhayandar West was traditionally residential, and the East predominantly an industrial area in the field of steel utensils manufacturing. Recent population growth and a flurry of construction has blurred the boundaries between Bhayandar and neighboring Mira Road, on the East side of the rail tracks, turning it into a populous suburb. Government-owned Salt Pans and marshland in West Mira Road have restricted the southward spread of Bhayandar. There is a lot of scope for development of this land, as it has the potential to house a large industrial complex.

== Municipal finance ==
According to financial data published on the CityFinance Portal of the Ministry of Housing and Urban Affairs, the Mira-Bhayandar Municipal Corporation reported total revenue receipts of ₹1,200 crore (US$144 million) and total expenditure of ₹1,112 crore (US$134 million) in 2022–23. Tax revenue accounted for about 18.0% of the total revenue, while the corporation received ₹520 crore in grants during the financial year.

== Neighborhoods ==
The city of Mira-Bhayandar consists of two parts: Mira Road and Bhayandar, which are further subdivided into Mira Road East and Mira Road West and Bhayandar East and Bhayandar West.

- Indralok Phase 1
- Indralok Phase 2
- Indralok Phase 3
- Uttan
- Kashimira
- Navghar road
- Bhayandar West
- Mira Road East
- Naya Nagar
- Sheetal Nagar
- Shanti Nagar
- Kanakia
- Beverley
- Shivar Garden
- Queens Park
- Golden nest Phase 1 to 7
- Srishti
- Ramdev Park
- Medtiya Nagar
- Pleasant Park
- Vinay Park
- Penkarpada
- Gcc Club
- Mira gaon
- Bhayandar Flyover
- Bhayandar Khadi
- Jesal park
- Bhayandar railway Station
- Bhayandar Subway
- Bhayandar Creek Bridge
- Shanti Park
- Shanti Garden
- Silver Park
