= Pandurang Wadi metro station =

Mumbai Metro Red Line station in Mumbai

Pandurangwadi पांडुरंगवाडी

General information
- Location: Pandurang Wadi, Dahisar East; Mumbai, Maharashtra 400068; India
- Coordinates: 19°15′37″N 72°52′22″E
- Owner: Mumbai Metropolitan Region Development Authority
- Operator: Maha Mumbai Metro Operation Corporation Ltd.
- Line: Line 9
- Platforms: 2 side platforms
- Tracks: 2

Construction
- Structure type: Elevated
- Accessible: Yes

Other information
- Station code: 902

History
- Opened: 7 April 2026; 4 months ago
Services
Preceding station	Mumbai Metro	Following station
Miragaon towards Subhash Chandra Bose Stadium	Line 9	Dahisar (East) Terminus
Location

Pandurangwadi is an elevated metro station on the Red Line of the Mumbai Metro, located in Pandurangwadi, Dahisar, Mumbai, India. The station is owned by the Mumbai Metropolitan Region Development Authority (MMRDA) and was opened to the public on 7 April 2026 as part of Phase 1 of Line 9. At Dahisar (East), the next station southbound, passengers can interchange with the Yellow Line (Line 2A) for services toward Andheri West.

== History ==
The station was constructed by J Kumar Infraprojects as part of a ₹1,998 crore (US$210 million) contract awarded by MMRDA in September 2019 for the design and construction of Line 9 and Line 7A.

Pandurang Wadi was opened on 7 April 2026, when Phase 1 of Line 9 was inaugurated by Chief Minister Devendra Fadnavis along with Deputy Chief Ministers Eknath Shinde and Sunetra Pawar. Commercial services began on 8 April 2026.

=== Power and signalling system ===
Like all other stations on the Mumbai Metro, Pandurang Wadi uses a 25,000 volt AC power system by "overhead catenary" to operate the trains. The station uses the Alstom Urbalis 400 communications-based train control (CBTC) signalling system.
