= Red Line (Mumbai Metro) =

Metro line in Mumbai, India

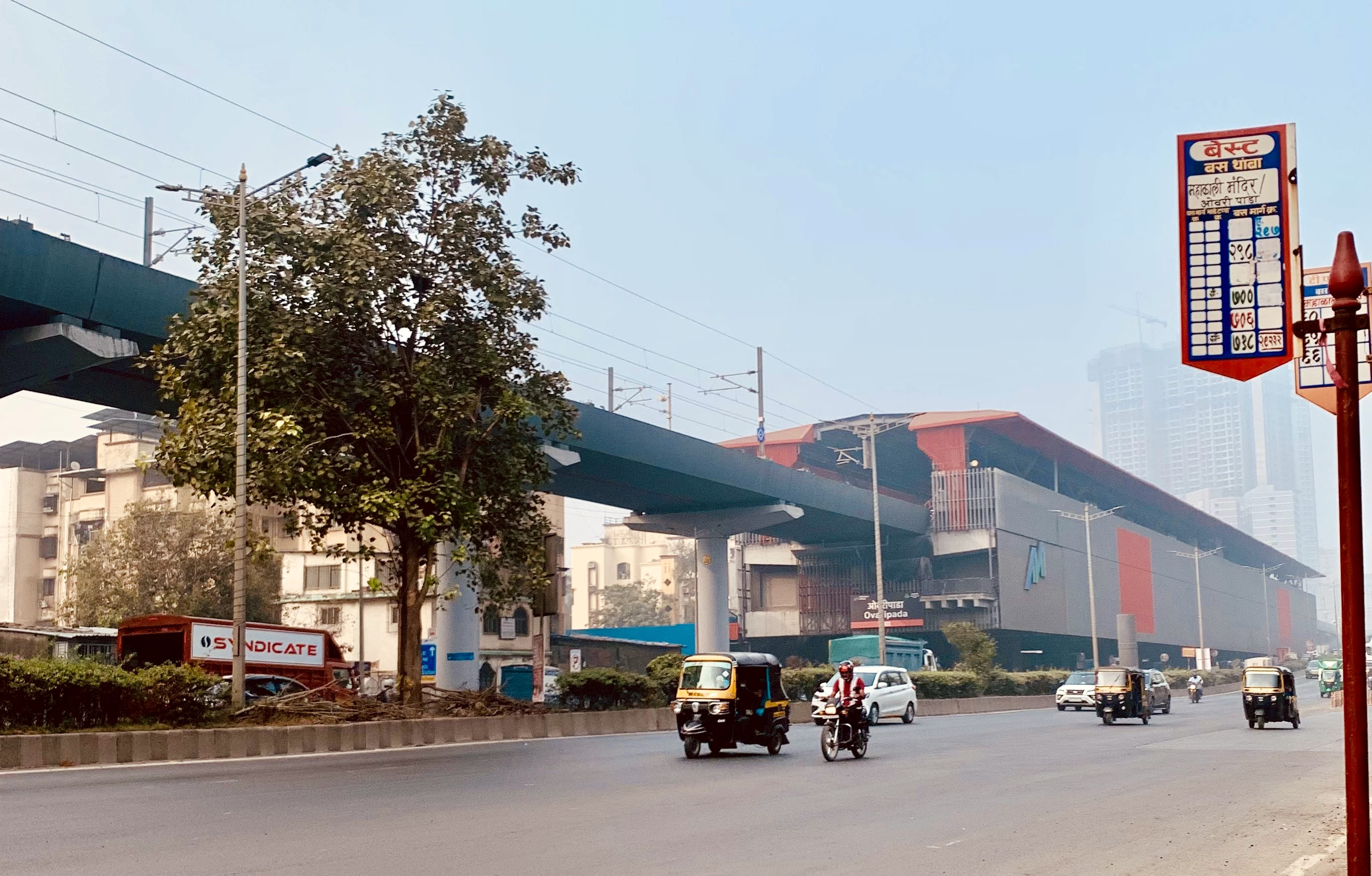
- Ovaripada metro station

Overview
- Status: Operational: Line 7 Partially operational: Line 9 Under construction: Line 7A
- Owner: MMRDA
- Line number: 7, 7A, 9
- Locale: Mumbai; Mira-Bhayander
- Termini: Kashigaon; Gundavali
- Connecting lines: Line 2A; Line 1; Pink Line (under construction); Line 3
- Stations: 21 (operational) / 23 (total)
- Website: https://www.mmmocl.co.in/

Service
- Type: Rapid transit
- System: Mumbai Metro
- Operator: Maha Mumbai Metro Operation Corp. Ltd. (MMMOCL)
- Depot: Charkop
- Rolling stock: BEML

History
- Opened: 2 April 2022

Technical
- Line length: 31.045 km (19.290 mi)
- Number of tracks: 2
- Character: Elevated and underground
- Track gauge: 1,435 mm (4 ft 8 1/2 in) standard gauge
- Electrification: 25 kV 50 Hz AC (overhead line)

The Red Line is part of the Mumbai Metro rail network for the city of Mumbai, Maharashtra, India. During construction, the line was divided into three smaller lines – Line 7 (Dahisar (East) to Gundavali), Line 7A (Gundavali to Chhatrapati Shivaji Maharaj International Airport - T2), and Line 9 (Subhash Chandra Bose Stadium to Dahisar (East)).

The 31.045 km corridor connects the region of Mira-Bhayandar to the Chhatrapati Shivaji Maharaj International Airport via Andheri (East) and Dahisar (East). Construction of Line 7 began in August 2016, while construction of Lines 7A and 9 began in March 2020. The majority of the corridor is elevated, with only the airport section being underground.

There are a total of 23 stations planned on the corridor, of which 21 are elevated and 1 is underground. The line offers interchange with:

- the Yellow Line at Dahisar (East)
- the Pink Line at Jogeshwari (East)
- the Blue Line at Gundavali
- the Aqua Line at Chhatrapati Shivaji Maharaj International Airport - T2

The line is also proposed to have interchanges with the Green Line and the Gold Line.

On 7 April 2026, the Red Line was extended northward into Mira-Bhayandar with the opening of Phase 1 of Line 9, covering three stations from Dahisar (East) to Kashigaon. Commercial services began on 8 April 2026.

Stations opened in this phase are:

1. Dahisar East metro station (Interchange with Metro Line 2A)
2. Pandurang Wadi metro station
3. Miragaon metro station (Interchange with approved Metro Line 10)
4. Kashigaon metro station

== Planning ==
Red Line
Line number	Station		Opening	Distance
Line number	From	To	Opening	Distance
9	Subhash Chandra Bose Stadium	Kashigaon	December 2027	11.38 km (7.07 mi)
9	Kashigaon	Dahisar (East)	8 April 2026	11.38 km (7.07 mi)
7	Dahisar (East)	Aarey	2 April 2022	16.495 km (10.250 mi)
7	Aarey	Gundavali	19 January 2023	16.495 km (10.250 mi)
7A	Gundavali	Chhatrapati Shivaji Maharaj International Airport - T2	December 2027	3.17 km (1.97 mi)
Total				31.045 km (19.290 mi)

=== Line 7 ===
An 18 km (11 mi) metro line connecting Andheri East and Dahisar East was proposed as Line 7 in the original Mumbai Metro master plan, unveiled by the Mumbai Metropolitan Region Development Authority (MMRDA) in 2004. In June 2015, the MMRDA proposed building Line 7 as part of a plan to build 6 new metro lines at a total estimated cost of ₹64,000 crore (US$6.6 billion). The MMRDA approved the detailed project report for Line 7 in August 2015. The report proposed a 16.5 km (10.3 mi) elevated line between Andheri East and Dahisar East at an estimated cost of ₹4,737 crore (US$490 million).

Over the course of two weeks in March–April 2017, Mumbai residents saved nearly 4,000 plants growing on dividers and along the Western Express Highway that had not been marked for replanting by metro authorities. Residents replanted these trees in their own housing societies, as well as at schools and other locations. Nearly 210 people and over 40 housing societies participated in the initiative, coordinating their efforts through WhatsApp messages.

In April 2017, the Ministry of Civil Aviation approved the transfer of 40 acres of land in Dahisar for the construction of the metro depot. The Airports Authority of India and the MMRDA signed a formal agreement on 24 April 2017. In June 2017, the Maharashtra Government transferred three plots of land at Aarey Colony, measuring a total of 20,387 sqm (5.03 acres), to the MMRDA for a labour camp and a casting yard for Line 7, and a centralised operation centre for the metro system. In November 2021, the MMRDA cancelled the plan to build the line's depot at Dahisar, and instead proposed building the depot for Line 7, and its extensions, at Rai Murdhe in Bhayandar.

In February 2020, MMRDA Metropolitan Commissioner R.A. Rajeev stated that Line 7 would be identified as the Red Line. A study by the World Resources Institute (WRI) India, published in May 2021, estimated that Line 7 and Line 2A had the potential to create 1.1 million jobs in the city.

=== Line 7A and 9 ===
In February 2017, the MMRDA announced that the DMRC was preparing a detailed project report (DPR) on a proposed 9 km (5.6 mi) extension of Line 7 from Dahisar to Bhayander, via Mira Road. The extension would have 9 stations, with an inter-station distance of 1 km (0.62 mi). The line would run parallel to the Surat-Dahisar Highway, then turn left at Kashi Mira Junction, before passing through Mira Road-Bhayander, and terminating at Golden Nest Circle in Bhayander. The project is estimated to cost ₹3,600 crore (US$370 million). In March 2017, the MMRDA stated that the DMRC was conducting a feasibility study to extend the line to Terminal 2 of the Chhatrapati Shivaji Maharaj International Airport.

The extensions to Mira-Bhayander and the airport were officially announced by Chief Minister Fadnavis on 30 March 2017. The alignment for the extension from Andheri to Chhatrapati Shivaji Maharaj International Terminus was approved by the State Cabinet on 12 April 2017. In June 2018, the MMRDA stated that it had decided to terminate the proposed extension at the international airport, and not extend it to the domestic terminal due to technical challenges. As the metro extension is proposed to be underground, it would have to be constructed below or above Line 3 which also passes under the airport. Line 7A is 3.42 km (2.13 mi) long including a 2.49 km (1.55 mi) underground twin tunnel. The extension is partially elevated, running parallel to the Western Express Highway and Sahar Elevated Road, and goes underground just ahead of the vehicular underpass of Sahar Elevated Road. The Maharashtra Cabinet approved the implementation of both extensions in September 2018.

== Construction ==
=== Line 7 ===
The Bhoomipujan ceremony for Line 7 was performed by Prime Minister Narendra Modi during his visit to Mumbai on 11 October 2015. Line 7 was implemented through the engineering, procurement, and construction (EPC) model. The MMRDA invited bids for the project in December 2015. Tendering for the design and construction of the corridor was split into 3 packages. The first package included an elevated viaduct and 5 elevated stations – Andheri East, Shankarwadi, JVLR Junction, Mahanand and new Ashok Nagar. The second package included an elevated viaduct and 6 elevated stations – Aarey, Dindoshi, Pathan Wadi, Pushpa Park, Bandongri and Mahindra & Mahindra, and an elevated viaduct and 5 elevated stations – Magathane, Devipada, National Park, Ovaripada and Dahisar East. A total of 16 companies expressed interest, and 9 bids were submitted. In April 2016, the MMRDA awarded contracts to Simplex Infrastructure, J Kumar Infraprojects, and Nagarjuna Construction Company for the first, second and third packages respectively. The project is estimated to cost ₹6,208 crore (US$640 million). The contract awarded to Simplex Infrastructure was worth ₹348 crore (US$36 million).

Construction work on the corridor began on 8 August 2016. The contractors were expected to complete construction of the corridor and all 14 stations within 30 months from the day of commencement of work. On 18 February 2017, MMRDA officials stated that 15% of piling, pile caps and pier work on the corridor had been completed. By the end of April 2017, 25% of piling work, 60% of barricading work and 77% of the soil testing for pier foundation had been completed. Line 7 stations were built on a single pier, unlike the three piers used to support stations on Line 1. The single pier design was chosen to facilitate the construction of smaller stations and reduce the amount of land occupied on the Western Express Highway which could obstruct traffic flow.

On 14 March 2017, the Mumbai High Court temporarily stayed all construction activities at Metro 7's casting yard in Bandra Reclamation. The Court was hearing a PIL filed by Mohammed Furqan Ali Mohammed Qureshi, who alleged that the site of the casting yard had been reserved by the Brihanmumbai Municipal Corporation (BMC) for use as a Sunni Muslim cemetery. Piling work in Kandivli resulted in a gas pipeline bursting on 29 March 2017. The damage to the Mahanagar Gas pipeline resulted in temporary disruptions in the supply of CNG to Kandivli, Borivli, Dahisar, Mira Road and Bhayander. Mahanagar Gas began repairing the pipeline on the evening of 31 March, and completed the work by the following evening. The BMC accused Nagarjuna Construction Company of illegally operating an unlicensed concrete ready mix plant at its casting yard in April 2017.

The MMRDA announced that construction of viaducts would begin in April 2017. The agency had completed construction of piers on several sections of the corridor, and the viaducts will be built at locations where pier caps have been built. The first viaduct was constructed in the section between JVLR and Mahanand. Construction of all pier caps along the corridor will be completed by the end of 2017. The first U-girder, the concrete structure on which metro tracks are laid, was launched near Pathanwadi Junction in Malad on 2 May 2017. In total, Metro 7 required 1,400 U-girders. Work on erecting the U-girders, as well as disposal and dumping of muck generated from underground work was done only between 11:30 pm and 6:00 am. During this period, multi-axle trailers transported U-girders weighing 170 tonne from the casting yard in Bandra to the location where it is to be erected. The trailer had to move slowly to avoid causing imbalance to the heavy load, which can result in toppling, and took roughly two hours to complete the journey. Lifting the girder and attaching it to the pier caps was also a difficult process and was carried out at night time. Traffic diversions were placed around the launching site to reduce the possibility of accidents. Officials erected an average of two girders every day.

The MMRDA issued notices to all three contractors working on the project on 11 August 2017 over the "poor progress" of work. The agency stated that although contractors were required to deploy 600 workers each, Simplex had only deployed 320, J Kumar Infraprojects had deployed 395, and NCC had deployed 318 labourers. The MMRDA had also issued a similar notice on 4 July 2017. By August 2017, about 600–700 metres of each package had been constructed, 63 piers and 22 girders had been erected, and barricades had been placed on 67% of the entire route. Track laying work on the line began in June 2019. The first escalator on Line 7 was installed at Bandongri station in August 2019.

In January 2020, the MMRDA terminated the contract awarded to Simplex Infrastructure for the first package over a delay in completing the work. The next month, the agency invited bids to replace Simplex. The work was split into two tenders, including one for a 6.25 km viaduct and another to complete work on four stations. In July 2020, the MMRDA awarded a ₹174.76 crore (US$18 million) and ₹127.78 crore (US$13 million) contract to J Kumar Infraprojects and Nagarjuna Construction Company respectively to complete the work. The MMRDA also encashed a bank guarantee of ₹35 crore (US$3.6 million) provided by Simplex. Simplex had completed around 75% of work at the time its contract was terminated.

MMRDA Metropolitan Commissioner R.A. Rajeev stated in September 2020 that almost 80% of construction work had been completed. The MMRDA began conducting pre-trials on the rolling stock at the Charkop depot in February 2021. The MMRDA announced that electrification of the line had been completed on 26 May, and the first trial runs were conducted from 31 May. The MMRDA began a dynamic test and trial run on the 20 km stretch between Dhanukarwadi and Aarey (including a portion of Line 2) on 19 June. The stretch between Dhanukarwadi and Aarey received provisional approval from the Research Designs and Standards Organisation (RDSO) in January 2022. The Commissioner of Metro Rail Safety (CMRS) began inspecting the line in February 2022.

A section of Line 7 from Dahisar East to Aarey (along with the section of Line 2 from Dhanukarwadi to Dahisar East) was opened on 2 April 2022. Chief Minister Uddhav Thackeray flagged off the first train at 4pm, in the presence of Deputy Chief Minister Ajit Pawar, Urban Development Minister Eknath Shinde, NCP chief Sharad Pawar, and the Leader of Opposition in the Legislative Council, Pravin Darekar. The line opened for public service from 8pm, with services operating between Aarey and Dhanukarwadi (on Line 2) via Dahisar East.

The remaining section of Line 7 from Goregaon East to Gundavali received approval from the RDSO in October 2022. The CMRS began inspecting the line in December 2022. The final section of the line (along with the final section of Line 2A from Dhanukarwadi to Andheri West) was inaugurated on 19 January 2023, by Prime Minister Narendra Modi.

=== Line 7A ===
Line 7A is a 3.42 km (2.13 mi) southward extension of Line 7 to Chhatrapati Shivaji Maharaj International Airport, with 2 stations. The section includes a 0.93 km (0.58 mi) elevated stretch and a 2.49 km (1.55 mi) long twin tunnels. The MMRDA awarded the construction contract to J. Kumar Infrastructure. Work on the extension began in March 2020. Around 25% of the work on the airport extension was completed by November 2022.

Tunneling work began on 1 September 2023. The twin tunnels are located at depths ranging between 6 metres and 20 metres, to ensure a smooth transition with the elevated section of the line. Two tunnel boring machines (TBM) were utilized to build the tunnels. Tunnelling work was completed in July 2025.

=== Line 9 ===
J Kumar Infraprojects received a letter of acceptance from the MMRDA for a contract worth Rs 1,998 crore. The company letter of acceptance (LoA) from Mumbai Metropolitan Region Development Authority (MMRDA) is for design and construction of elevated viaduct and nine elevated stations, including two flyovers, and twin tunnel, cut and cover, ramp and one underground station for corridor of Mumbai Metro Line 9 and 7A (extension of line 7 from Dahisar (East) To Mira-Bhayandar and Andheri to CSIA of Mumbai Metro Rail project of MMRDA). The announcement was made at 13 September 2019.

Phase 1 of Line 9, covering the 4.97 km (3.09 mi) stretch from Dahisar East to Kashigaon with three new stations (Pandurang Wadi, Miragaon, and Kashigaon), was inaugurated on 7 April 2026 by Chief Minister Devendra Fadnavis along with Deputy Chief Ministers Eknath Shinde and Sunetra Pawar. Commercial services began on 8 April 2026.{ The remaining stations on Line 9 (Sai Baba Nagar, Deepak Hospital (Medtiya Nagar), Shahid Bhagat Singh Garden, and Subhash Chandra Bose Stadium) are expected to open by December 2026.

== Stations ==
The Red Line has a total of 23 stations, Of the 23 stations 22 stations are elevated, while the station at Chhatrapati Shivaji Maharaj International Airport is underground. The station at Airport Colony has a lower height and design compared to other elevated stations, due to the Airport Authority of India's height restrictions near the airport.

Red Line
#	Station		Interchange	Opened	Alignment
#	English	Marathi	Interchange	Opened	Alignment
Line 9
1	Subhash Chandra Bose Stadium	सुभाषचंद्र बोस स्टेडियम		December 2026	Elevated
2	Shahid Bhagat Singh Garden	शहीद भगतसिंग गार्डन		December 2026	Elevated
3	Deepak Hospital (Medtiya Nagar)	दीपक हॉस्पिटल (मेडतिया नगर)		December 2026	Elevated
4	Sai Baba Nagar	साई बाबा नगर		December 2026	Elevated
5	Kashigaon	काशिगाव		8 April 2026	Elevated
6	Miragaon	मिरागाव	Green Line (proposed)	8 April 2026	Elevated
7	Pandurang Wadi	पांडुरंगवाडी		8 April 2026	Elevated
Line 7
8	Dahisar (East)	दहिसर (पूर्व)	Line 2A	2 April 2022	Elevated
9	Ovaripada	ओवरीपाडा		2 April 2022	Elevated
10	Rashtriya Udyan	राष्ट्रीय उद्यान		2 April 2022	Elevated
11	Devipada	देवीपाडा		2 April 2022	Elevated
12	Magathane	मागाठाणे		2 April 2022	Elevated
13	Poisar	पोईसर		2 April 2022	Elevated
14	Akurli	आकुर्ली		2 April 2022	Elevated
15	Kurar	कुरार		2 April 2022	Elevated
16	Dindoshi	दिंडोशी		2 April 2022	Elevated
17	Aarey	आरे		2 April 2022	Elevated
18	Goregaon (East)	गोरेगाव (पूर्व)		19 January 2023	Elevated
19	Jogeshwari (East)	जोगेश्वरी (पूर्व)	Pink Line (under construction)	19 January 2023	Elevated
20	Mogra	मोगरा		19 January 2023	Elevated
21	Gundavali	गुंदवली	Blue Line	19 January 2023	Elevated
Line 7A
22	Airport Colony	विमानतळ वसाहत		December 2026	Elevated
23	Chhatrapati Shivaji Maharaj International Airport - T2	छत्रपती शिवाजी महाराज आंतरराष्ट्रीय विमानतळ - टी२	Aqua Line; Gold Line (proposed) CSMIA (T-2)	December 2026	Underground

== Cost ==
=== Line 7 ===
Line 7 is estimated to cost ₹6,208 crore (US$640 million). The Asian Development Bank (ADB) will provide 43-48% of the total project cost through a loan at an interest rate of 1.4%. The Government of Maharashtra is the guarantor for the loan. On 2 March 2019, the Union Ministry of Finance stated that it had signed a $926 million loan agreement with the ADB to fund the construction of Line 2 and Line 7. This was the single largest infrastructure loan ever extended by the ADB. The funds will be used to procure 63 six-car trainsets, and signaling and safety systems on both corridors.

The proposed extension of Line 7 from Dahisar to Bhayander (called Line 9) is estimated to cost ₹3,600 crore (US$370 million), and the underground extension to the International Airport shall cost an additional ₹600 crore (US$62 million).

The MMRDA allotted ₹340 crore (US$35 million) to the DMRC to implement and commission the rolling stock, signalling, and telecommunication work for the Metro 2A and Metro 7 corridors on 26 November 2016.

== Infrastructure ==
=== Rolling stock ===
BEML was awarded a ₹3,015 crore (US$310 million) contract to supply 378 metro cars (63 trainsets) for Line 7 and Line 2 in November 2018. An additional 126 metro cars (21 trainsets) were ordered from BEML to cater to metro extensions. All trainsets were manufactured at BEML's Rail Coach Factory in Bangalore, Karnataka. The rakes are capable of driverless operation, making them the first driverless metro trains to be made in India. BEML began manufacturing the coaches on 29 July 2019, built the first metro coach in 75 days, and unveiled it in September 2019. The first trainset arrived in Mumbai on 28 January 2021.

Each trainset is made up of six coaches, with a total passenger capacity of 1,660 and a dense crush load capacity of 2,092. The trainset is 3.2 metres wide and made of stainless steel. Each coach has four doors on both sides. The rake employs a regenerative braking system.

=== Signalling ===
Line 7 utilises the Alstom Urbalis 400 communications-based train control (CBTC) signalling system. Alstom was awarded a EUR 90 million contract to supply the signalling and telecommunications systems for Mumbai Metro Line 2 and Line 7, as well as Pune Metro's Purple Line and Aqua Line, in April 2019.

=== Power ===
Line 7 is electrified at 25 kV 50 Hz AC, with power provided via an overhead catenary. The MMRDA signed an agreement with Adani Electricity Mumbai Limited to supply electricity to Line 7 and Line 2A on 2 December 2022. Around 120 million units are required to power both lines. MMRDA plans to install solar panels on the roofs of 13 stations on Line 7 to generate 2,000 kW of power.

=== Fare collection ===
A consortium of the Indian company Datamatics Business Solutions and Italian company AEP Ticketing Solutions S.R.L was awarded a ₹160 crore (US$17 million) contract to implement the automated fare collection system for Line 7 and Line 2 in February 2019.

From 1 May 2023, a 25% discount on ticket fare was implemented for senior citizens (over 65 years), disabled persons, and students up to Class 12.

=== Foot overbridges ===
The MMRDA plans to build 14 foot-overbridges on the Red Line to improve connectivity for commuters. The overbridges will be constructed in three phases. The first foot overbridge at Gundavali station was completed on 29 November 2022.
