= Kashigaon metro station =

Mumbai Metro Red Line station in Mira-Bhayandar

Kashigaon

General information
- Location: Kashigaon, Mira Road East; Mira-Bhayandar, Maharashtra 401107; India
- Coordinates: 19°16′38″N 72°52′51″E
- Owner: Mumbai Metropolitan Region Development Authority
- Operator: Maha Mumbai Metro Operation Corporation Ltd.
- Line: Line 9
- Platforms: 2 side platforms
- Tracks: 2

Construction
- Structure type: Elevated
- Accessible: Yes

Other information
- Station code: 904

History
- Opened: Phase One:7 April 2026; 5 months ago
Services
Preceding station	Mumbai Metro	Following station
Terminus	Line 9	Miragaon towards Dahisar (East)
Location

Kashigaon is an elevated metro station on the Red Line of the Mumbai Metro, located in Kashigaon, Mira-Bhayandar, Maharashtra, India. The station is owned by the Mumbai Metropolitan Region Development Authority (MMRDA) and was opened to the public on 7 April 2026 as part of Phase 1 of Line 9. It currently serves as the northern terminus of the Red Line, with services running through to Gundavali in Andheri East via Dahisar (East). The station is located approximately 1.4 km east of Mira Road railway station on the Western Line.

== History ==
The station was constructed by J Kumar Infraprojects as part of a ₹1,998 crore (US$210 million) contract awarded by MMRDA in September 2019 for the design and construction of Line 9 and Line 7A. The foundation stone for Line 9 was laid by Prime Minister Narendra Modi on 18 December 2018.

Kashigaon was opened on 7 April 2026, when Phase 1 of Line 9 was inaugurated by Chief Minister Devendra Fadnavis along with Deputy Chief Ministers Eknath Shinde and Sunetra Pawar. Commercial services began on 8 April 2026. The first passenger to travel from Kashigaon was Girish Bawaskar, a resident of Mira Road.

=== Power and signalling system ===
Like all other stations on the Mumbai Metro, Kashigaon uses a 25,000 volt AC power system by "overhead catenary" to operate the trains. The station uses the Alstom Urbalis 400 communications-based train control (CBTC) signalling system.
