= Mumbai Metro =

Rapid transit system in Mumbai, India

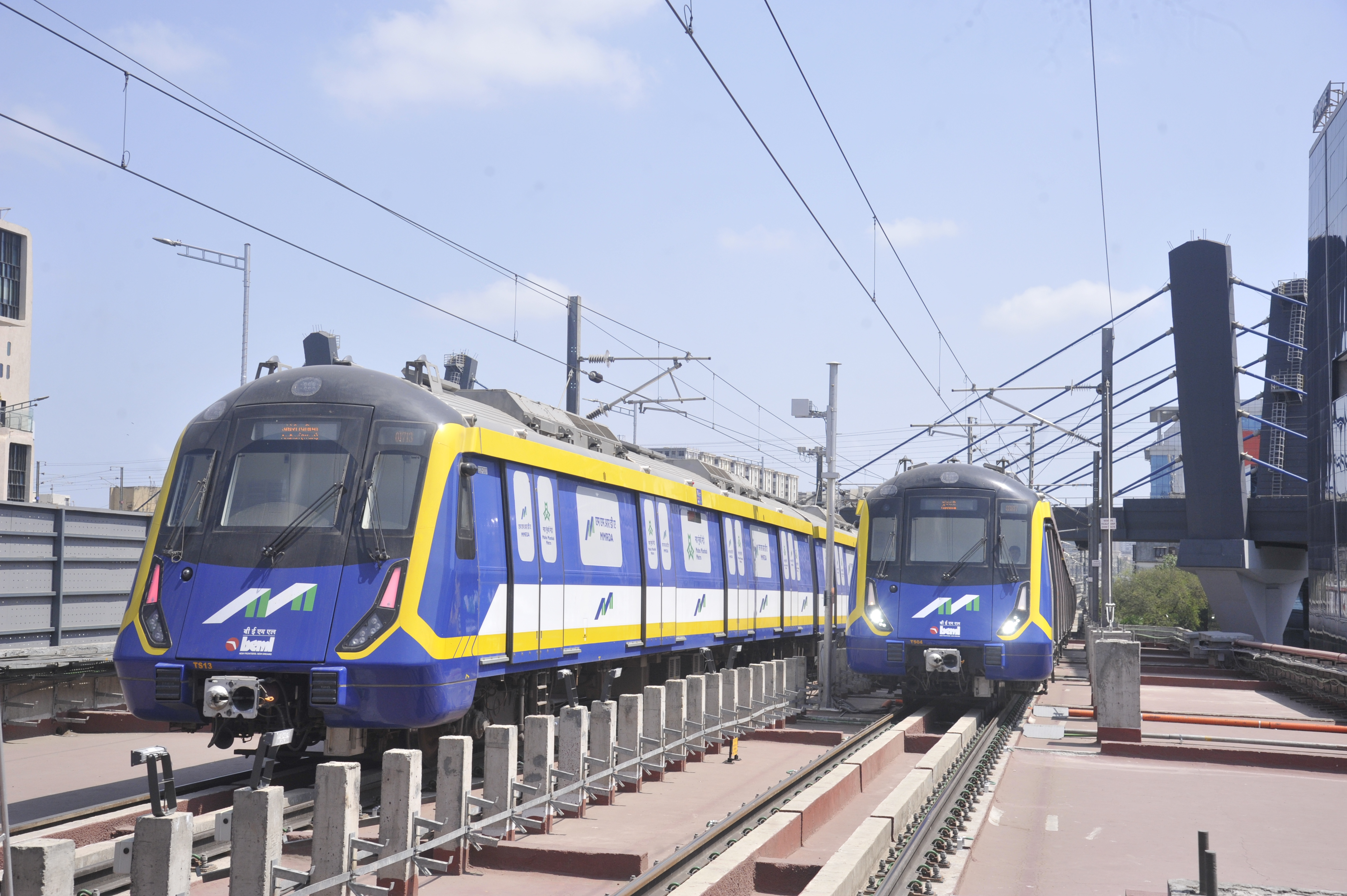
- BEML rakes at Gundavali

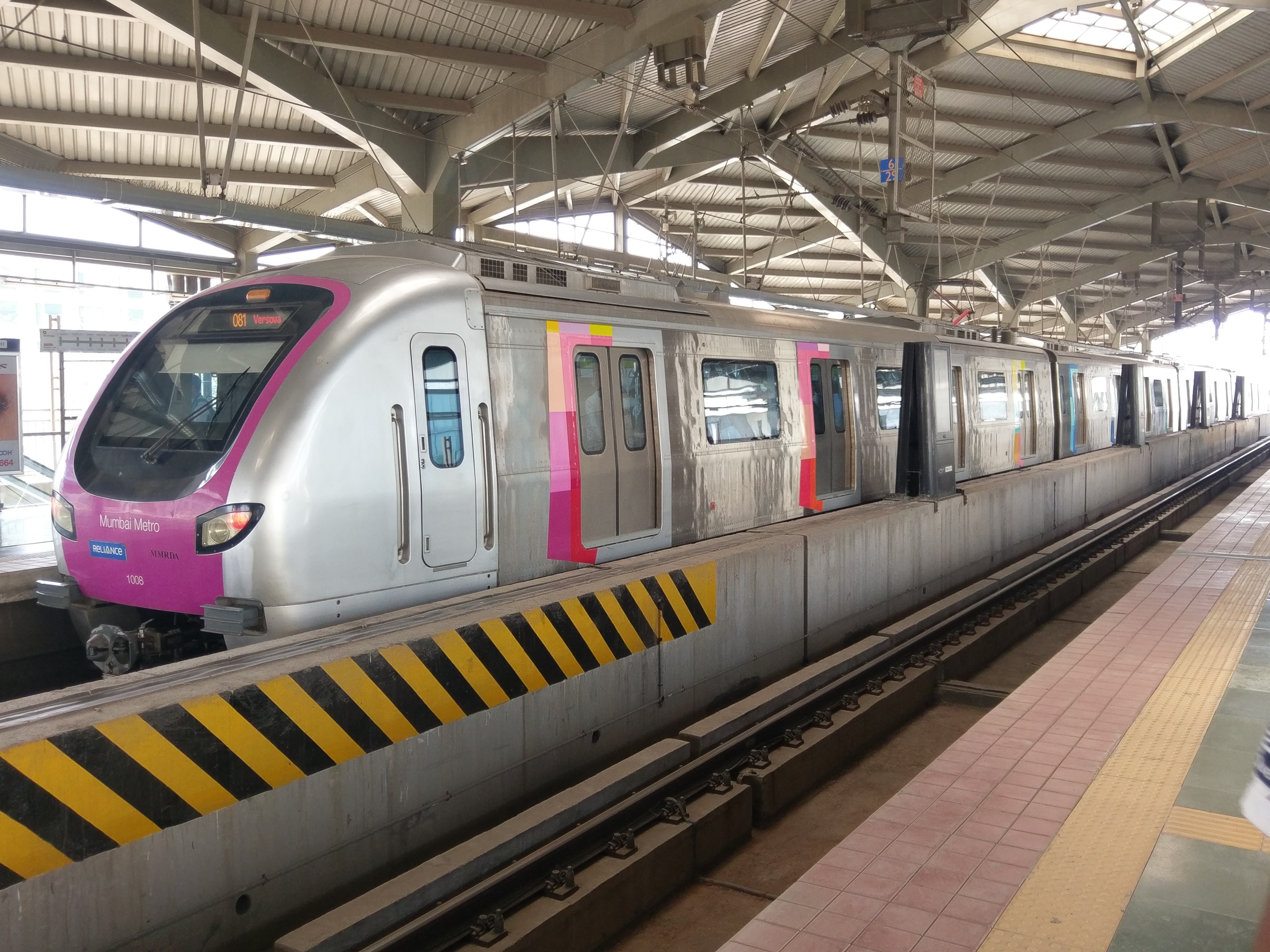
- CRRC Puzhen rake on Line 1

Overview
- Owner: Mumbai Metropolitan Region Development Authority (Note: MMRDA, through its subsidiary MMMOCL, owns most of Mumbai Metro's elevated corridors, including the Yellow Lines 2A/2B, Red Lines 7/9, and the future Green Lines 4/4A/10, Orange Lines 5/12, Pink Line 6, Gold Line 8, Purple Line 13, and Magenta Line 14. Blue Line 1 is owned by MMOPL, a Reliance–MMRDA joint venture, under a public–private partnership (PPP) model. Meanwhile, MMRCL is responsible for constructing and operating the fully underground Aqua Line 3 and the future underground Green Line 11.)
- Area served: Mumbai Metropolitan Region
- Locale: Mumbai
- Transit type: Rapid Transit
- Number of lines: Operational: 4; Partially Operational: 2; Under-construction: 5; Proposed: 5
- Line number: Operational: Line 1; Line 2A; Line 3; Line 7; Partially Operational: Line 2B; Line 9; Under Construction: Line 4A; Line 4; Line 5; Line 6; Line 7A; Line 12; Proposed: Line 8; Line 10; Line 11; Line 13; Line 14
- Number of stations: 77 (Note: Interchange stations are counted only once. There are 2 interchange stations. If added the number goes up to 79 stations)
- Daily ridership: 10.57 lakh (1.05 million, 2025-26)
- Annual ridership: 27.3 crore (273 million, 2024-25)
- Chief executive: S.V.R Srinivas, CMD & Metropolitan Commissioner
- Headquarters: NaMMTRI Building, Plot No. R-13, E-Block, Bandra Kurla Complex, Bandra (E), Mumbai, Maharashtra 400051.
- Website: MMMOCL; MMRDA

Operation
- Began operation: 8 June 2014; 12 years ago
- Operator: Maha Mumbai Metro Operation Corporation Ltd (Note: MMRDA, through its subsidiary MMMOCL, operates most elevated corridors. Blue Line 1 is operated by MMOPL, a Reliance–MMRDA joint venture under a public–private partnership (PPP), while Aqua Line 3 is owned by MMRCL and operated by the Delhi Metro Rail Corporation (DMRC))
- Character: Elevated (Blue, Yellow, Red lines); Underground and At-Grade (Aqua line)
- Train length: 4 coaches (Blue line); 6 coaches (Yellow, Red lines); 8 coaches (Aqua line)
- Headway: 4 minutes (peak hours); 8 minutes (off-peak hours)

Technical
- System length: 91.48 km (56.84 mi) (Operational); 121.54 km (75.52 mi) (Under Construction); 138.92 km (86.32 mi) (Approved & Proposed)
- Track gauge: 1,435 mm (4 ft 8 1/2 in) standard gauge
- Electrification: 25 kV 50 Hz AC Overhead line
- Top speed: 80 km/h (50 mph)
System map

The Mumbai Metro is a rapid transit train system serving the city of Mumbai and the wider Mumbai Metropolitan Region in Maharashtra, India. The system consists of 4 colour-coded lines serving 77 stations with a length of 91.48 km (56.84 mi) as of April 2026. It is India's third largest and third busiest metro system. The metro has a mix of underground, at-grade, and elevated stations using standard-gauge tracks.

The rapid transit metro system is designed to reduce traffic congestion in the city and supplement the overcrowded Mumbai Suburban Railway network. When completed, the core system will comprise sixteen high-capacity metro railway lines, spanning a total of more than 523 kilometres (325.0 mi) (25% underground, the rest elevated, with a minuscule portion built at-grade) and serviced by 350 stations.

Construction work began in February 2008, and the Blue Line, the system's first, commenced operations on 8 June 2014. Many lines were subsequently delayed because of late environmental clearances, land acquisition troubles, and protests. Sections of 2A and 7 were inaugurated on 2 April 2022. A section of the Aqua Line was inaugurated on 5 October 2024 and a year later the line became fully operational. On 7 April 2026, sections of 9 and 2B were inaugurated. Additionally, there are 8 other metro lines currently under construction in the city.

Three separate agencies are responsible for Mumbai Metro's operations: Line 1 is operated by Mumbai Metro One Private Limited (MMOPL), a joint venture between Reliance Infrastructure (74%), the Mumbai Metropolitan Region Development Authority (26%) and formerly by RATP Dev Transdev Asia (5%). The completely underground lines 3 and 11 will be built by Mumbai Metro Railway Corporation Ltd (MMRC). The rest of the system, consisting of lines 2, 4, 5, 6, 7 and their extensions are being built by the Mumbai Metropolitan Region Development Authority (MMRDA) and operated by the Maha Mumbai Metro Operations Corporation Limited (MMMOCL). While the Maharashtra Metro Rail Corporation Limited (Maha Metro) is responsible for all metro rail projects being developed in the rest of Maharashtra, the Mumbai Metropolitan Region Development Authority is the authority responsible for maintaining the metro system in the Greater Mumbai area.

== History ==
Being the capital of Maharashtra, Mumbai is among the largest cities in the world, with a total metropolitan area population of over 2 crore (20 million) as of 2011, and a population growth rate of around 2% per annum. Mumbai has the advantage of a high modal share of the public (88%) in favour of a public mass transport system. The existing Mumbai Suburban Railway carries over 70 lakh (7 million) passengers per day, and is supplemented by the Brihanmumbai Electric Supply and Transport (BEST) bus system, which provides feeder services to station-going passengers to allow them to complete their journeys. Until the 1980s, transport in Mumbai was not a big problem. The discontinuation of trams resulted in a direct increase in passenger pressure on the suburban railway network. By 2010, the population of Mumbai had doubled. However, due to the city's geographical constraints and rapid population growth, road and rail infrastructure development has not been able to keep pace with the growing demand over the last 4-5 decades. Moreover, the Mumbai Suburban Railway, though extensive, is not built to rapid transit specifications. The main objective of the Mumbai Metro is to provide mass rapid transit services to people within an approach distance of between 1 and 2 kilometres (0.62 and 1.24 mi), and to serve the areas not connected by the existing Suburban Rail network. The master plan unveiled by the MMRDA in 2004 encompassed a total of 146.5 kilometres (91.03 mi) of track, of which 32 kilometres (19.88 mi) would be underground. The Mumbai Metro was proposed to be built in three phases, at an estimated cost of ₹19,525 crore. In September 2009, the proposed Hutatma Chowk – Ghatkopar was reduced to a line between Hutatma Chowk and Carnac Bunder.

In 2011, the MMRDA unveiled plans for an extended Colaba-Bandra-SEEPZ metro line. According to its earlier plans, a 20 km (12.43 mi) Colaba-to-Bandra metro line was to be constructed, running underground for 10 kilometres (6.21 mi) from Colaba to Mahalaxmi, and then on an elevated track from Mahalaxmi to Bandra. However, the MMRDA decided to increase the ridership on the line by running it out past Bandra to Chhatrapati Shivaji Maharaj International Airport. The 33.5-kilometre (20.82 mi) Colaba-Bandra-SEEPZ line will be built at a cost of ₹21,000 crore (US$2.2 billion), and will be the city's first underground metro line. It will have 27 stations.

On 27 February 2012, the Union Government gave in-principle approval to the plan for Line 3. Money for the project is being borrowed from Japanese International Cooperation Agency (50%), the state government (16%), the central government (14%), and others. In April 2012, the MMRDA announced plans to grant the Mumbai Metro Rail Company increased management autonomy, in an effort to enhance the project's operational efficiency. In July 2012, the MMRDA announced plans to add more metro lines to its existing plan, including a line parallel to the Western Express Highway from Bandra to Dahisar. This line is expected to reduce the passenger load on the Western Line and vehicle traffic on the highway. Another proposed route, the 30-kilometre (18.64 mi), 28-station Wadala–Kasarvadavali line, received in-principle approval from the state government in 2013. The MMRDA also intends to convert the proposed Lokhandwala–SEEPZ–Kanjurmarg monorail route into a metro line. The Mumbai Metro master plan was revised by the MMRDA in 2012, increasing the total length of the proposed network to 160.90 km (99.98 mi). In June 2015, two new lines were proposed. A line from Andheri West to Dahisar West, and a line from BKC to Mankhurd.

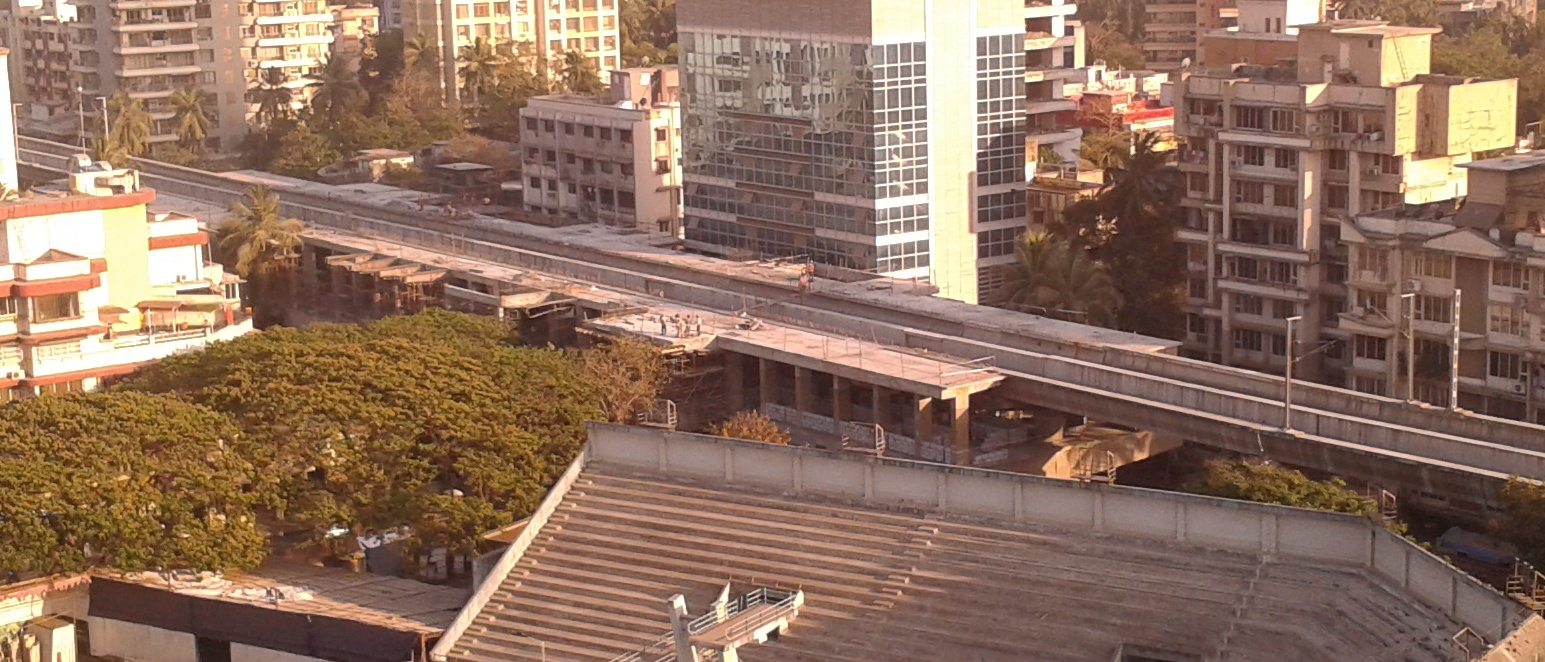
A metro station under construction in Andheri in March 2012

On 18 February 2013, the MMRDA signed a memorandum of understanding with Transport for London, the transit authority in Greater London. The arrangement will facilitate the exchange of information, personnel and technology in the transportation sector.

The revised Mumbai Metro master plan had proposed a line along the Thane-Teen Haath Naka-Kapurbavadi-Ghodbunder Road route. The feasibility report concluded that the line was not feasible as most residents of Thane and its neighbouring areas travelled to Mumbai for work daily. On 14 June 2014, Chavan announced that the MMRDA was instead examining a proposal for a metro line along the new proposed route of Wadala-Ghatkopar-Teen Haat Naka route. RITES will prepare the detailed project report and is expected to submit it by August 2014. The preliminary report proposed a 32 km (19.88 mi) line with 29 stations, to be built at an estimated cost of ₹22,000 crore. This would be the fourth line of the metro, after the previously proposed Charkop-Dahisar route was merged with the Charkop-Bandra-Mankhurd route to form Line 2.

In May 2015, the MMRDA said that it had begun planning for the Andheri-Dahisar line and Seepz-Kanjurmarg. Both lines are expected to be elevated, although the latter could be constructed underground if a proposal to extend Line 3 to Kanjurmarg is undertaken. DPRs for both lines had been prepared in 2004, along with the master plan, and the MMRDA would now update the DPRs. The agency also intends to construct Line 9 of the metro as an underground corridor from Sewri to Worli. However, planning for the project will only begin after the construction of the proposed Mumbai Trans Harbour Link commences.

In a report on 14 November 2014 about the cancellation of the PPP agreement for Line 2, Mint quoted a senior MMRDA official: "as decided earlier, all future lines of Mumbai Metro will be constructed by the Mumbai Metro Railway Corp. Ltd (MMRCL), a joint venture between the state government and the Union government." On 20 May 2015, Chief Minister Devendra Fadnavis requested officials to consider constructing the Charkop-Bandra-Dahisar and the Wadala-Thane-Kasarvadavali lines as elevated corridors. Although both corridors had been planned as elevated lines in the Mumbai Metro master plan, the previous Congress-NCP had decided to construct all metro lines underground, after delays and difficulties caused by acquiring land for Line 1. However, Fadnavis believes that the two proposed lines can be constructed more quickly and cheaply if they were elevated due to the proposed route of the alignment. The Government plans to implement all future metro lines (except Line 3) as elevated corridors. On 15 June 2015, the MMRDA announced that it would implement Line 2 of the metro in three parts. The Andheri-Dahisar line will have connectivity with the existing Line 1 and the proposed JVLR-Kanjurmarg line.

In June 2015, Fadnavis announced that he would request the Delhi Metro Rail Corporation (DMRC) to assist in the implementation of the Mumbai Metro. He said that he intends to expand the metro system by 109 km (67.73 mi) before the state assembly elections in October 2019. In July 2015, UPS Madan announced that the State Government formally appointed the DMRC to revise and update the Mumbai Metro master plan. The DMRC will prepare DPRs for the Andheri East to Dahisar East, Jogeshwari to Kanjurmarg, Andheri West to Dahisar West and Bandra Kurla Complex to Mankhurd lines. The Andheri-Dahisar line will have connectivity with the existing Line 1 and the proposed JVLR-Kanjurmarg line. All four lines are proposed to be elevated and constructed as cash contracts. The lines are estimated to cost a total of ₹21,000 crore (US$2.2 billion), or about ₹350 crore (US$37 million) per km. In addition, the planned Line 3 and Wadala-Ghatkopar-Thane-Kasarvadavli line of the metro would also be constructed.

Fadnavis announced on 8 April 2017 that the government was considering a circular metro loop line along the Kalyan-Dombivli-Taloja route. The proposed 15 km (9.32 mi) line would link Kalyan and Shil Phata with 13 stations, bring metro connectivity to Kalyan (East), Dombivli, Ambarnath and Diva.

The Mumbai Metro resumed services for general public on 19 October 2020, after being shut down since March 2020 due to the COVID-19 pandemic.

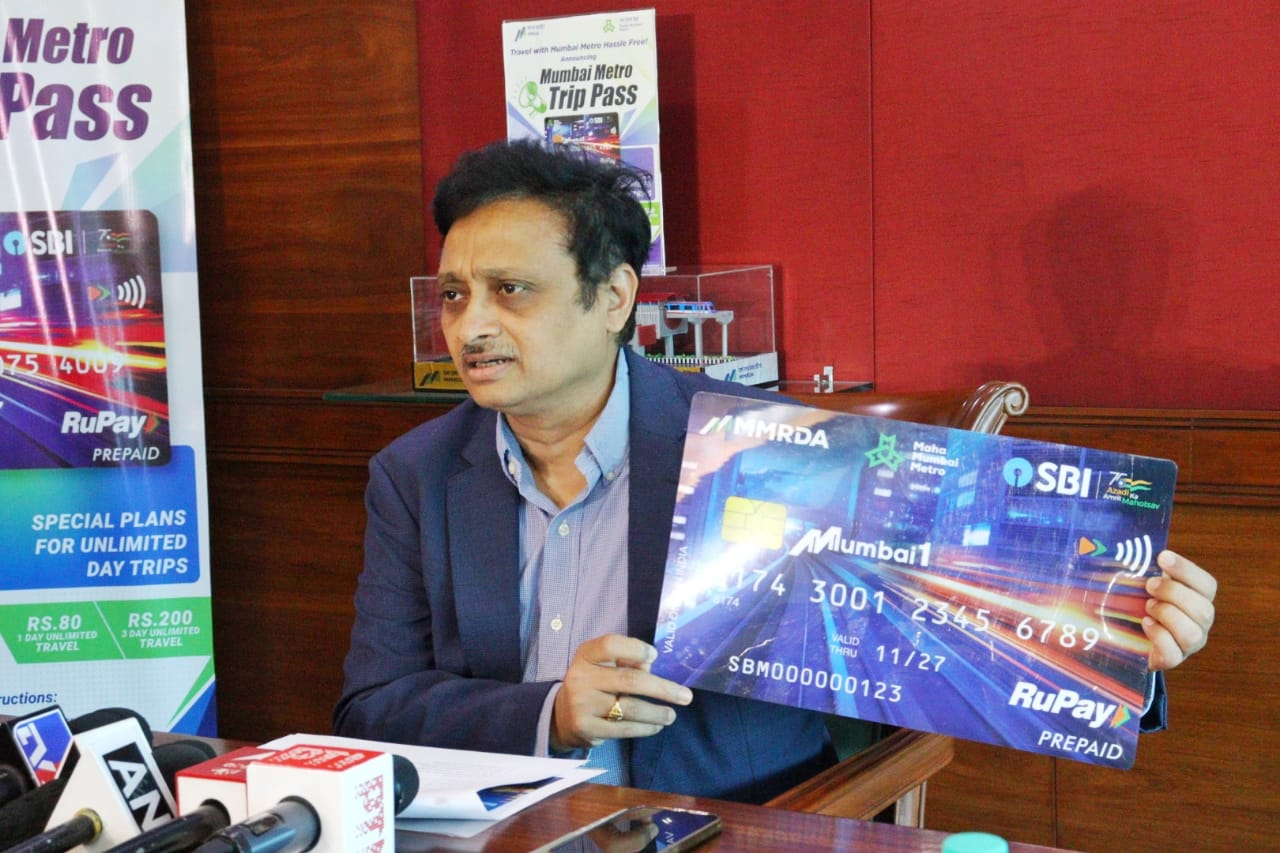
Metro passes were included with the Mumbai 1 card introduced in 2021

=== Protests and delay ===
The project has faced significant and costly legal challenges. In 2018, protestors rallied to protect trees that were to be chopped down as part of construction plans. The central government first proposed the construction of a metro station at Aarey Milk colony. The protest resulted in several arrests. Protests again flared in 2022.

== Construction ==
Lines on the Mumbai Metro are identified both by colours and numbers. Unlike most rapid transit systems where each line has a dedicated colour and number, in the Mumbai Metro a single line can have one colour but several numbers. For example, the "Green Line" consists of four different numbers: Line 4 (the primary route from Kasarvadavali to Wadala), Line 4A (an extension from Kasarvadavali to Gaimukh), Line 10 (a further extention from Gaimukh to Mira Road) and Line 11 (an extension from Wadala to CSMT). These numbers represent different sections of a single route, with services planned to run through the entire route; thereby connecting the numbered sections together.

Operational Lines
No.	Line Name	Number	Terminals		Stations	Length	Opening Date
1	Blue	1	Versova	Ghatkopar	12	11.40 km (7.08 mi)	8 June 2014
2	Yellow	2A	Dahisar (East)	Dahanukarwadi	9	9.8 km (6.1 mi)	2 April 2022
2	Yellow	2A	Dahanukarwadi	Andheri (West)	8	8.8 km (5.5 mi)	19 January 2023
2	Yellow	2B	Chembur	Diamond Garden	1	1.3 km (0.81 mi)	13 August 2026
2	Yellow	2B	Diamond Garden	Mandale	5	5.53 km (3.44 mi)	8 April 2026
3	Aqua	3	Aarey JVLR	Bandra Kurla Complex	10	12.69 km (7.89 mi)	7 October 2024
3	Aqua	3	Bandra Kurla Complex	Acharya Atre Chowk	6	9.77 km (6.07 mi)	10 May 2025
3	Aqua	3	Acharya Atre Chowk	Cuffe Parade	11	10.99 km (6.83 mi)	9 October 2025
4	Red	7	Dahisar (East)	Aarey	10	10.7 km (6.6 mi)	2 April 2022
4	Red	7	Aarey	Gundavali	4	5.8 km (3.6 mi)	19 January 2023
4	Red	9	Kashigaon	Dahisar (East)	3	4.7 km (2.9 mi)	8 April 2026
Total					79	91.48 km (56.84 mi)	
Under Construction Lines
No.	Line Name	Number	Terminals		Stations	Length	Opening Date
1	Yellow	2B	Andheri (West)	Saraswat Nagar	6	16.8 km (10.4 mi)	December 2028
1	Yellow	2B	Saraswat Nagar	Chembur	8	16.8 km (10.4 mi)	December 2028
2	Green	4A	Gaimukh	Kasarvadavali	2	2.88 km (1.79 mi)	December 2028
2	Green	4	Kasarvadavali	Cadbury Junction	8	32.32 km (20.08 mi)	December 2028
2	Green	4	Cadbury Junction	Gandhi Nagar (Kanjurmarg)	11	32.32 km (20.08 mi)	December 2028
2	Green	4	Gandhi Nagar (Kanjurmarg)	Bhakti Park (Wadala)	13	32.32 km (20.08 mi)	December 2028
3	Orange	5	Kapurbawdi	Bhiwandi	8	12.81 km (7.96 mi)	December 2028
3	Orange	12	Kalyan APMC	Taloja	17	20.75 km (12.89 mi)	December 2032
4	Pink	6	Swami Samarth Nagar (Lokhandwala)	Vikhroli EEH	13	14.47 km (8.99 mi)	December 2028
5	Red	7A	Gundavali	Chhatrapati Shivaji Maharaj International Airport - T2	2	3.17 km (1.97 mi)	March 2028
5	Red	9	Subhash Chandra Bose Stadium	Kashigaon	4	4.3 km (2.7 mi)	December 2026
Total					101	108.78 km (67.59 mi)	
Proposed Lines
No.	Line Name	Number	Terminals		Stations	Length	Opening Date
1	Green	10	Gaimukh	Shivaji Chowk (Mira Road)	8	9.2 km (5.7 mi)	State Approved
1	Green	11	Bhakti Park (Wadala)	Chhatrapati Shivaji Maharaj Terminus	15	18 km (11 mi)	State Approved
2	Orange	5	Bhiwandi	Durgadi	6	10.48 km (6.51 mi)	Centre Approved
2	Orange	5A	Kalyan APMC	Durgadi	7	11.83 km (7.35 mi)	Centre Approved
2	Orange	5A	Ulhasnagar	Durgadi	7	11.83 km (7.35 mi)	Centre Approved
2	Orange	12A	Manpada–Katai Naka	Taloja	12	18.40 km (11.43 mi)	State Approved
3	Gold	8	Chhatrapati Shivaji Maharaj International Airport - T2	Navi Mumbai International Airport	20	35 km (22 mi)	Centre Approved
4	Purple	13	Subhash Chandra Bose Stadium	Virar	20	23 km (14 mi)	State Approved
5	Magenta	14	Vikhroli EEH	Badlapur	40	45 km (28 mi)	DPR submitted
Total					112	140.92 km (87.56 mi)	

== Lines ==
=== Blue Line (Line 1) ===
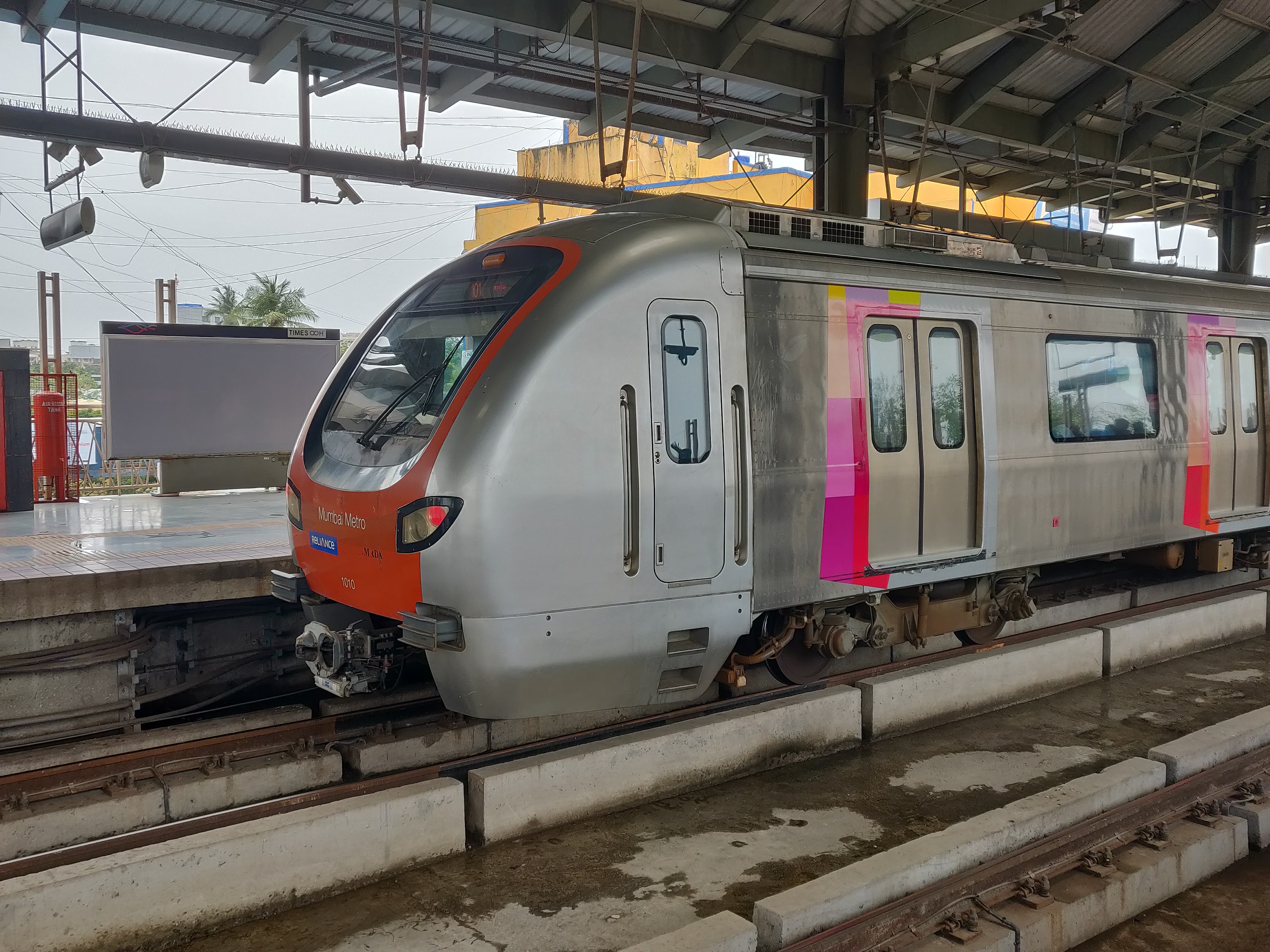
A Blue Line CRRC Puzhen trainset approaching Andheri station in 2019

The Blue Line connects Versova in the Western Suburbs to Ghatkopar in the Central Suburbs, covering a distance of 11.4 kilometres (7.1 mi). The fully elevated corridor has 12 stations and was built at a final project cost of ₹4,321 crore (equivalent to ₹80 billion or US$860 million in 2026). Work on the Versova-Andheri-Ghatkopar corridor, a part of Phase I, began on 8 February 2008. A crucial bridge on the project was completed at the end of 2012. The line was opened for service on 8 June 2014, by the then CM Prithviraj Chavan.

The line has interchanges with the Aqua Line 3 at Marol Naka, with the Yellow Line (Line 2) at Andheri (East) and D N Nagar.

=== Yellow Line (Lines 2A & 2B) ===
The Yellow Line is being executed in two phases - Line 2A and Line 2B. The 18.589 km (11.551 mi) long 2A corridor was executed by DMRC on behalf of MMRDA. This corridor has 17 stations (Dahisar (East) to D N Nagar), and cost ₹6,410 crore (equivalent to ₹70 billion or US$747.28 million in 2026). A section of the 2A corridor from Dahisar (East) to Dahanukarwadi was inaugurated on 2 April 2022. The rest of the corridor became fully operational from 19 January 2023.

The 2B line will be 23.643 km (14.691 mi) long, and is estimated to cost ₹109.7 billion (equivalent to ₹170 billion or US$1.79 billion in 2026), including a land acquisition cost of ₹1,274 crore (equivalent to ₹20 billion or US$208.34 million in 2026). This section will have 22 stations (D N Nagar to Mandale), work on which began in mid 2018. A section of the corridor was opened on 7 April 2026. The stretch was further extended to Chembur on 13 August 2026.

=== Aqua Line (Line 3) ===
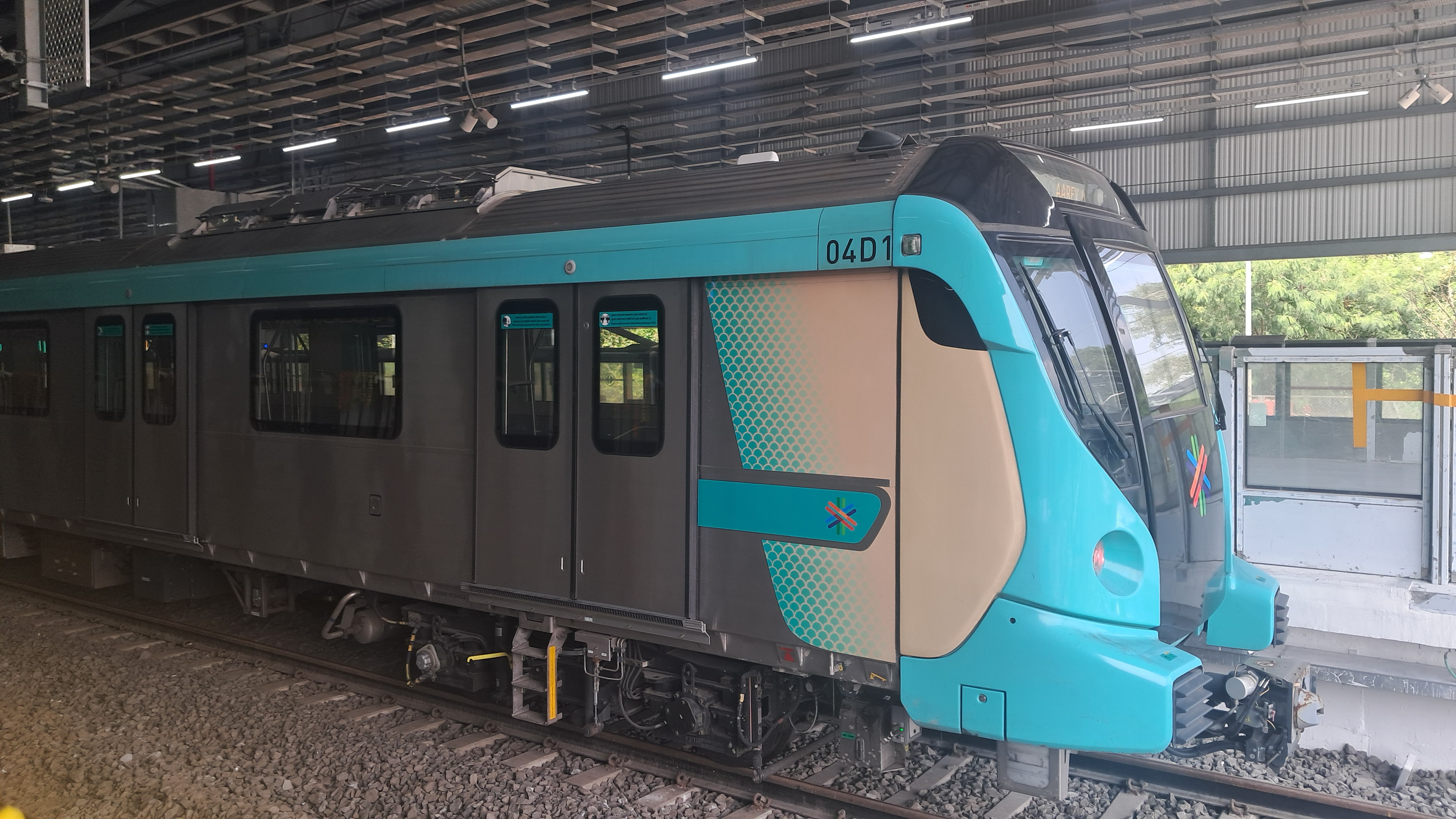
An Aqua line Driverless Alstom Metropolis departing Aarey JVLR metro station, bound for Cuffe Parade

A fully underground section of the metro, Line 3 is 33.50 km (20.82 mi) long. It has 27 stations and was built at a final cost of ₹37,276 crore (equivalent to ₹380 billion or US$4.1 billion in 2026). The line connects the Cuffe Parade business district in the south of Mumbai with SEEPZ and Aarey in the north. It also passes through the domestic and international terminals of Mumbai Airport, for which the airport operator (GVK) has promised an equity infusion of ₹777 crore (equivalent to ₹13 billion or US$136.70 million in 2026).

The original deadline for the project was 2016, but it was extended due to several delays including COVID-19. A section of the corridor from Aarey Colony to BKC was opened on 5 October 2024. This section cost ₹14,120 crore, and consisted of 10 stations in a 12.44 km (7.73 mi) stretch. The stretch from BKC to Acharya Atre Chowk, consisting of six stations, was opened on 10 May 2025. The remaining 10.99 km (6.83 mi) long final stretch from Acharya Atre Chowk to Cuffe Parade was opened on 8 October 2025.

The line has interchanges with the Blue Line 1 at Marol Naka, under-construction Pink Line 6 at Aarey JVLR, under-construction Red Line 7A and proposed Gold Line 8 at CSMI Airport T-2, under-construction Yellow Line 2B at BKC, Central Line & proposed Green Line 11 at Chhatrapati Shivaji Maharaj Terminus, Mumbai Monorail at Mahalaxmi (Sant Gadge Maharaj Chowk) and Western Line at Dadar, Mahalaxmi, Mumbai Central, Grant Road and Churchgate.

=== Green Line (Lines 4, 4A,10, 11) ===
The 60.409 km (37.536 mi) long Mira Bhayandar-Gaimukh-Kasarvadavali-Wadala connection will be fully elevated and have 38 stations. During the construction, this main line was divided into 3 smaller lines - Line 4 (Kasarvadavali to Bhakti Park (Wadala)), Line 4A (Kasarvadavali to Gaimukh), and the northwestern extension Line 10 (Gaimukh to Shivaji Chowk (Mira Road)). There is a newly proposed southern extension of Line 11 from MMRDA to MMRC, more central alignment announced to be a spur line from Anik Nagar Bus Depot to Gateway of India via Byculla.

MMRCL has also proposed an extension of this line to Dharavi, providing a connection with the Aqua line under the Dharavi Multi-Modal Transport Hub (MMTH) Project. The extension contains 2 stations, including another station in Sion.

Construction of Line 4 started in October 2018, while the construction of Line 4A started in September 2019. Meanwhile, the proposed Line 10 is currently under environmental review. Line 11 started construction at Zakaria Bunder Rd, but is on hold now, while other sections are still undergoing soil testing. 34 of the 38 elevated stations of the main line are under construction. In addition, the proposed new spur Line 11 has 15 stations, of which 13 are proposed to be underground, and the remaining 2 are elevated.

=== Orange Line (Lines 5 & 12) ===
The 45.70 km (28.40 mi)-long Thane-Bhiwandi-Kalyan-Taloja line will have 34 stations. During construction, the line was divided into 2 smaller lines - Line 5 (Kapurbawdi to Kalyan APMC) and Line 12 (Kalyan APMC to Taloja). Construction of Line 5 began in February 2020. However, the section from Bhiwandi to Kalyan APMC was put on hold by the State Government. Meanwhile, the construction of Line 12 started in March 2020. The line is majorly elevated except for a small underground section in Bhiwandi. The line has a total of 34 stations, of which 33 stations are elevated, while the station in Bhiwandi is set to be the only underground station in the line.

The line was approved by CM Devendra Fadnavis on 19 October 2016. The 12.811 km (7.960 mi) Thane – Bhiwandi section is under construction. Bhiwandi – Kalyan is on-hold (route modification in progress). The corridor is being constructed by Afcons in one package from Kalyan to Bhiwandi, including 7 stations.

=== Pink Line (Line 6) ===
The 14.47 km (8.99 mi) long Lokhandwala-Jogeshwari-Vikhroli-Kanjurmarg Metro-VI corridor will have 13 stations and cost ₹6,672 crore. It will be an elevated corridor. It will connect Lokhandwala Complex in Andheri in the western suburbs to Vikhroli and Kanjurmarg in the eastern suburbs. The stations include Lokhandwala Complex, Adarsh Nagar, Momin Nagar, JVLR, Shyam Nagar, Mahakali Caves, SEEPZ Village, Saki Vihar Road, Ram Baug, Powai Lake, IIT Powai, Kanjurmarg (West), and Vikhroli-Eastern Express Highway.

Metro 6 will provide interchange with Metro 2 at Infinity Mall in Andheri, with Metro 3 at SEEPZ, with Metro 4 and the Mumbai Suburban Railway at Jogeshwari and Kanjurmarg, and with Metro 7 at JVLR.

The line was approved by CM Devendra Fadnavis on 19 October 2016. The MMRDA issued a tender to conduct a detailed aerial mapping survey of the alignment in April 2017. Authorities will also be able to determine the location of trees along the alignment accuracy of up to 10 cm utilizing a differential GPS (DGPS), while a digital aerial triangulation system will help determine the types of trees, their heights and diameters.

=== Red Line (Lines 7, 7A, 9) ===
The Red Line, in its entirety is 31.045 km (19.290 mi) long and has 22 stations. The line is being executed in three phases - Line 7 (Dahisar (East) to Gundavali), Line 7A (Gundavali to Chhatrapati Shivaji Maharaj International Airport - T2), and Line 9 (Subhash Chandra Bose Stadium to Dahisar (East)). Construction of Line 7 began in August 2016; meanwhile, Line 7A and Line 9 began construction in March 2020. The line is mostly elevated, with the Airport section being the only section underground. There are a total of 22 stations on the line, of which 21 are elevated, and 1 is underground.

A section of the Line 7 from Dahisar (East) to Aarey was opened on 2 April 2022 by the then CM Uddhav Thackeray. The rest of the corridor was inaugurated on 19 January 2023 by Prime Minister Narendra Modi. Line 7 has a length of 16.5 km, consists of 13 stations and was built at a final cost of ₹6,208 crore (equivalent to ₹68 billion or US$723.73 million in 2026).

A section of the Line 9 from Dahisar (East) to Kashigaon (along with the section of the Yellow Line from Mandale to Diamond Garden) was inaugurated on 7 April 2026, by the CM Devendra Fadnavis.

=== Gold Line (Line 8) ===
This is an approved metro line between the Chhatrapati Shivaji Maharaj International Airport and the Navi Mumbai International Airport. It will connect Mumbai airport to Navi Mumbai airport and its length would be approx 32 km. The corridor was initially to be executed by MMRDA; however, as per a government resolution (GR), the City & Industrial Development Corporation (CIDCO) has been appointed as the nodal agency to execute it under a PPP Model.

It's expected to cost ₹15,000 crore. The line has an anticipated daily ridership of 3 lakh.

=== Purple Line (Line 13) ===
It is a proposed metro project to connect Mira Road with Virar. The project length is 23 km (14 mi) and the estimated cost of the project is ₹6,900 crore.

=== Magenta Line (Line 14) ===
It is an approved metro project to connect Kanjurmarg to Ambarnath-Badlapur. It will have an intersection at Kanjurmarg with Line 6, the Pink Line. This project is now at the DPR stage. The project length is 45 km (28 mi) and the estimated cost of the project is ₹13,500 crore.

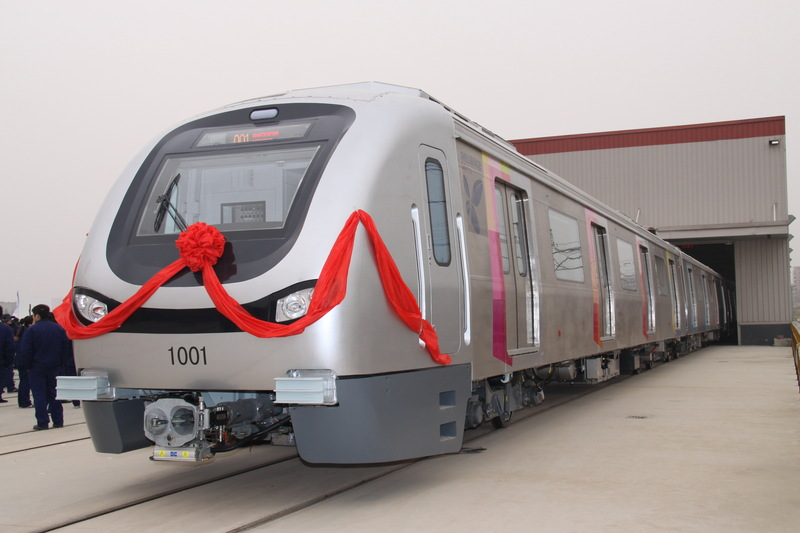
Railcars of the Mumbai Metro in 2010

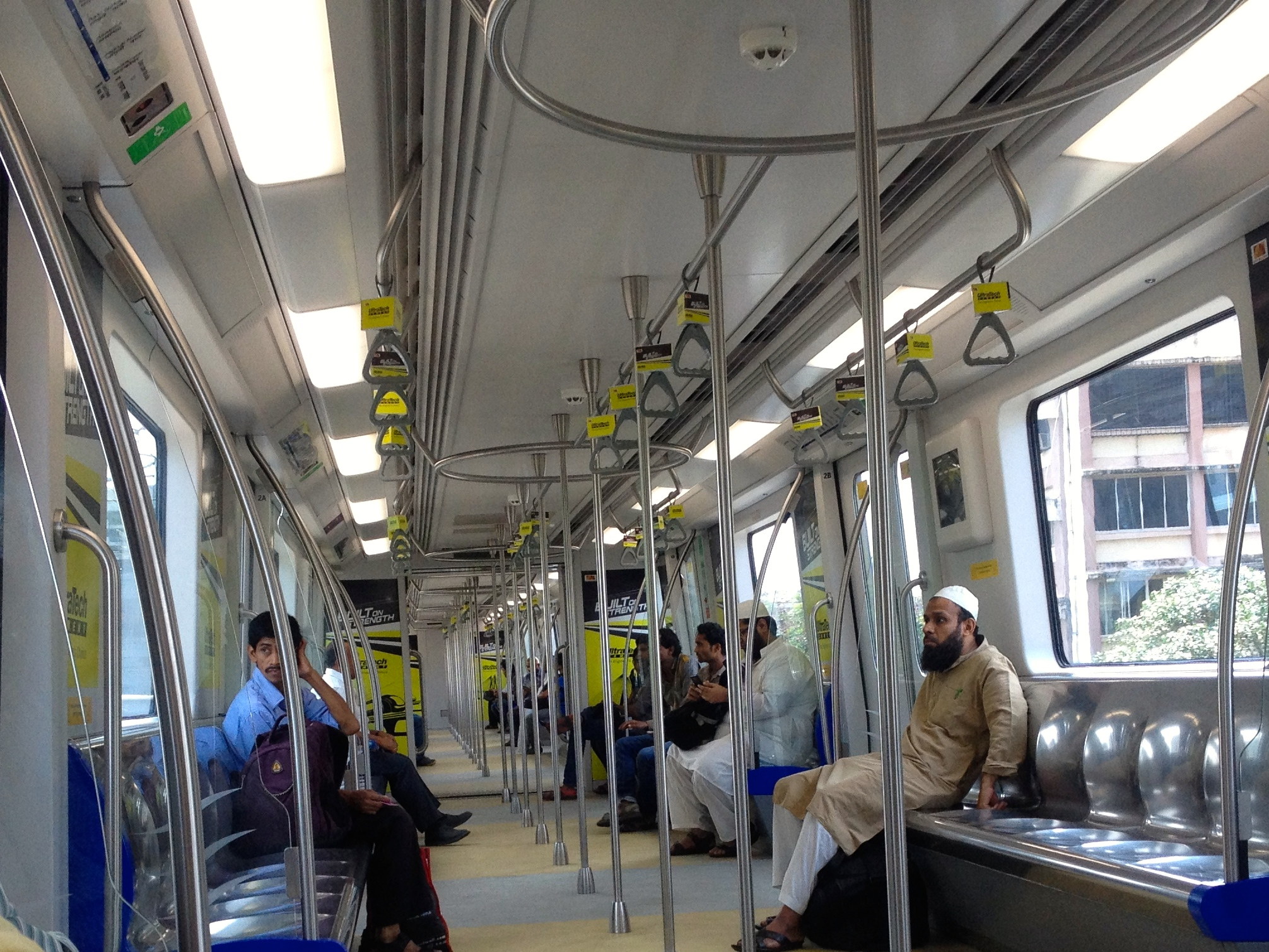
Interior of a metro train

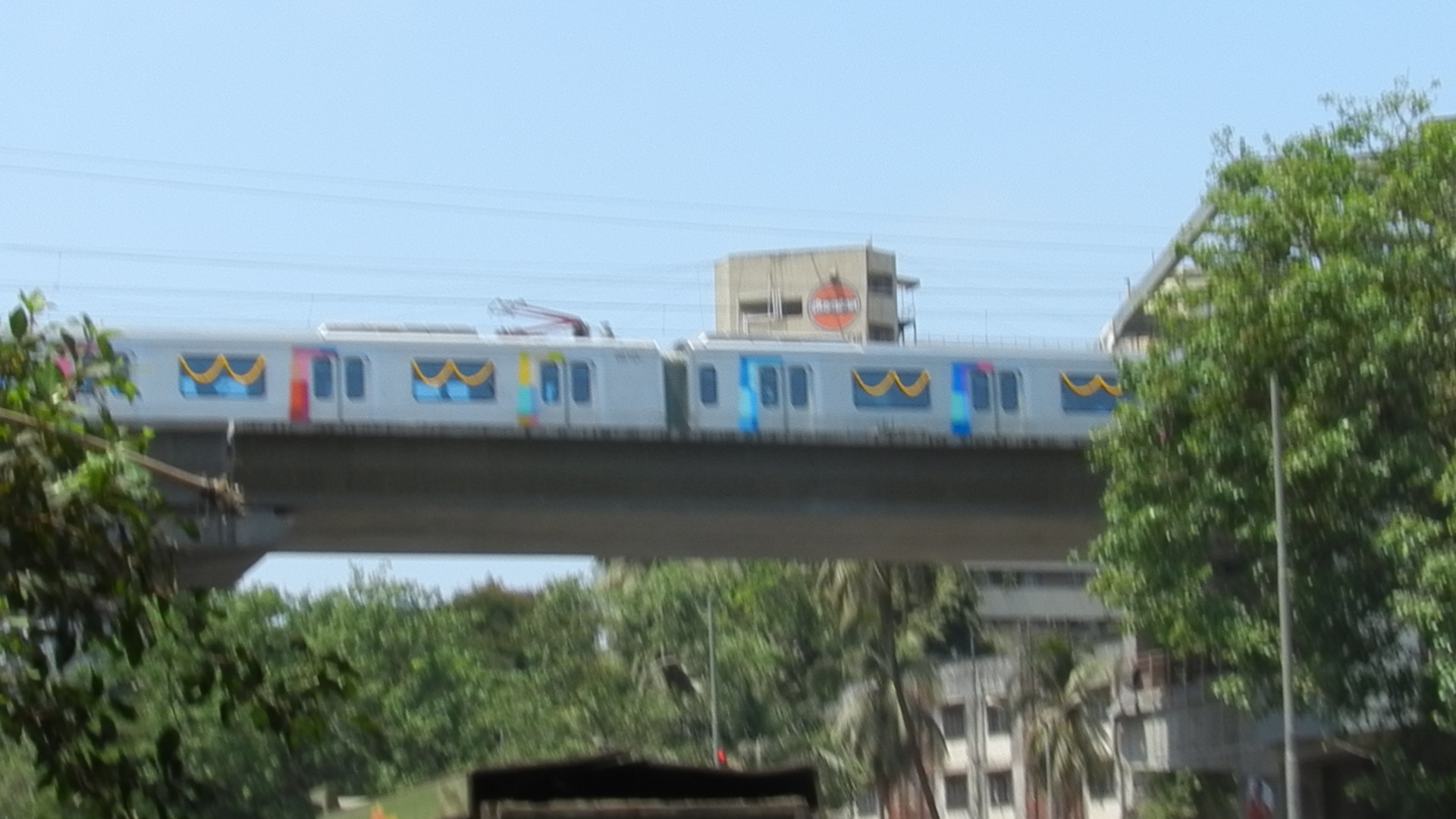
A metro train on an elevated viaduct

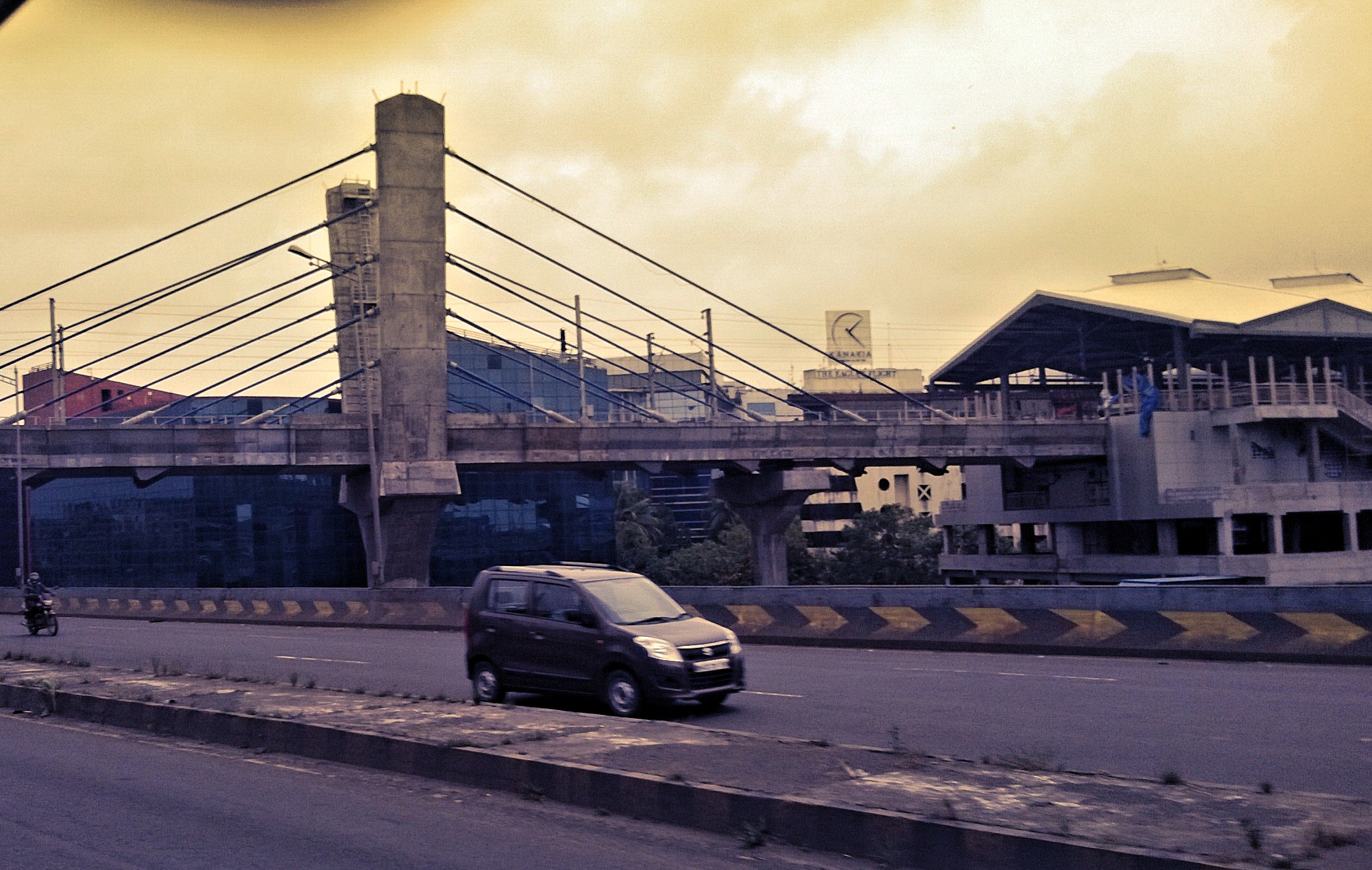
Metro bridge, part of the Mumbai Metro

== Network ==
Mumbai Metro
No.	Line Name	Number	Terminals		Stations	Length	First Operation	Last Extension
1	Blue	1	Versova	Ghatkopar	12	11.40 km (7.08 mi)	8 June 2014	
2	Yellow	2A	Dahisar (East)	Andheri (West)	17	18.6 km (11.6 mi)	2 April 2022	19 January 2023
2	Yellow	2B	Chembur	Mandale	6	6.83 km (4.24 mi)	8 April 2026	13 August 2026
3	Aqua	3	Aarey JVLR	Cuffe Parade	27	33.45 km (20.78 mi)	7 October 2024	9 October 2025
4	Red	7	Dahisar (East)	Gundavali	14	16.5 km (10.3 mi)	2 April 2022	19 January 2023
4	Red	9	Kashigaon	Dahisar (East)	3	4.7 km (2.9 mi)	8 April 2026	
Total					77	91.48 km (56.84 mi)		

== Rolling stock ==
Reliance Infrastructure consulted a number of major international rolling stock builders to provide the train fleet for the Mumbai Metro. Bidders for the contract included established metro-vehicle manufacturers such as Kawasaki, Alstom, Siemens and Bombardier, but CRRC Nanjing Puzhen of China was ultimately chosen to supply rolling stock for ₹600 crore. In May 2008, CSR Nanjing completed the first 16 trains, each comprising four cars. The first ten trains were reported to be ready for operation in January 2013.

The coaches are fire retardant, air-conditioned and designed to reduce noise and vibration, and will feature both high seating capacity and ample space for standing passengers. They will be outfitted with a number of features for safety and convenience, including LCD screens, 3D route maps, first-aid kits, wheelchair facilities, fire-fighting equipment and intercom systems permitting communication with the train driver. Each coach will furthermore feature a black box to assist in accident investigations. The trains will be capable of carrying over 1,100 passengers in a four-car unit, with each carriage being approximately 3.2 metres (10 ft 6 in) wide.

In 2018, the Mumbai Metro Rail Corporation chose Alstom to supply 31 eight car trains for Aqua line (line 3). These trains are capable of driverless operations and were built at Alstom's factory in Sri City, Andhra Pradesh.

In 2018, Mumbai Metropolitan Region Development Authority which will operate all metro lines except Line 3, awarded a tender to Bharat Earth Movers Ltd. (BEML) to supply 63 trainsets (378 coaches) for Yellow Line (Line 2) and Red Line (Line 7) at a cost of ₹3,015 crores ($427.33 million). Capable of driverless operations, the trains are manufactured at BEML's factory in Bengaluru, and the first train set for the Yellow Line arrived in Mumbai on 27 January 2021, and will continue to receive the rest of the sets until 2022. On 17 January 2021, Bombardier won the tender to supply 234 driverless coaches for the Green Line (Line 4) of six-car configuration for Mumbai metro. However, the contract was cancelled in March 2022 due to delays and uncertainties of the project. In August 2025, the MMRDA awarded a contract to L&T to supply 39 trainsets of 6 cars each for the Green Line (Line 4), to be manufactured by Alstom as part of an integrated systems package. In the absence of a depot and delay in procuring rolling stock, the MMRDA also decided to temporarily transport eight idle trains from the Mandale depot on the Yellow Line to the Green Line to commence trials on a section of the line.

In 2025, the MMRDA awarded two contracts to Titagarh Rail Systems for 108 coaches and 132 coaches to be delivered for the Orange Line and Pink Line respectively.

== Power supply ==
Mumbai Metro runs on alternating current (AC), which is typically more labour-intensive and cost-intensive. MMRDA joint project director Dilip Kawathkar stated that AC power was chosen "after a proper study by a team of experts" which found that the AC model was "a better option". Bidders for Line 3 were reportedly in favour of the DC model. Experts believe that the decision to use AC will escalate the project cost of underground lines by 15%, since more digging is required for the rail to work on AC.

== Signalling and communications ==
The Mumbai Metro will feature an advanced signalling system, including an automatic train protection system (ATPS) and automated signalling to control train movements on the 11-kilometre (6.8 mi) Line 1. A four-minute service interval is anticipated on the route.

Siemens will supply the signalling systems required for the project, while Thales Group will supply the Metro's communication systems. The network's signalling and train control systems will be based on LZB 700M technology.

== Ridership and Impact ==
In October 2025, after the Aqua line became fully operational, the average daily ridership on all Mumbai Metro lines was approximately 900,000 per day, with the Blue line at about 460,000, followed by Yellow plus Red at 260,000 and Aqua at 160,000 daily average ridership. On 21 October 2019, 1,960 days (approx. 5 years) after Mumbai Metro Line 1's inception, the system crossed 600 million passengers, with an average daily ridership of around 450,000 passengers. In 2026, reports noted that ridership on some newly opened Mumbai Metro corridors, especially the Aqua Line, remained below expectations, with last-mile connectivity gaps and fare differentials cited as factors affecting commuter uptake. Line 1 reached an annual ridership of 157 million during fiscal year 2025-26. Lines 2A and 7 together crossed 200 million cumulative passenger journeys by August 2025, while Line 3 crossed 40 million cumulative passengers by April 2026.

Opening of subsequent lines has relieved pressure on the Mumbai Suburban Railway, which had become over congested and unsafe due to open doors, unlike the Metro which has closed door air-conditioned coaches.

The Mumbai Metro has been credited for sustainability due to reduced carbon emissions by employing energy saving methods like regenerative braking systems and cutting down traffic congestion, besides eco-friendly construction methods. The Mumbai Metro has allowed bicycles with special racks for commuters at no extra charge on Red and Yellow lines. However, on Aqua line, they are currently not allowed for crowd rush during peak hours, although officials plan to allow it on completion of the line. On the Blue line, foldable bicycles are allowed.

== See also ==
- Urban rail transit in India
- List of rapid transit systems
- Public transport in Mumbai
  - Mumbai Suburban Railway
  - BEST
  - Navi Mumbai Metro
  - Thane Metro
- Mumbai Monorail
- Mumbai Water Metro
- M-Indicator
- Delhi Metro
- Delhi Meerut RRTS
