= Dahisar East metro station =

Mumbai Metro interchange station serving Lines 2A, 7 and 9

Dahisar (East)
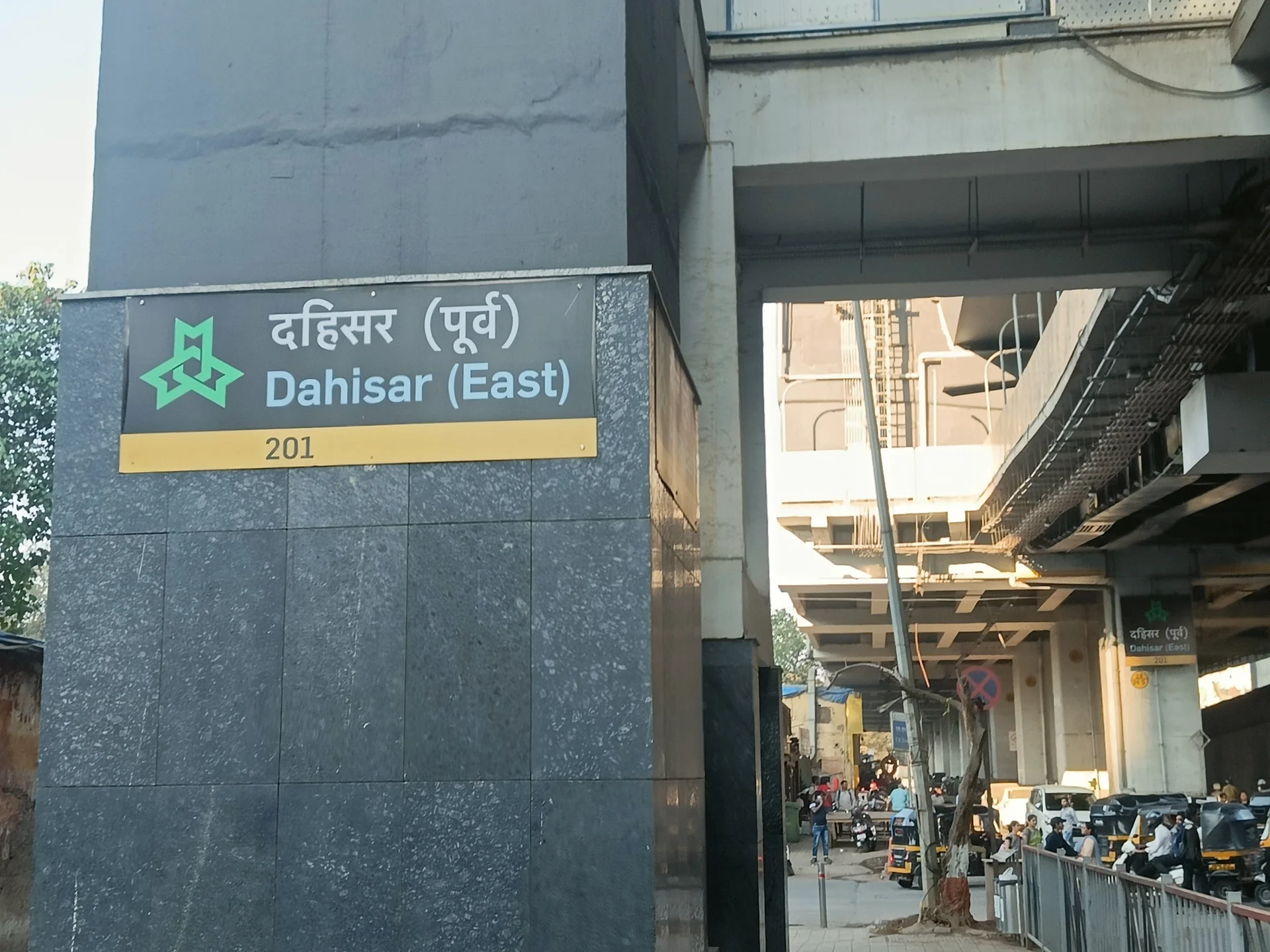

General information
- Location: Ghartan Pada, Dahisar (East), Mumbai, Maharashtra 400068; India
- Coordinates: 19°15′04″N 72°52′01″E
- Owner: Mumbai Metropolitan Region Development Authority
- Operator: Maha Mumbai Metro Operation Corporation Ltd.
- Line: Line 2A Line 7 Line 9
- Platforms: 4 side platforms
- Tracks: 5
- Connections: BEST bus services

Construction
- Structure type: Elevated
- Parking: No
- Accessible: Yes

Other information
- Station code: 201; 901

History
- Opened: 2 April 2022; 4 years ago (Line 2A, 7); 7 April 2026; 6 months ago (Line 9)
Services
| Preceding station | Mumbai Metro | Following station |
|---|---|---|
| Anand Nagar 202 towards Andheri (West) | Line 2A | Terminus |
| Terminus | Line 7 | Ovaripada 701 towards Gundavali |
| Pandurang Wadi 902 towards Subhash Chandra Bose Stadium | Line 9 | Terminus |
Track layout
Location

Dahisar (East) is an elevated metro station on the Mumbai Metro in Mumbai, India, located on the Western Express Highway in northern Mumbai. It serves as the northern terminus of both the Yellow Line 2A and the Red Line 7, and as the southern terminus of Line 9, which extends the Red Line northward into Mira-Bhayandar. The station is owned by the Mumbai Metropolitan Region Development Authority (MMRDA) and was opened to the public on 2 April 2022, alongside the first phases of Lines 2A and 7. On 7 April 2026, Line 9 Phase 1 (Dahisar (East) to Kashigaon) was inaugurated, making Dahisar (East) a three-line interchange. Passengers can transfer between all three lines at concourse level without exiting the paid area or passing through additional security checks.

== History ==
J Kumar Infraprojects was awarded the contract to construct the station in June 2016. The MMRDA announced that electrification of the line had been completed on 26 May 2020. The station was opened to the public on 2 April 2022, along with the first phases of Line 2A and Line 7.

Both lines were extended to their full lengths on 19 January 2023, with Line 2A reaching Andheri West and Line 7 reaching Gundavali in Andheri East. The inauguration was performed by Prime Minister Narendra Modi.

On 7 April 2026, the Red Line was extended northward from Dahisar East to Kashigaon in Mira-Bhayandar, with the inauguration of Phase 1 of Line 9 by Chief Minister Devendra Fadnavis along with Deputy Chief Ministers Eknath Shinde and Sunetra Pawar. Commercial services began the following day. This made Dahisar East an interchange station, as passengers could now transfer between the Red Line and Yellow Line at concourse level without exiting the paid area.

== Station layout ==
| L2 | Side platform, doors will open on the right |
| L2 | Platform 1 | towards Gundavali (Ovaripada) → |
| L2 | Platform 2 | ← towards Subhash Chandra Bose Stadium (Pandurang Wadi) |
| L2 | Side platform, doors will open on the right |
| L2 | Platform 3 | ← Pocket track |
| L1 | Concourse | Fare control, station agent, Metro Card vending machines, crossover to Line 2A |
| L2 | Side platform, doors will open on the right |
| L2 | Platform 1 | Alighting only → |
| L2 | Platform 2 | ← towards Andheri (West) (Anand Nagar) |
| L2 | Side platform, doors will open on the right |
| L1 | Concourse | Fare control, station agent, Metro Card vending machines, crossover to Line 9 |
| G | Street level | Exit/Entrance |

=== Power and signaling system ===
Like all other stations and railways of the Mumbai metro, Dahisar East station also uses a 25,000 volt AC power system by "overhead catenary" to operate the trains.
