= M-Indicator =

Mobile app

m-Indicator
- Original author: Sachin Teke
- Developer: Mobond
- Release: May 2010; 16 years ago

Stable release(s)
- Android: 17.0.189 / 6 February 2021; 5 years ago
- iOS: 17.5 / 7 February 2021; 5 years ago
- Windows Phone: 11.0 / 31 July 2017; 9 years ago
- BlackBerry: 11.0.78 / 26 April 2016; 10 years ago
- Java ME: 9.4 / 21 November 2014; 11 years ago
- Operating system: iOS 9.1 or later, Android 4.1 or later, Windows Phone, BlackBerry OS, Java ME, macOS 11.0 or later
- Platform: x86, x64, ARM, ARM64
- Type: Travel
- Website: www.m-indicator.mobond.com

M-Indicator (stylised as m-Indicator) is a timetable app that primarily provides information about public transportation in the cities of Mumbai and Pune. It contains details about 232 trains, making 3,000 daily trips through 108 stations on the Mumbai's suburban train network. It has 84,000 timetable entries. It was created in 2010 by Sachin Teke.

m-Indicator has been downloaded by over 1 crore users on Android. It hosts a chat on which Mumbai's 75 lakh commuters share real-time information about rescheduling or cancellation of train services.

== History ==
A news story published on Moneylife in January 2012 describes m-Indicator as "a little known company's mobile app". The application could then be installed on Android and Java phones. It informs that the application developers preferred anonymity, describing themselves as "mobond.com is an organisation of enthusiastic software developers having the aim of providing free software products." Mobond is expanded as "bonding the mob". The creator informs that in the name m-Indicator, "m" stands for mobile and Mumbai, and "Indicator" for what it means.

=== Creator ===
m-Indicator was developed by Sachin Teke, an IT engineer and alumnus of VJTI of the 2006 batch. Living in Nerul in Navi Mumbai, his work had him commuting to SEEPZ daily, using a train between Nerul and Kurla, then a bus, followed by an auto-rickshaw. He faced uncertainty regarding train schedules, more so in the evening on his way back home. According to Teke, the need for a reliable schedule information system was fundamental, considering the number of commuters who travel by train in Mumbai. Teke quit his job to develop m-Indicator and work on it full-time through his company Mobond.

== Features ==
The application provides the following features:

1. Schedules for suburban trains, buses, metro rail, mono rail and ferries.
2. Information about picnic spots in the vicinity of Mumbai, hotels, hospitals, and movie and drama theatres.
3. Posts related to jobs and rentals.
4. Separate chat rooms for central, western and harbour line commuters.
5. Real time information on upcoming suburban trains, jurisdiction areas of various police stations, availability of free Wi-Fi at a particular station, and in case of an incident, the location and police station under whose jurisdiction it lies, the names, addresses and phone numbers to be reached in emergencies, directions and information on how cyber crimes are to be reported.
6. Playing of audio-visual messages from railway police.
7. Platform number at which a particular train will halt and position of the door from which to exit.
8. Information on cancelled trains.
9. Information on whether a train is slow or fast.
10. Facilitation of sharing auto-rickshaw or taxi rides.
11. A security system for women commuters.
