= Jagannath Shankar Sheth metro station =

Metro station in Mumbai, India

Jagannath Shankar Sheth Metro
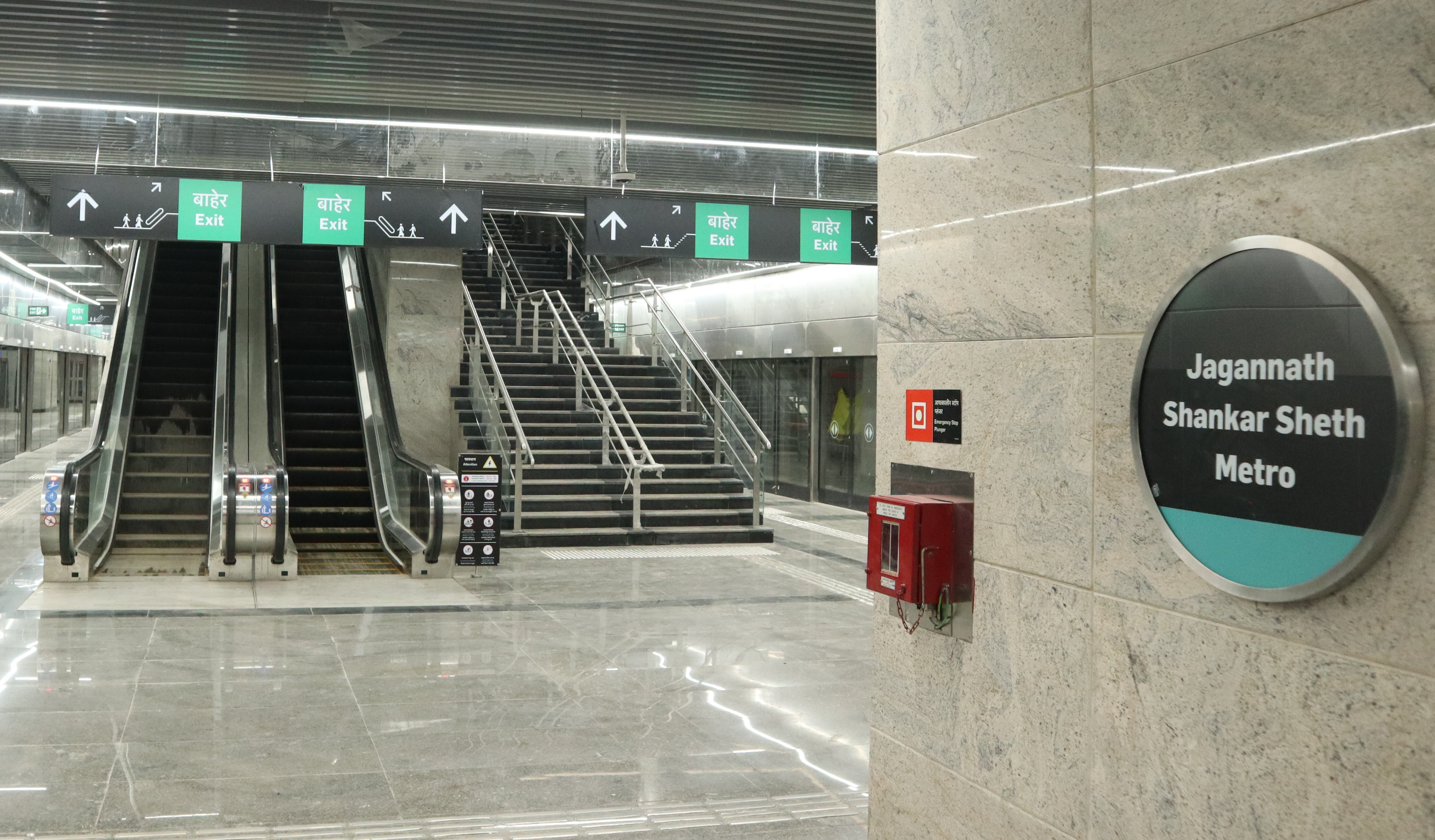
- Platform level of the station

General information
- Location: Mumbai Central East, Mumbai Central, Mumbai, Maharashtra 400008
- Coordinates: 18°58′15″N 72°49′19″E
- Owner: Mumbai Metro Rail Corporation Ltd.
- Line: Line 3
- Platforms: 1 island platform
- Connections: Western at Mumbai Central

Construction
- Structure type: Underground
- Accessible: Yes

Other information
- Status: Staffed, Operational
- Station code: MCLM

History
- Opened: 8 October 2025; 11 months ago
- Former names: Mumbai Central Metro

Services
Preceding station	Mumbai Metro	Following station
Grant Road towards Cuffe Parade	Line 3	Mahalaxmi towards Aarey JVLR
Track layout
Location

Jagannath Shankar Sheth Metro station (known as Mumbai Central Metro station during the planning) is an underground metro station on the North–South corridor of the Aqua Line of the Mumbai Metro in Mumbai, India. It connects to the Mumbai Central station. The station was inaugurated on 8 October 2025, along with the remaining section of the Aqua Line from Acharya Atre Chowk to Cuffe Parade.

== Station Layout ==
G	Ground level	Exit/Entrance
C	Concourse	Customer Service, Shops, Vending machine, ATMs
P Platforms	Platform 2	Towards Aarey JVLR (Mahalaxmi) →
P Platforms	Island platform
P Platforms	Platform 1	← Towards Cuffe Parade (Grant Road)

== Entry/Exit ==
- A1 - Lamington Road, Nathani Heights
- A2 - Mumbai Central, Bellasis Road
- A4 - Mumbai Central
- A5 - MSRTC Interstate Bus Depot, Jehangir Boman Behram Road
- B2/B3 - Nair Hospital
- B4 - Maratha Mandir, Babasaheb Gawde Institute of Technology

== See also ==
- Mumbai
- Transport in Mumbai
- List of Mumbai Metro stations
- List of rapid transit systems in India
- List of metro systems
