= Mahalaxmi metro station =

Metro station in Mumbai, India

Mahalaxmi Metro
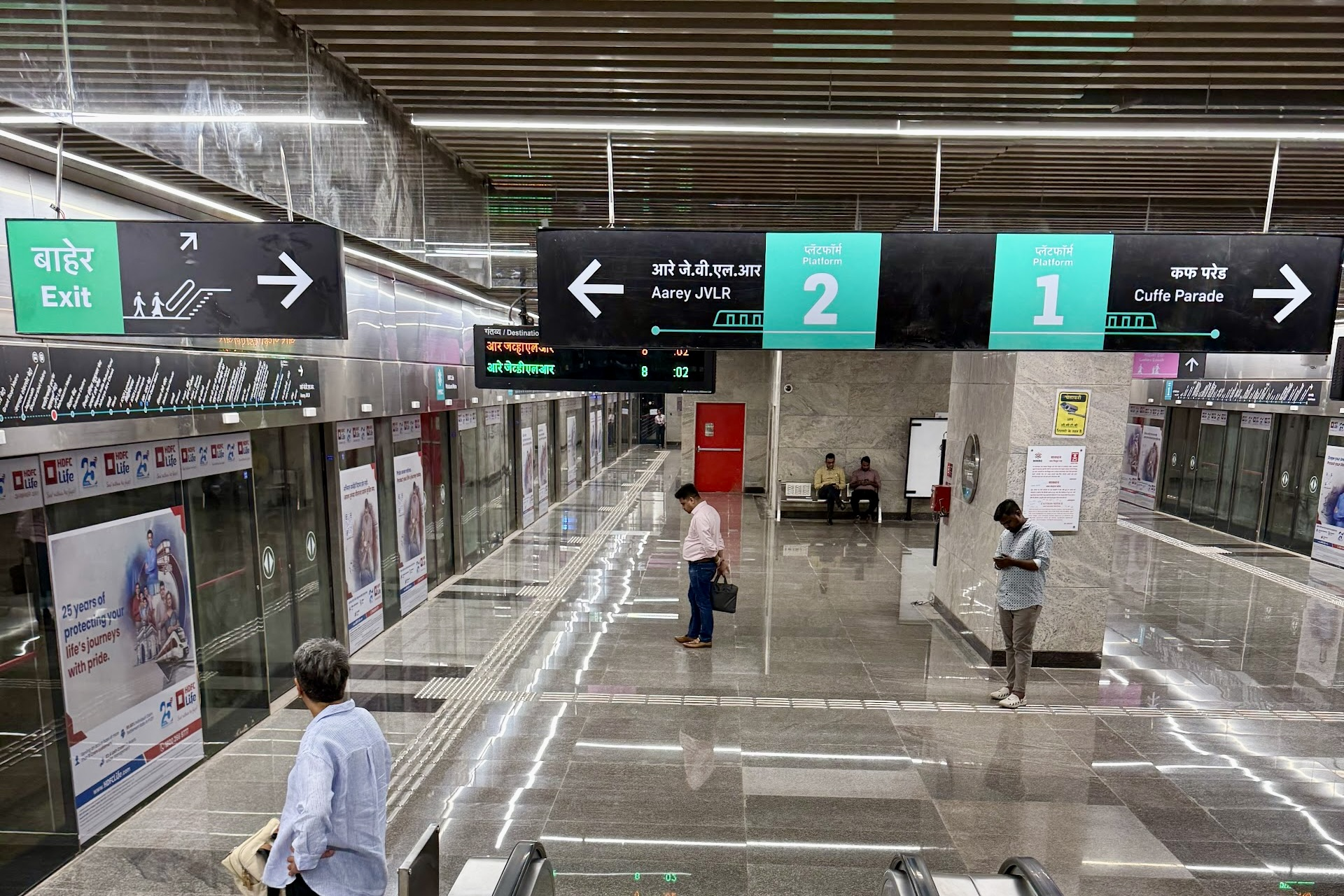
- Platform level of the station

General information
- Location: Almas Apartments, Arthur Rd, RTO Colony, Mumbai Central, Mumbai, Maharashtra 400011
- Coordinates: 18°58′46″N 72°49′31″E
- Owner: Mumbai Metro Rail Corporation Ltd.
- Line: Line 3
- Platforms: 1 island platform
- Connections: Western at Mahalaxmi; Sant Gadge Maharaj Chowk

Construction
- Structure type: Underground
- Accessible: Yes

Other information
- Status: Staffed, Operational
- Station code: MLXM

History
- Opened: 8 October 2025; 11 months ago

Services
Preceding station	Mumbai Metro	Following station
Jagannath Shankar Sheth towards Cuffe Parade	Line 3	Science Centre towards Aarey JVLR
Track layout
Location

Mahalaxmi metro station (also known as HDFC Life - Mahalaxmi Metro for sponsorship reasons) is an underground metro station located in the Mahalaxmi neighborhood, on the North–South corridor of the Aqua Line of the Mumbai Metro in Mumbai, India. It provides connectivity to the Western Line and the Mumbai Monorail. The station was opened to public on 9 October 2025, along with the remaining section of the Aqua Line from Acharya Atre Chowk to Cuffe Parade.

== Station layout ==
G	Ground level	Exit/Entrance
C	Concourse	Customer Service, Shops, Vending machine, ATMs
P Platforms	Platform 2	Towards Aarey JVLR (Science Centre) →
P Platforms	Island platform, doors will open on the right
P Platforms	Platform 1	← Towards Cuffe Parade (Jagannath Shankar Sheth)

=== Entrances and exits ===
- A1 – RTO Colony, Belvedere Court
- A2 – Agripada Police Station, Kalpatura Heights
- A4 – Vivarea Tower C&D, One Mahalaxmi
- B2 – Dhobi Ghat, Mahalaxmi railway station
- B3 – Vivarea Tower A, Bellagio Residency
- B5 – RTO Colony, Agripada Police Station

== See also ==
- Mumbai
- Transport in Mumbai
- List of Mumbai Metro stations
- List of rapid transit systems in India
- List of metro systems
