= Science Centre metro station =

Metro station in Mumbai, India

Science Centre
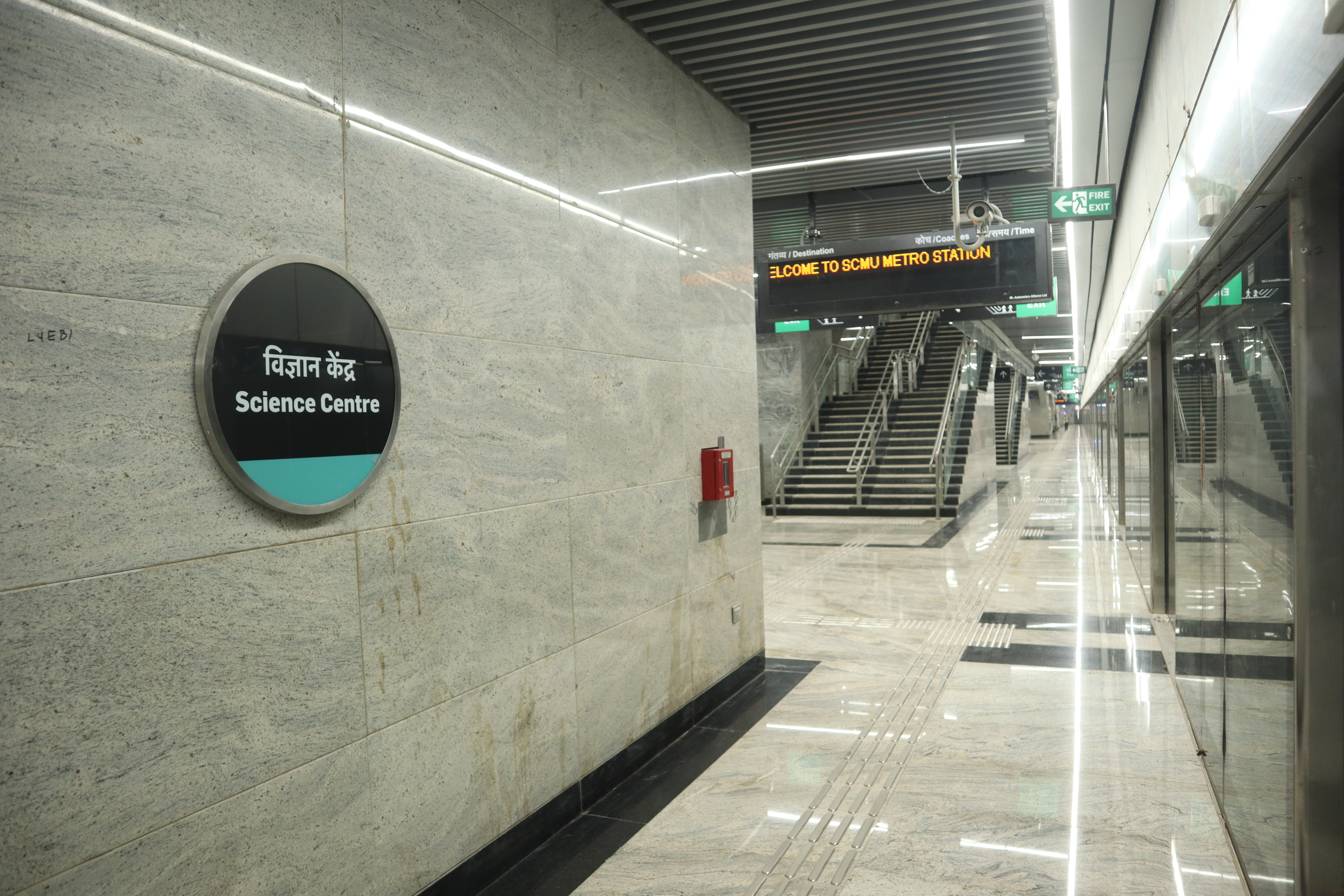
- Platform level of the station

General information
- Location: Gandhi Nagar, Upper Worli, Worli, Mumbai, Maharashtra 400018
- Coordinates: 18°59′26″N 72°49′20″E
- Owner: Mumbai Metro Rail Corporation Ltd.
- Line: Line 3
- Platforms: 1 island platform

Construction
- Structure type: Underground
- Accessible: Yes

Other information
- Status: Staffed, Operational
- Station code: SCMU

History
- Opened: 9 October 2025; 11 months ago
- Former names: Science Museum

Services
Preceding station	Mumbai Metro	Following station
Mahalaxmi towards Cuffe Parade	Line 3	Acharya Atre Chowk towards Aarey JVLR
Track layout
Location

Science Centre is an underground metro station located in the Worli neighbourhood, on the North–South corridor of the Aqua Line of the Mumbai Metro in Mumbai, India. It provides connectivity to the Nehru Science Centre. The station was opened to public on 9 October 2025, along with the remaining section of the Aqua Line from Acharya Atre Chowk to Cuffe Parade.

== Station layout ==
G	Ground level	Exit/Entrance
C	Concourse	Customer Service, Shops, Vending machine, ATMs
P Platforms	Platform 2	Towards Aarey JVLR (Acharya Atre Chowk) →
P Platforms	Island platform, door opens on the right
P Platforms	Platform 1	← Towards Cuffe Parade (Mahalaxmi)

=== Entrances exits ===
- A1 – Mahalaxmi Racecourse, Amateur Riders' Club
- A3 – Haji Usman Seth Rakhangi Chowk, Namaste Tower
- A3 – Haji Usman Seth Rakhangi Chowk, Mahalaxmi Sports Stadium
- A6 – Anand Niketan General Hospital, Famous Studio
- B2 – Nehru Science Centre, Nehru Planetarium
- B3 – Four Seasons Hotel, St. Peter's Cemetery

== See also ==
- Mumbai
- Transport in Mumbai
- List of Mumbai Metro stations
- List of rapid transit systems in India
- List of metro systems
