= Worli metro station =

Metro station on Mumbai Metro's Aqua Line

Worli
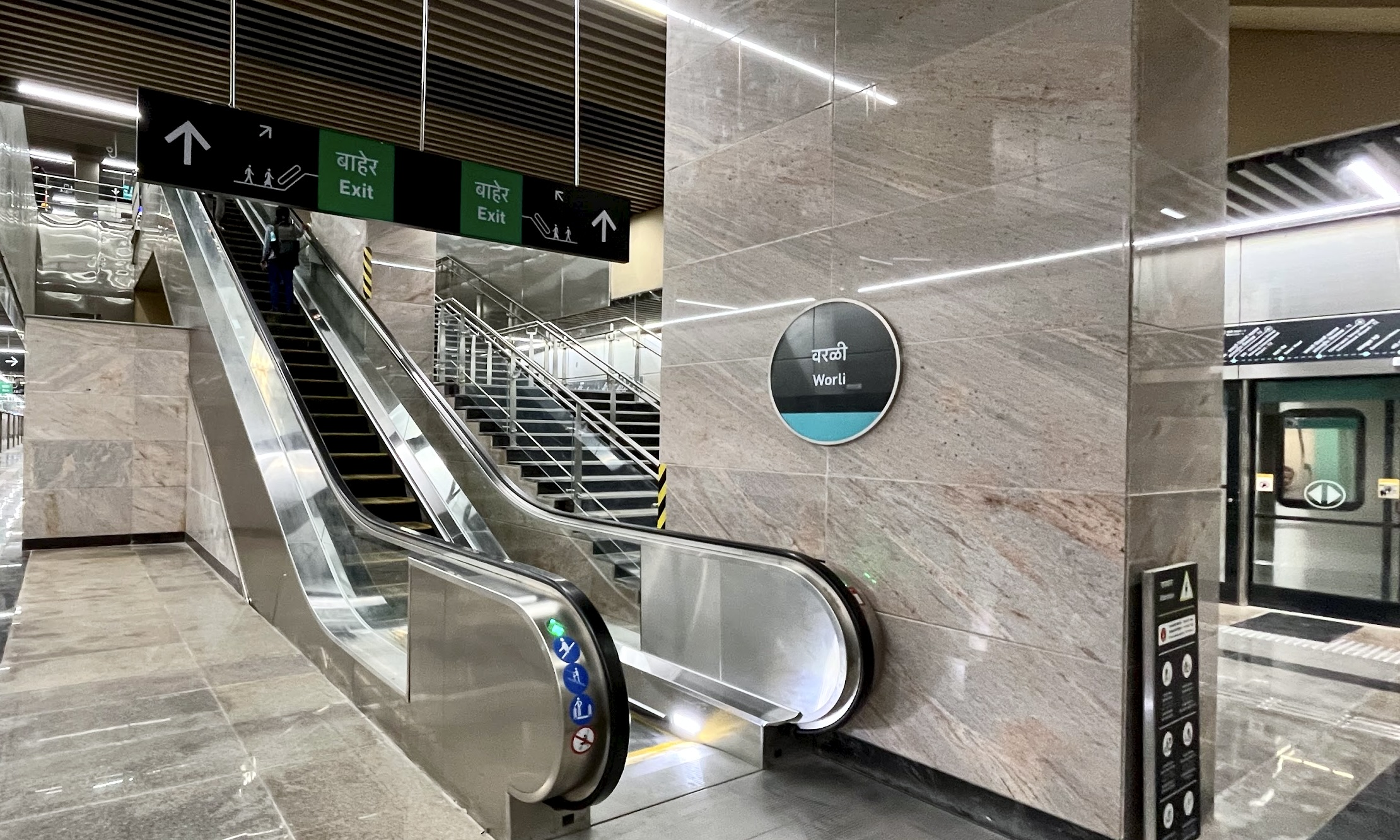
- Platform level of Worli metro station

General information
- Location: Worli Shivaji Nagar, Worli, Mumbai, Maharashtra 400025
- Coordinates: 19°00′31″N 72°49′10″E
- Owner: Mumbai Metro Rail Corporation Ltd.
- Operator: Delhi Metro Rail Corporation
- Line: Line 3
- Platforms: 1 Island platform

Construction
- Structure type: Underground
- Parking: (TBC)

Other information
- Status: Staffed, Operational
- Station code: WOR

History
- Opened: 9 May 2025; 17 months ago

Services
Preceding station	Mumbai Metro	Following station
Acharya Atre Chowk towards Cuffe Parade	Line 3	Siddhivinayak towards Aarey JVLR
Track layout
Location

Worli is an underground metro station serving Worli area on the North-South corridor of the Aqua Line 3 of Mumbai Metro in Mumbai, India. It was opened to public on 10 May 2025.

== Station Layout ==
G	Ground level	Exit/Entrance
L1	Concourse	Customer Service, Shops, Vending machine, ATMs
L2; Platforms	Platform 2	Towards Aarey JVLR (Siddhivinayak) →
L2; Platforms	Island platform
L2; Platforms	Platform 1	← Towards Cuffe Parade (Acharya Atre Chowk)

== Entry/Exit ==
- A1 - Worli Police Station, Maharashtra State Police Housing & Welfare Corporation Ltd.
- A2 - Kamala Mills Compound, Lodha World One
- B1 - Glaxo Smith Kline
- B2 - Dr. Ravindra Kulkarni Chowk Sasmira
- B3 - Worli Fire Station, Maharashtra Riffle Association
- B4 - Aditya Birla Centre, BMC Pay & Park

== See also ==
- Mumbai
- Transport in Mumbai
- List of Mumbai Metro stations
- List of rapid transit systems in India
- List of metro systems
