= Sahar Road metro station =

Mumbai Metro's Aqua Line metro station

Sahar Road
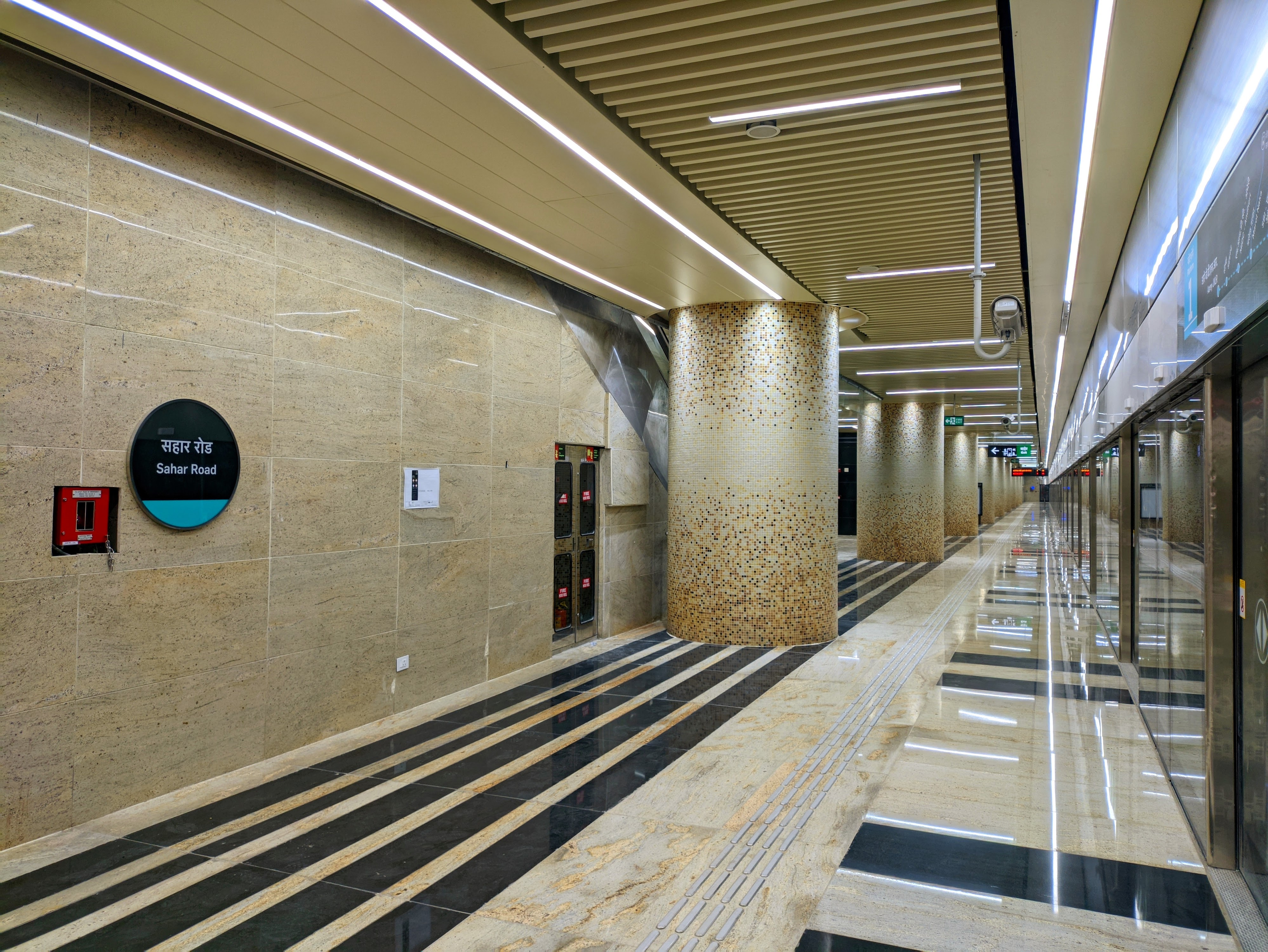
- Platform 1 of Sahar Road station in October 2024

General information
- Location: AAI Colony, J B Nagar, Andheri East, Mumbai, Maharashtra 400099
- Coordinates: 19°06′08″N 72°51′55″E
- Owner: Mumbai Metro Rail Corporation Ltd.
- Operator: Delhi Metro Rail Corporation
- Line: Line 3
- Platforms: 1 island platform

Construction
- Structure type: Underground
- Accessible: Yes

Other information
- Status: Staffed, Operational
- Station code: SHRR
- Website: mmrcl.com/station/SHRR

History
- Opened: 5 October 2024; 2 years ago

Services
Preceding station	Mumbai Metro	Following station
CSMI Airport - T1 towards Cuffe Parade	Line 3	CSMI Airport - T2 towards Aarey JVLR
Track layout
Location

Sahar Road is an underground metro station on the North-South corridor of the Aqua Line 3 of Mumbai Metro in Mumbai, India. This metro station was inaugurated on 5 October 2024 by Prime Minister Narendra Modi, followed by the commencement of the metro service from 7 October 2024.

== Station Layout ==
G	Ground level	Exit/Entrance
S	Subway level	Subway below Sahar Road
L1	Concourse	Customer Service, Shops, Vending machine, ATMs
L2; Platforms	Platform 2	Towards Aarey JVLR (CSMI Airport - T2) →
L2; Platforms	Island platform
L2; Platforms	Platform 1	← Towards Cuffe Parade (CSMI Airport - T1)

== Entry/Exit ==
- A1 - Western Express Highway, Marol
- A2/A3 - Sahar Village, Sahar Cargo
- A4/A5 - Sahar Village, Chakala [J.B Nagar]
- B1 - Sahar Cargo, Chakala [J.B Nagar]

== See also ==
- Mumbai
- Public transport in Mumbai
- List of Mumbai Metro stations
- List of rapid transit systems in India
- List of Metro Systems
