= Siddhivinayak temple =

Siddhivinayak temple may refer to the following Hindu Ganesha temples:

- Siddhivinayak Temple, Siddhatek, Ashtavinayak temple
- Siddhivinayak Temple, Mumbai
- Siddhivinayak Mahaganapati Temple, Titwala, Thane district
- Siddhivinayak metro station, Prabhadevi
