= Siddhivinayak metro station =

Mumbai Metro's Aqua Line metro station

Siddhivinayak
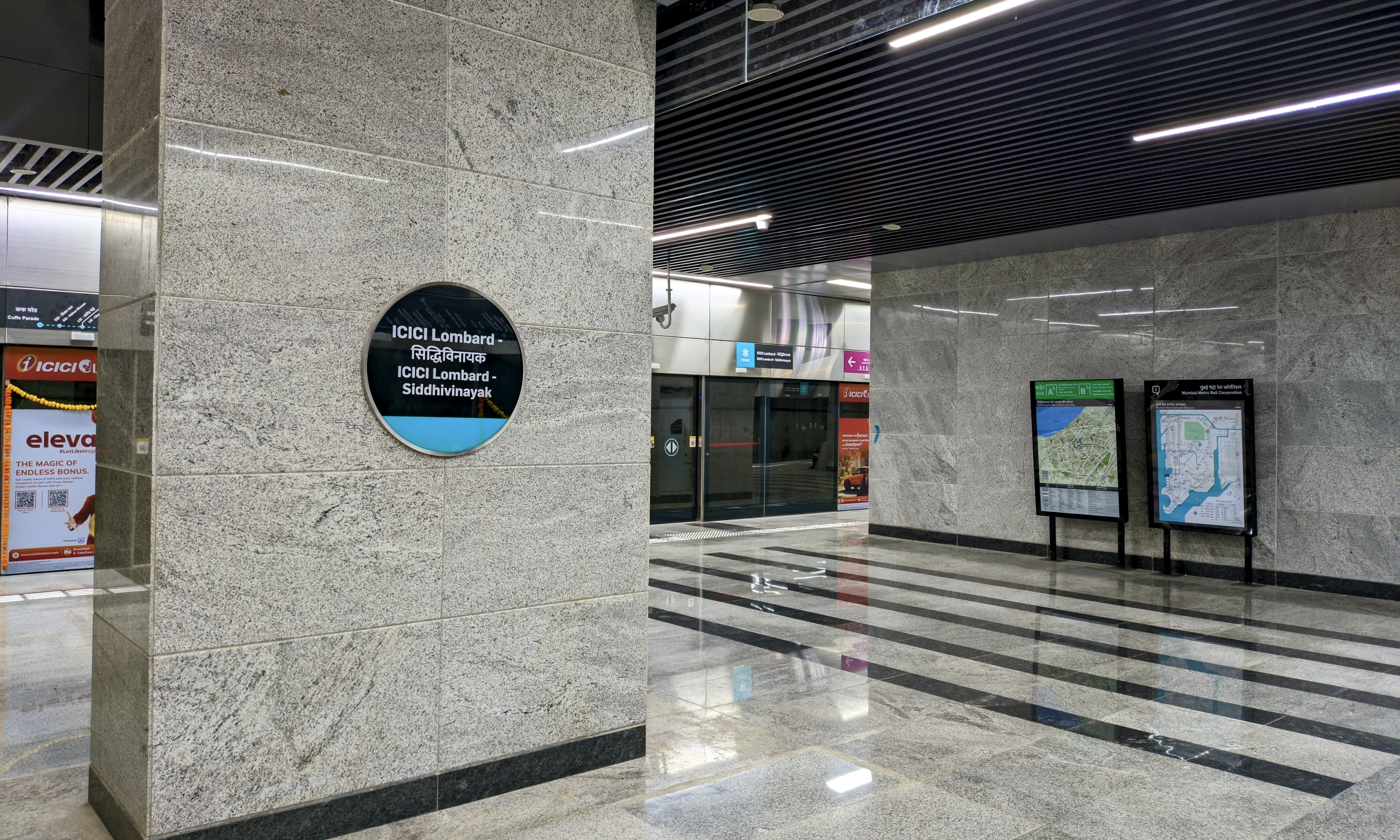
- Platform level of metro station

General information
- Location: SK Bole Rd, Prabhadevi, Mumbai, Maharashtra 400028
- Coordinates: 19°00′57″N 72°49′50″E
- Owner: Mumbai Metro Rail Corporation Ltd.
- Operator: Delhi Metro Rail Corporation
- Line: Line 3
- Platforms: 1 island platform

Construction
- Structure type: Underground
- Accessible: Yes

Other information
- Status: Staffed, Operational
- Station code: SIDV

History
- Opened: 10 May 2025; 17 months ago

Services
Preceding station	Mumbai Metro	Following station
Worli towards Cuffe Parade	Line 3	Dadar towards Aarey JVLR
Track layout
Location

Siddhivinayak (also known as ICICI Lombard - Siddhivinayak for sponsorship reasons) is an underground metro station located in the Prabhadevi area, on the North–South corridor of the Aqua Line 3 of the Mumbai Metro in Mumbai, India. The station opened to the public on 10 May 2025, under a naming rights agreement between ICICI Lombard and the Mumbai Metro Rail Corporation Ltd (MMRC).

== Station Layout ==
G	Ground level	Exit/Entrance
L1	Concourse	Customer Service, Shops, Vending machine, ATMs
L2; Platforms	Platform 2	Towards Aarey JVLR (Dadar) →
L2; Platforms	Island platform
L2; Platforms	Platform 1	← Towards Cuffe Parade (Worli)

== Entry/Exit ==
- A1/A2/A3 - Shree Siddhivinayak Mandir, Sane Guruji Vidyalaya
- A4 - Shree Siddhivinayak Mandir, Kakasaheb Gadgil Marg
- A5 - Ravindra Natya Mandir, Sayani Marg
- B1 - Kakasaheb Gadgil Marg, Convent Girls High School
- B2 - Rachna Sansad Academy, Appasaheb Marathe Marg

== See also ==
- Mumbai
- Transport in Mumbai
- List of Mumbai Metro stations
- List of rapid transit systems in India
- List of metro systems
