= Chhatrapati Shivaji Maharaj International Airport - T2 metro station =

Mumbai Metro's Aqua Line metro station

Chhatrapati Shivaji Maharaj International Airport - T2
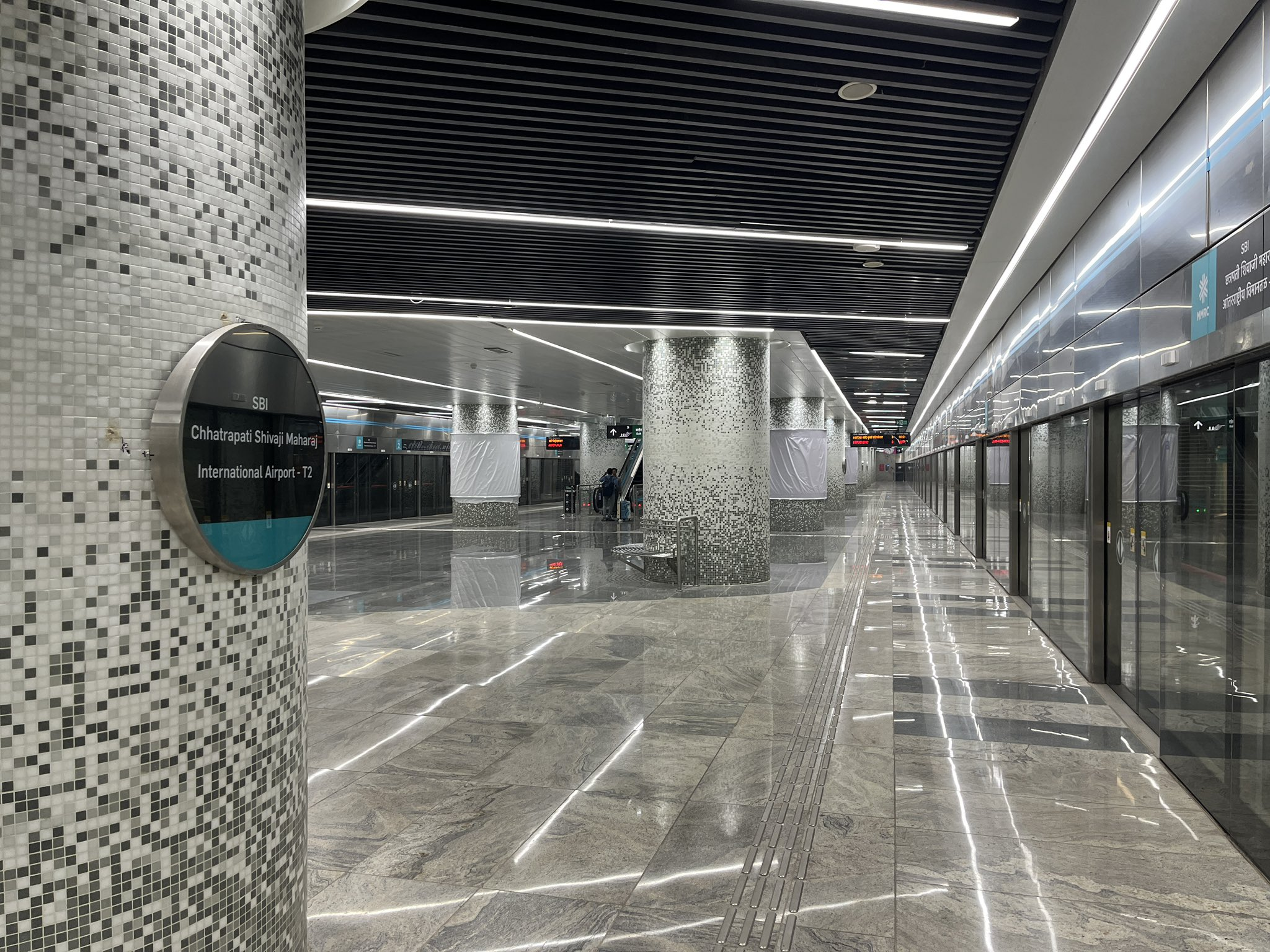
- Platform 1 of CSMI Airport - T2 station in December 2024

General information
- Other names: CSMIA - T2
- Location: Navpada, Vile Parle East, Vile Parle, Mumbai, Maharashtra 400099
- Coordinates: 19°06′08″N 72°52′28″E
- Owner: Mumbai Metro Rail Corporation Ltd.
- Line: Line 3
- Platforms: 1 island platform
- Connections: Line 7A (Under–construction); Chhatrapati Shivaji Maharaj International Airport

Construction
- Structure type: Underground
- Depth: 26.5 m (87 ft)
- Accessible: Yes

Other information
- Status: Staffed, operational
- Station code: CSIA

History
- Opened: 7 October 2024; 2 years ago

Services
Preceding station	Mumbai Metro	Following station
Sahar Road towards Cuffe Parade	Line 3	Marol Naka towards Aarey JVLR
Track layout
Location

Chhatrapati Shivaji Maharaj International Airport - T2 (also called as CSMI Airport - T2) is an underground metro station of the Aqua Line 3 of Mumbai Metro in Mumbai, India. It was opened to public on 7 October 2024.

== History ==
=== Planning and development ===
The station's conception dates back to early planning phases of Mumbai Metro’s Aqua Line 3, when the Mumbai International Airport Limited (MIAL) proposed a financial partnership to integrate a metro station directly with T2. In August 2022, the Government of Maharashtra approved a significant cost escalation of over ₹10,000 crore for the Aqua Line 3 project, as reported by The Times of India.

MIAL committed to funding three key stations—T2, Marol Naka, and Sahar Road—with an estimated contribution of ₹777 crore. To recover this amount, a ‘metro component’ was added to the User Development Fee (UDF) charged to air passengers between 2016 and February 2023, according to a report by the Financial Express.

=== Construction and features ===
Construction of the station was undertaken by the Mumbai Metro Rail Corporation (MMRC) as part of the broader Aqua Line 3 project. The station includes modern commuter amenities such as customer service counters, escalators, lifts, shops, ATMs, and multiple entry/exit points to accommodate peak-time passenger flow. The station is also set to host India's longest escalator, at 21 metres in length.

When first opened, the metro station was located 500 meters away from the airport terminal along poorly signposted public roads. A direct bridge from Exit 1A to the airport terminal opened in August 2025, reducing the distance to 100 meters.

=== Operational milestones ===
The station was opened to the public on 7 October 2024 as part of Phase 1 of Aqua Line 3, which connected Aarey to Bandra-Kurla Complex (BKC). This marked a major milestone in expanding Mumbai’s rapid transit network and improving airport accessibility.

== Station layout ==
The metro station is an underground station, located approximately 30 metres below ground near the airport’s Terminal 2 at Sahar. The station is connected directly to T2 through a dedicated 100-metre footbridge, providing a pedestrian link between the underground metro station and the terminal building.

G	Ground level	Exit/entrance
C	Concourse	Customer service, shops, vending machine, ATMs
P Platforms	Platform 2	Towards Aarey JVLR (Marol Naka) →
P Platforms	Island platform, doors will open on the right
P Platforms	Platform 1	← Towards Cuffe Parade (Sahar Road)

=== Entrances/exits ===
- A1/A2 - Sahar Cargo, Chhatrapati Shivaji Maharaj International Airport - T2
- B1 - Chhatrapati Shivaji Maharaj International Airport - T2, Yellow Fever Hospital
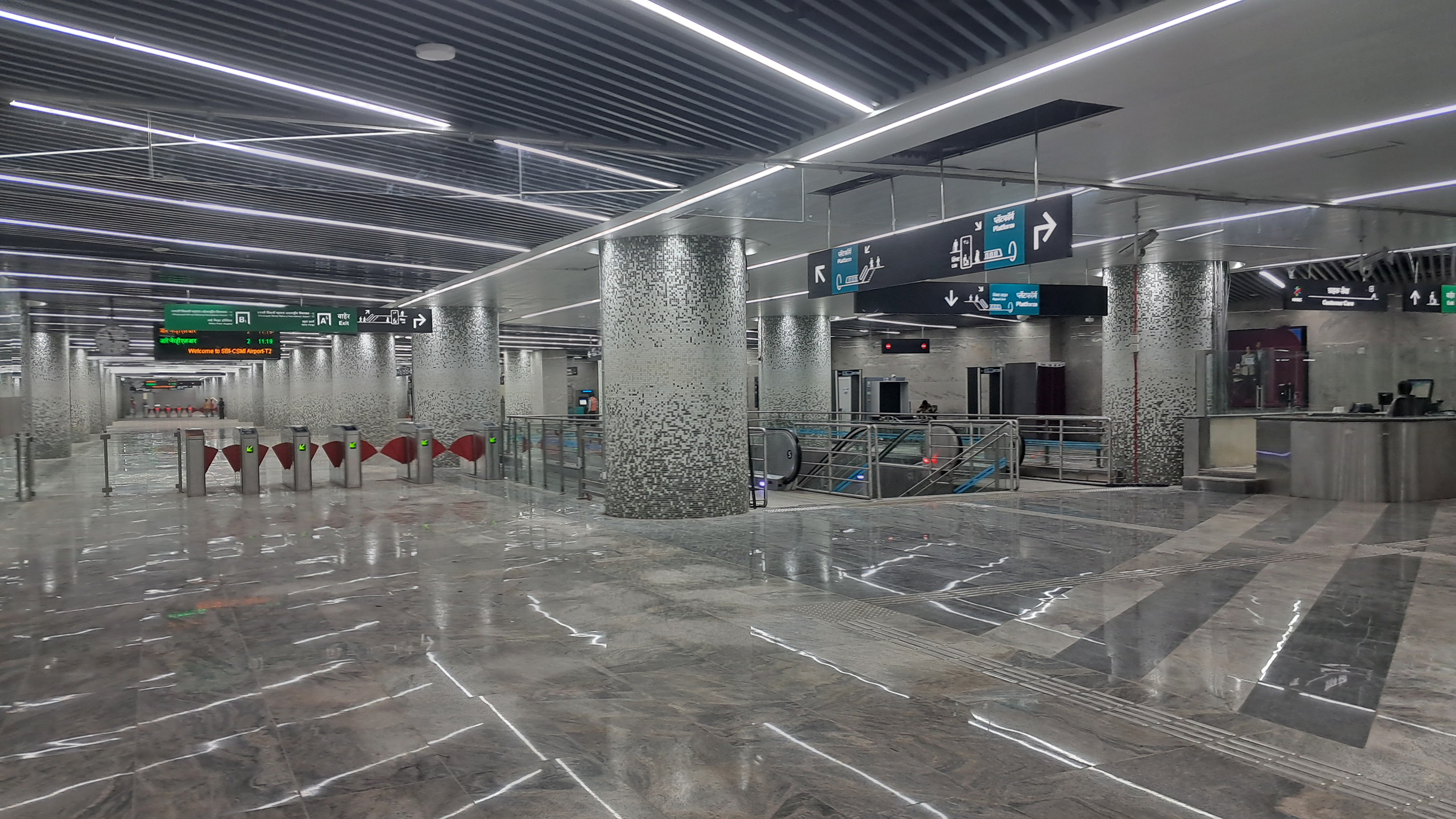
station concourse

== See also ==
- Mumbai
- Public transport in Mumbai
- List of Mumbai Metro stations
- List of rapid transit systems in India
- List of Metro Systems
