= Poisar metro station =

Mumbai Metro's Red Line 7 metro station

705 Poisar पोईसर
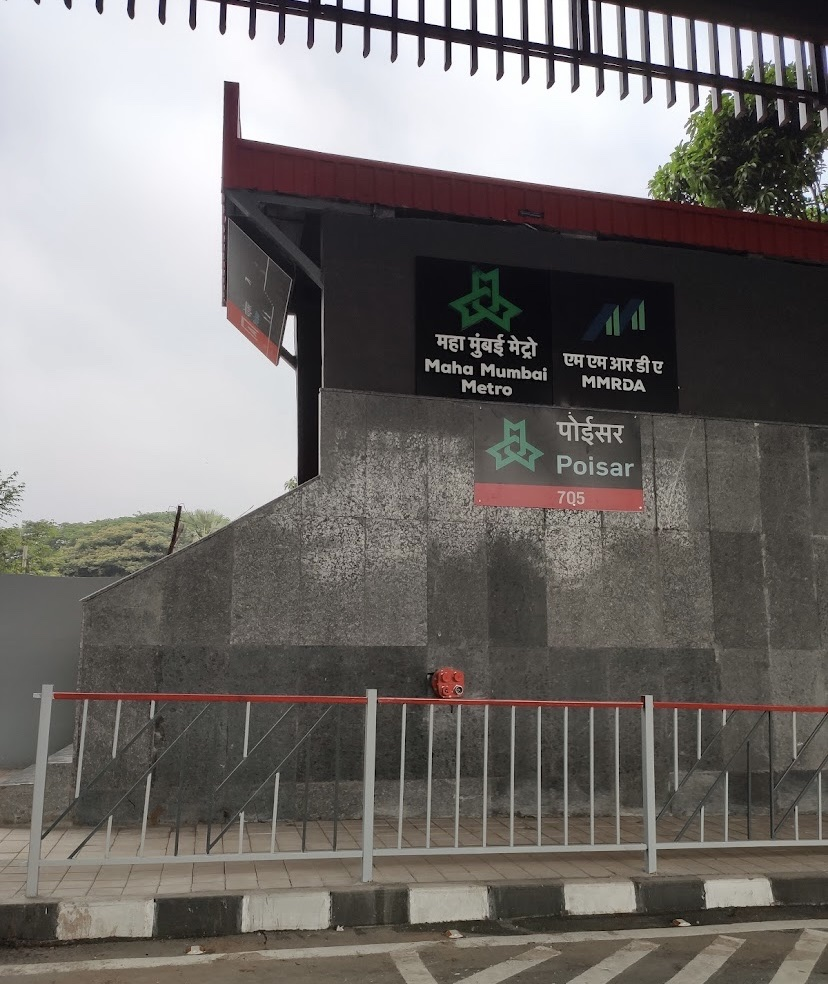

General information
- Location: Kandivali, Defence Colony, Kandivali East, Mumbai, Maharashtra 400101
- Coordinates: 19°12′14″N 72°51′48″E
- Operator: Maha Mumbai Metro Operation Corporation Ltd.
- Line: Line 7
- Platforms: 2 side platforms

Construction
- Structure type: Elevated
- Parking: No
- Accessible: Yes

History
- Opened: 2 April 2022; 4 years ago

Services
Preceding station	Mumbai Metro	Following station
Magathane towards Dahisar (East)	Line 7	Akurli towards Gundavali
Route map
Red Line
Location

Poisar is an elevated metro station on the north–south corridor of the Red Line 7 of Mumbai Metro in Mumbai, India. This metro station was inaugurated on 2 April 2022 by Prime Minister Narendra Modi.

== Station layout ==
2nd Floor	Side platform
2nd Floor	Platform 1	towards Gundavali →
2nd Floor	Platform 2	← towards Dahisar (East)
2nd Floor	Side platform
1st Floor	Mezzanine	Fare control, station agent, Metro QR ticket vending machines, crossover
Ground	Street level	Exit/Entrance

=== Power and signaling system ===
Like all other stations and railways of Mumbai metro, Poisar station also uses 25,000 volt AC power system by overhead catenary to operate the trains.

== See also ==
- Mumbai
- List of Mumbai Metro stations
- Transport in Mumbai
- List of metro systems
- List of rapid transit systems in India
- M-Indicator
