= Mogra metro station =

Mumbai Metro's Red Line 7 metro station

Mogra मोगरा
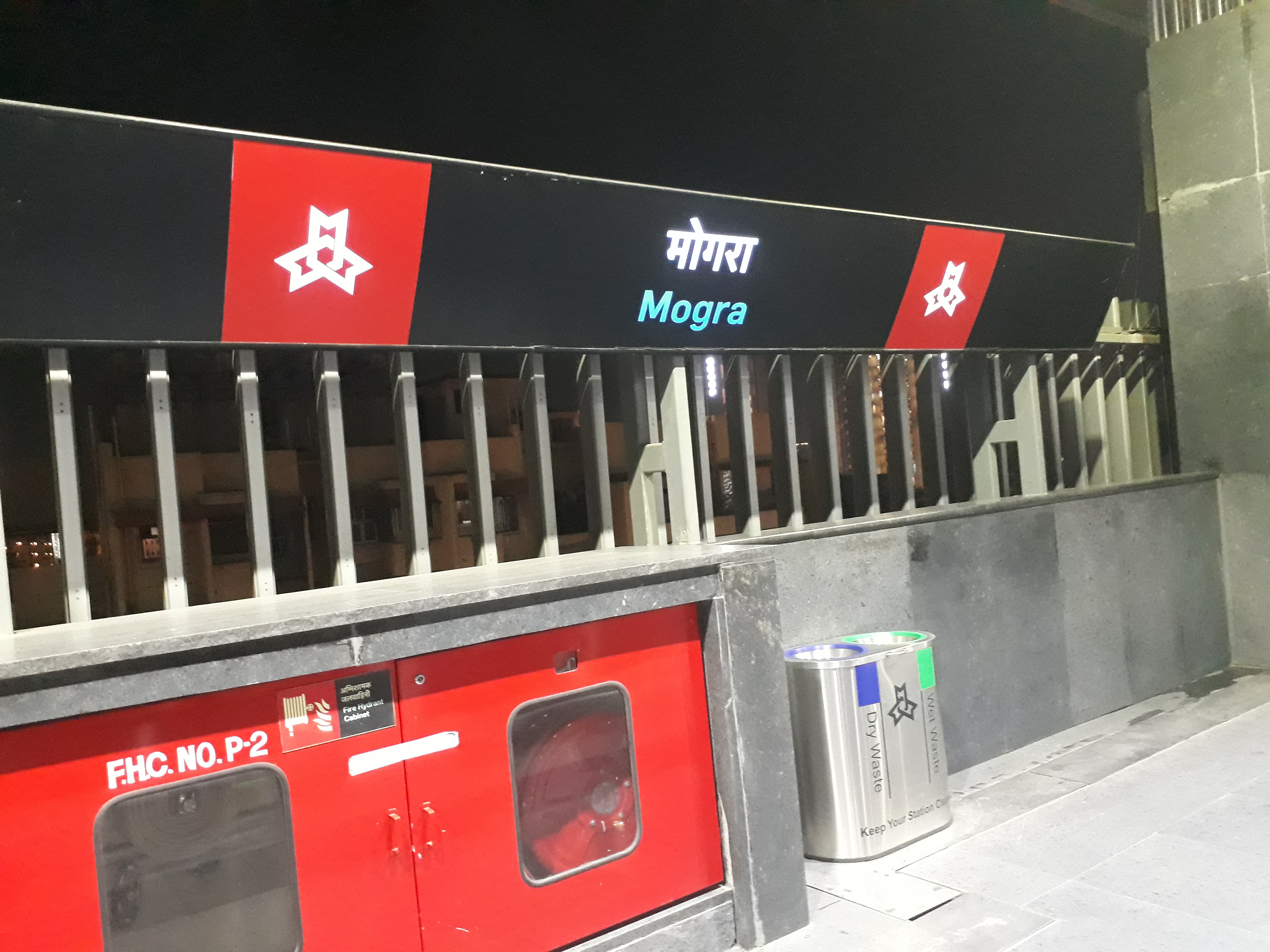

General information
- Location: Saraswati Baug, Shankarwadi, Jogeshwari East, Mumbai, Maharashtra 400060
- Coordinates: 19°07′44″N 72°51′19″E
- Owner: Mumbai Metropolitan Region Development Authority
- Operator: Maha Mumbai Metro Operation Corporation Ltd.
- Line: 7-Red Line
- Platforms: 2 side platforms

Construction
- Structure type: Elevated
- Parking: No

Other information
- Station code: 712

History
- Opened: 20 January 2023; 3 years ago

Services
| Preceding station | Mumbai Metro | Following station |
|---|---|---|
| Jogeshwari East 711 towards Dahisar (East) | 7-Red Line | Gundavali 713 Terminus |
Route map
Red Line
Location

Mogra is an elevated metro station on the North-South corridor of the Red Line 7 of Mumbai Metro in Mumbai, India. This metro station was inaugurated on 20 January 2023 by Prime Minister Narendra Modi.

== Station layout ==
| 2nd Floor | Side platform |
| 2nd Floor | Platform 1 | towards Gundavali (terminus) → |
| 2nd Floor | Platform 2 | ← towards Dahisar (East) (Jogeshwari (East)) |
| 2nd Floor | Side platform |
| 1st Floor | Mezzanine | Fare control, station agent, Metro QR ticket vending machines, crossover |
| Ground | Street level | Exit/Entrance |

=== Power and signaling system ===
Like all other stations and railways of Mumbai metro, Mogra station also uses 25,000 volt AC power system by overhead catenary to operate the trains.

== See also ==
- Mumbai
- List of Mumbai Metro stations
- Transport in Mumbai
- List of metro systems
- List of rapid transit systems in India
- M-Indicator
