= Maratha Mandir =

CInema hall in Mumbai, India

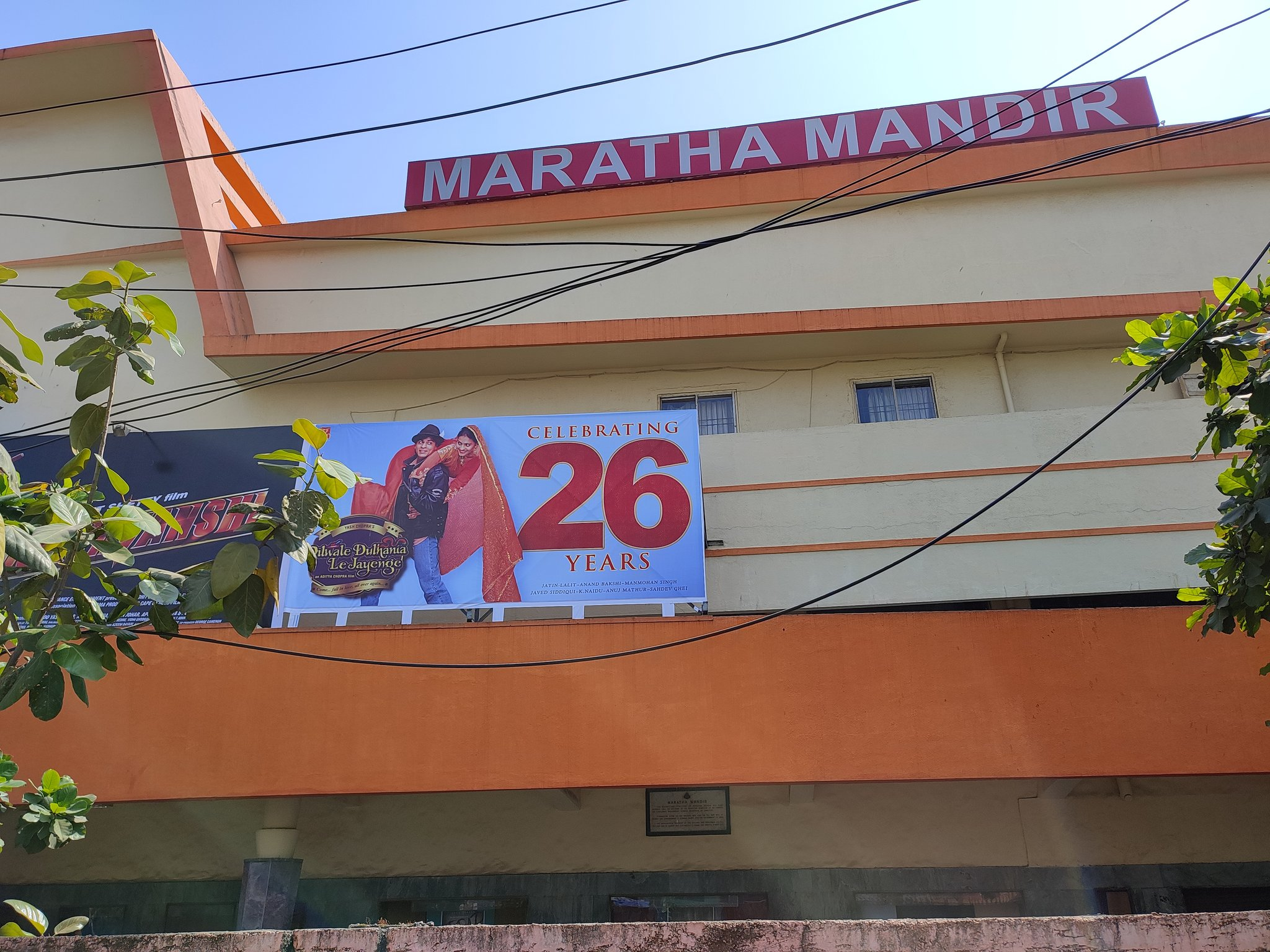
- Maratha Mandir in 2021, with a billboard advertising its run of Dilwale Dulhania Le Jayenge

- Location within Mumbai
- Address: Maratha Mandir Marg, Reserve Bank of India Staff Quarters Byculla, Mumbai, Maharashtra, India
- Coordinates: 18.971183°N 72.822134°E
- Owner: Maratha Mandir Trust
- Capacity: 1000
- Public transit: Western Mumbai Central; Jagannath Shankar Sheth Metro

Construction
- Opened: 16 October 1945

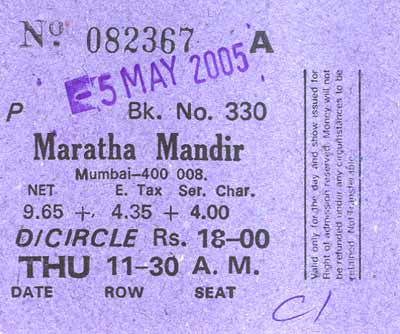
A film ticket of Maratha Mandir on 5 May 2005

Maratha Mandir is a cinema hall located in Maratha Mandir Marg, Reserve Bank of India Staff Quarters Byculla, Mumbai, Maharashtra, India. Maratha Mandir was opened on 16 October 1945 and has 1000 seats. In the 1960s and 1970s, Maratha Mandir was known for its lavish film launches, with the particularly grand launch of Mughal-e-Azam in 1960 being a highlight. The introduction of multiplexes diverted "class" viewers from establishment with the "masses" of the working class patronizing the theatre instead. Maratha Mandir is currently known for continuously showing Dilwale Dulhania Le Jayenge daily since its release on 20 October 1995, and the film's run there remains ongoing as of 2026. It is one of the most well-known landmarks in Mumbai.

It was started by the Scindia Royal Family and the legendary Babasaheb Gawde, a.k.a, G.G Gawde. It has been the second instalment of the Maratha Mandir Trust.

It is part of the larger known Maratha Mandir Trust, which has been asserted as a well-known and philanthropic trust, as of on going 2026. The trust is chaired by Hon. Rajendra P. Gawde.

== See also ==
- Yash Raj Films
- Metro Cinema (Kolkata)
- Shah Rukh Khan
