= Acharya Atre Chowk metro station =

Metro station on Mumbai Metro's Aqua Line

Acharya Atre Chowk
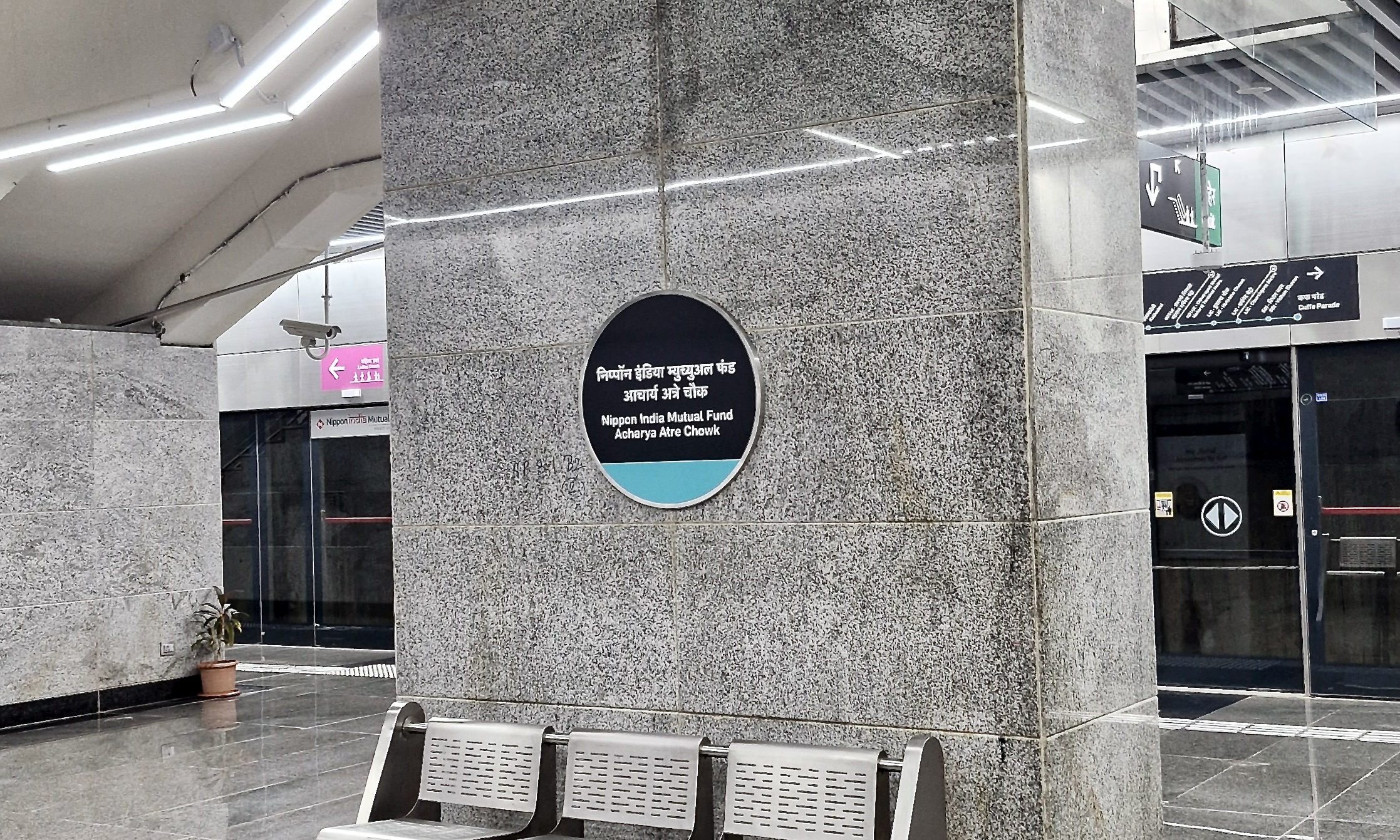
- Acharya Atre Chowk metro station platform

General information
- Location: Acharya Atre Chowk, Worli Naka, Mumbai, Maharashtra, 400025
- Coordinates: 18°59′50″N 72°49′05″E
- Owner: Mumbai Metro Rail Corporation Ltd.
- Line: Line 3
- Platforms: 1 island platform

Construction
- Structure type: Underground
- Accessible: Yes

Other information
- Status: Staffed, Operational
- Station code: ACA

History
- Opened: 10 May 2025; 17 months ago

Services
Preceding station	Mumbai Metro	Following station
Science Centre towards Cuffe Parade	Line 3	Worli towards Aarey JVLR
Track layout
Location

Acharya Atre Chowk (also known as Nippon India Mutual Fund Acharya Atre Chowk for sponsorship reasons) is an underground metro station located in the Worli area of Mumbai, India. It serves the North–South corridor of the Aqua Line 3 of the Mumbai Metro. The station commenced operations on 10 May 2025, as part of Phase 2A of the Aqua Line 3, extending service from Bandra Kurla Complex (BKC) to Acharya Atre Chowk.

The station was inaugurated under a naming rights agreement between Nippon India Mutual Fund and the Mumbai Metro Rail Corporation Ltd (MMRCL). The five-year agreement grants Nippon India Mutual Fund exclusive branding rights, including the prefixing of its name to the station, branding within the station premises, and mentions in train announcements and station maps.

On 26 May 2025, the station experienced flooding due to intense monsoon rains, leading to the suspension of metro services along the affected stretch. The incident highlighted concerns regarding water management and drainage systems at the station.

== Last-Mile Connectivity Initiatives ==
MMRDA is planning the implementation of a network of subways to enhance last-mile connectivity for the Mumbai Metro. These subways are intended to directly link Metro stations with high-density commercial zones, suburban railway stations, and bus stops, providing commuters with seamless and weather-protected access.

These underground pedestrian links are designed to incorporate amenities such as escalators and elevators to ensure accessibility. A key component of this initiative includes a proposed 1-kilometer-long subway connecting this underground station to the Mahalaxmi Racecourse and the Coastal Road's parking facility at Haji Ali. This specific subway plan also features a 160-meter branch arm intended to connect to adjacent open spaces. The MMRDA has indicated that pilot projects at select locations will precede a wider rollout of these connectivity solutions.

== Station layout ==
G	Ground level	Exit/Entrance
C	Concourse	Customer Service, Shops, Vending machine, ATMs
P Platforms	Platform 2	Towards Aarey JVLR (Worli) →
P Platforms	Island platform, doors will open on the right
P Platforms	Platform 1	← Towards Cuffe Parade (Science Centre)

=== Entrances and exits ===
- A1 – MCGM Engineering Hub, Nehru Science Centre
- A2 – MCGM Worli Engineering Hub
- A3/B1 – Konark Express
- A4 – Mahanagar Palika Yangraha Bus Stop, Ambe International Humane
- B2 – Acharya Atre Chowk
- B3 – Atria Mall, Nehru Planetarium
- B4 – RTO-Regional Transport Office, Worli, Dairy Development Department
- B5 – Consulate General of Republic of Korea [South Korea], Acharya Atre Chowk
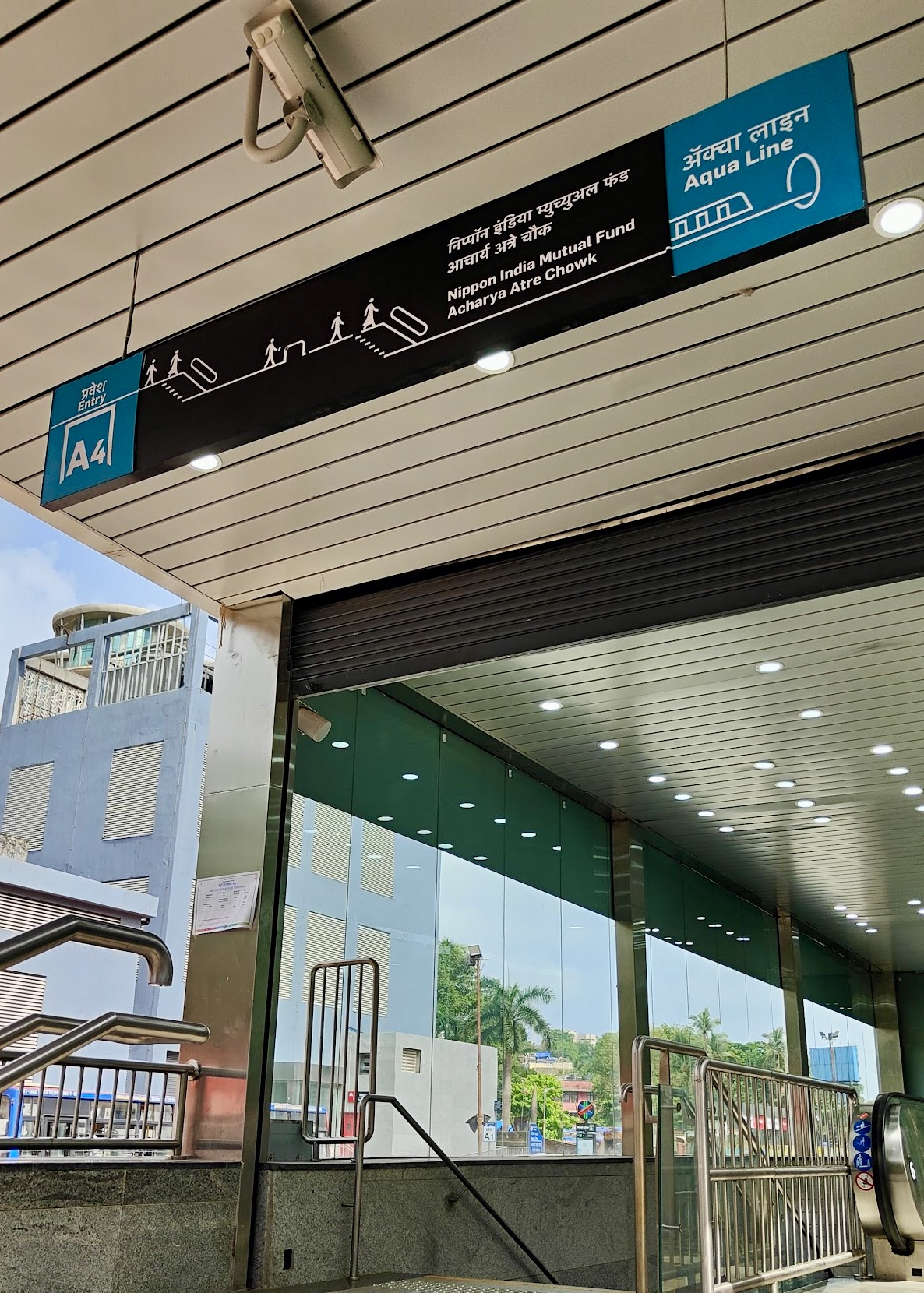
Entrance A4

== See also ==
- Mumbai
- Transport in Mumbai
- List of Mumbai Metro stations
- List of rapid transit systems in India
- List of metro systems
