= Gundavali metro station =

Mumbai Metro's Red Line 7 terminal metro station

Gundavali गुंदवली
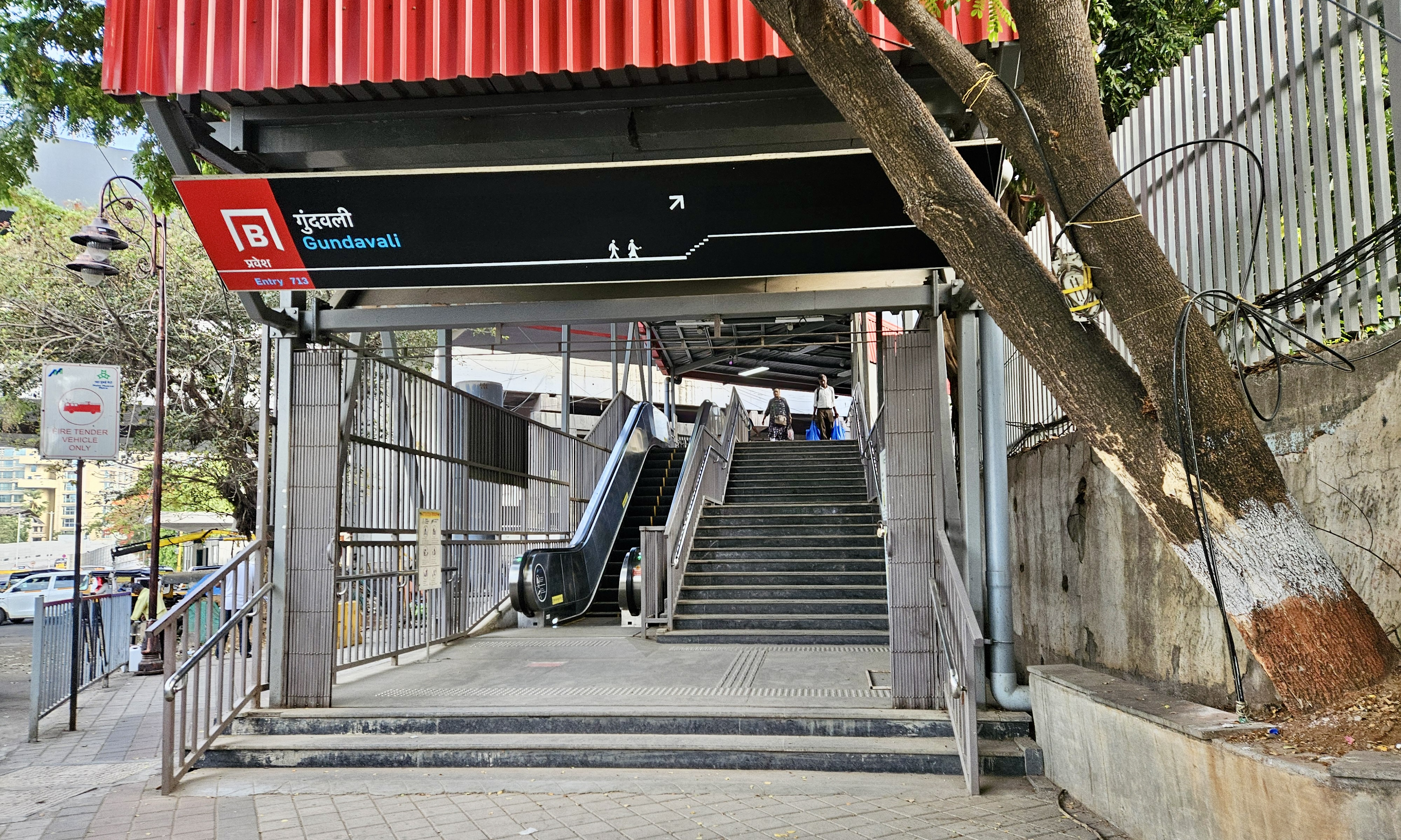
- Entrance B of Gundavali metro station

General information
- Other names: Andheri (East)
- Location: Andheri East, Mumbai, Maharashtra 400053
- Coordinates: 19°06′54″N 72°51′19″E
- Owner: Mumbai Metropolitan Region Development Authority
- Operator: Maha Mumbai Metro Operation Corporation Ltd.
- Lines: Line 7; Line 7A (Under-construction)
- Platforms: 2 side platforms
- Connections: Line 1 at WEH

Construction
- Structure type: Elevated
- Parking: No
- Accessible: Yes

Other information
- Station code: 713

History
- Opened: 20 January 2023; 3 years ago

Services
Preceding station	Mumbai Metro	Following station
Mogra 712 towards Dahisar (East)	Line 7	Terminus
Terminus	Line 7A (under construction)	Airport Colony towards Chhatrapati Shivaji Maharaj International Airport - T2
Route map
Red Line
Location

Gundavali is the elevated southern terminal metro station on the North-South corridor of the Red Line 7 of Mumbai Metro in Mumbai, India. This metro station was inaugurated on 20 January 2023 by Prime Minister Narendra Modi.

Gundavali is connected to the Western Express Highway station on Line 1 through a 58 metre long foot overbridge.

== Station layout ==
2nd Floor	Side platform
2nd Floor	Platform 1	Alighting only →
2nd Floor	Platform 2	← towards Dahisar (East) (Mogra)
2nd Floor	Side platform
1st Floor	Mezzanine	Fare control, station agent, Metro QR ticket vending machines, crossover
Ground	Street level	Exit/Entrance

=== Power and signaling system ===
Like all other stations and railways of Mumbai metro, Gundavali station also uses 25,000 volt AC power system by overhead catenary to operate the trains.

== Gallery ==
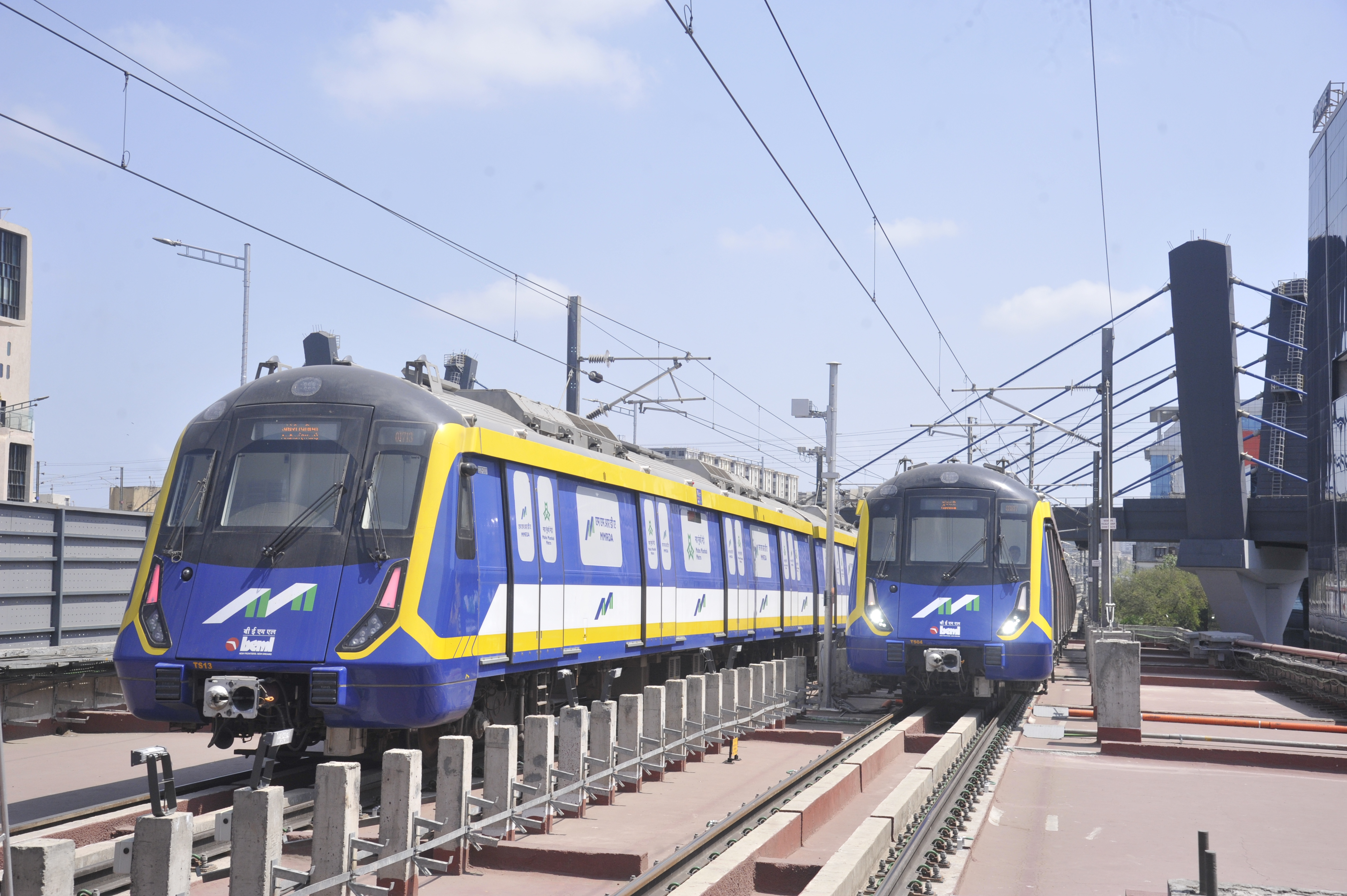
Mumbai Metro at Gundavali Station

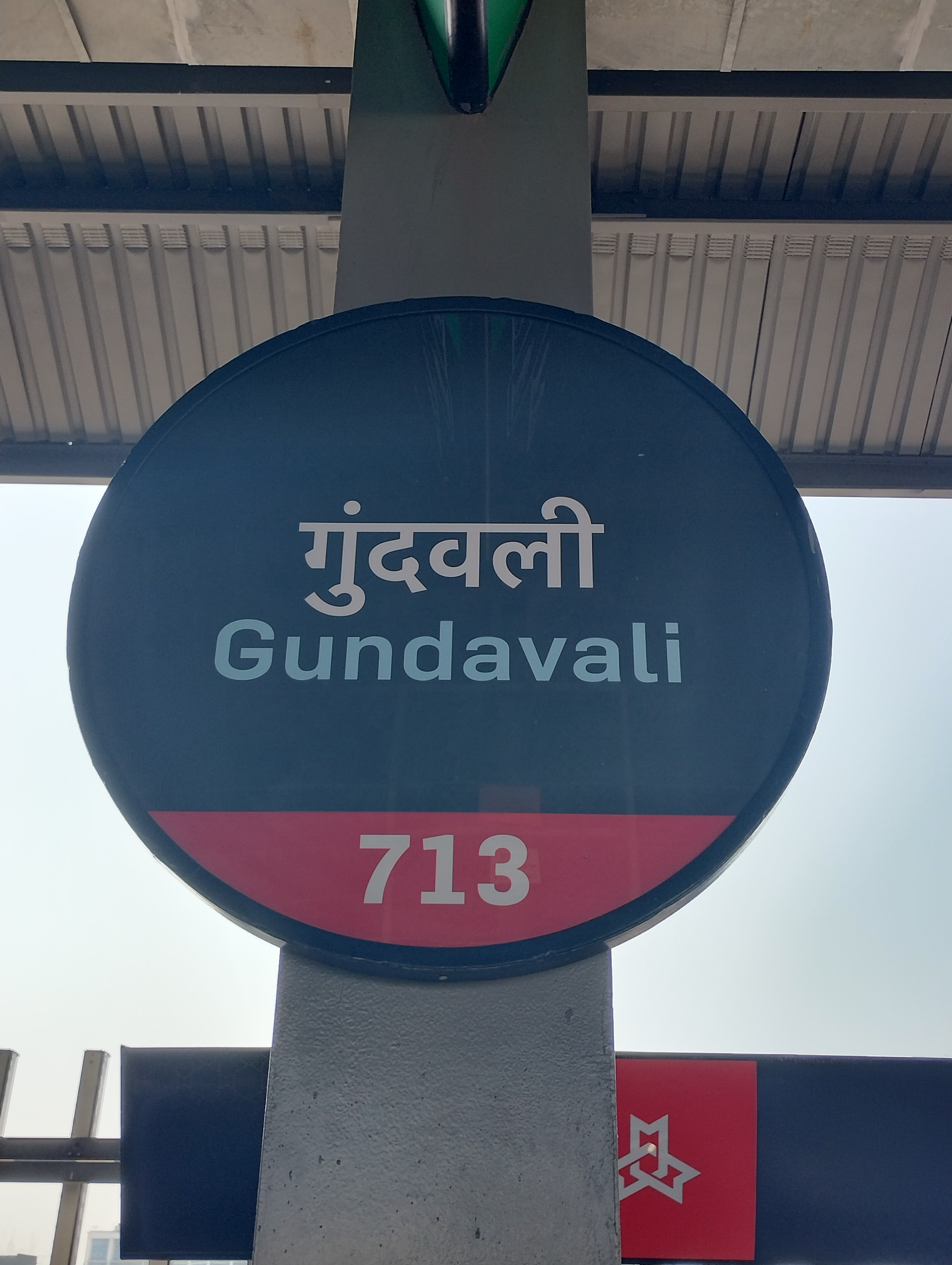
Gundavali metro station

== See also ==
- Mumbai
- List of Mumbai Metro stations
- Transport in Mumbai
- List of metro systems
- List of rapid transit systems in India
- M-Indicator
