= Cuffe Parade metro station =

Metro station in Mumbai, India

Cuffe Parade
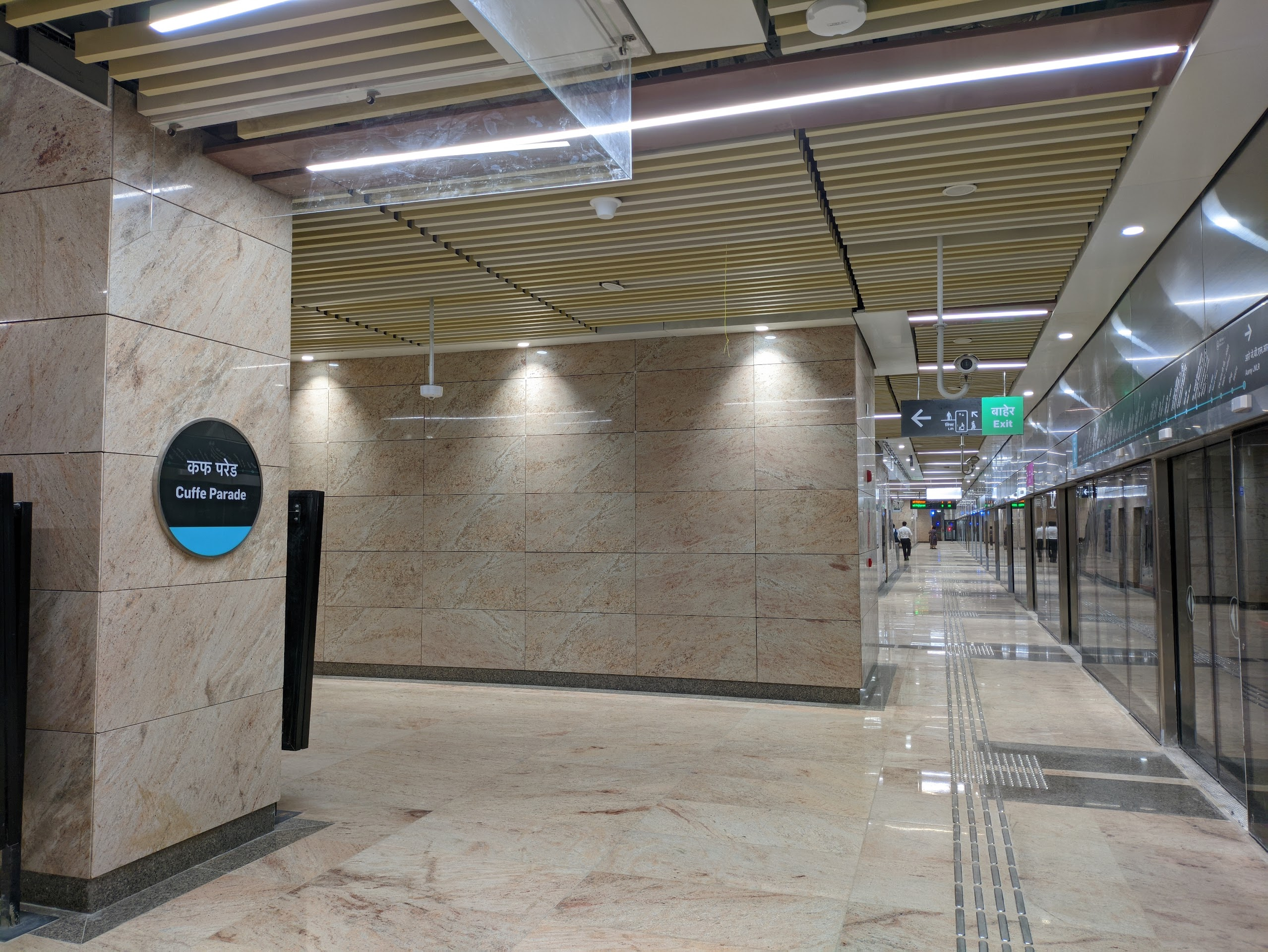
- Platform level of the station

General information
- Location: Ganesh Murti Nagar, Colaba, Mumbai, Maharashtra 400005
- Coordinates: 18°54′51″N 72°49′17″E
- Owner: Mumbai Metro Rail Corporation Ltd.
- Line: Line 3
- Platforms: 1 island platform

Construction
- Structure type: Underground
- Accessible: Yes
- Architect: StudioPOD

Other information
- Status: Staffed, Operational
- Station code: CUP

History
- Opened: 9 October 2025; 11 months ago

Services
Preceding station	Mumbai Metro	Following station
Terminus	Line 3	Vidhan Bhavan towards Aarey JVLR
Track layout
Location

Cuffe Parade is an underground terminal metro station located in the Colaba neighborhood, on the North–South corridor of the Aqua Line of the Mumbai Metro in Mumbai, India. The station was opened to public on 9 October 2025, along with the remaining section of the Aqua Line from Acharya Atre Chowk to Cuffe Parade.

== Station Layout ==
The conceptual and architectural design for the Cuffe Parade metro station was developed by the urban design firm StudioPOD, with architect Sachin Daga serving as a principal designer.

Unlike standard transit stations, the facility was planned as a multi-use transit hub to maximize non-fare box revenue and enhance public utility. The underground station integrates a large open-to-sky sunken plaza into its entrance layout, which serves as a public gathering space and facilitates pedestrian movement. The subterranean levels feature dedicated commercial zones, including retail spaces and restaurant areas designed to encourage foot traffic. Additionally, the station incorporates an integrated multi-level car parking (MLCP) facility to address localized parking demands in the Cuffe Parade commercial district.

G	Ground level	Exit/Entrance
C	Concourse	Customer Service, Shops, Vending machine, ATMs
P Platforms	Platform 2	Towards Aarey JVLR (Vidhan Bhavan) →
P Platforms	Island platform, doors will open on the right
P Platforms	Platform 1	Towards Aarey JVLR (Vidhan Bhavan) →

=== Entrances and exits ===
- A1 - Backbay Bus Depot, Navy Nagar
- A2 - World Trade Center, Colaba Woods Garden
- B1 - Machhimar Nagar, Wodehouse Road
- B2 - President Hotel, GD Somani School
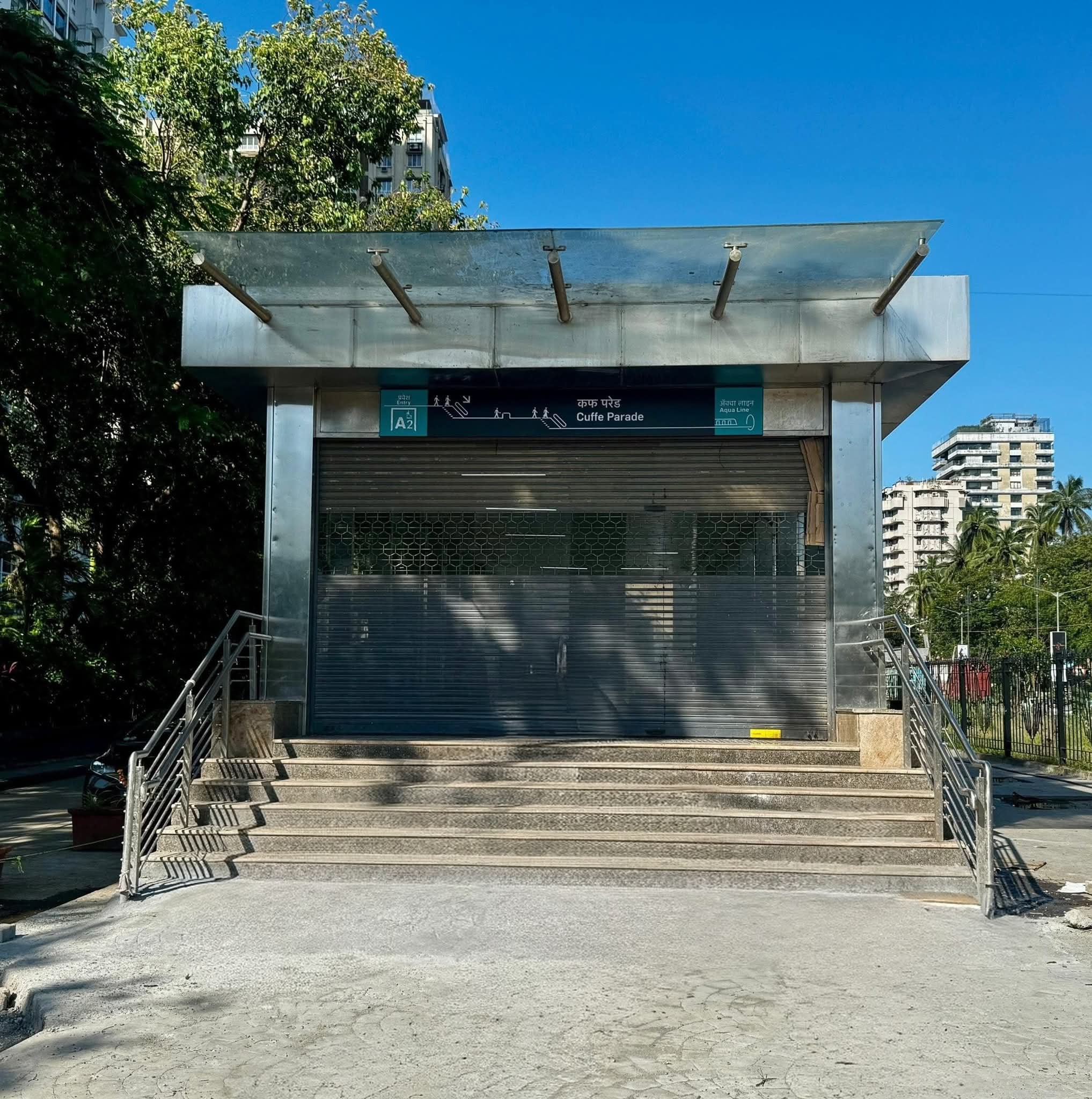
Exit A2

== See also ==
- Mumbai
- Transport in Mumbai
- List of Mumbai Metro stations
- List of rapid transit systems in India
- List of metro systems
