= Aarey JVLR metro station =

Metro terminus in Mumbai, India

Aarey JVLR
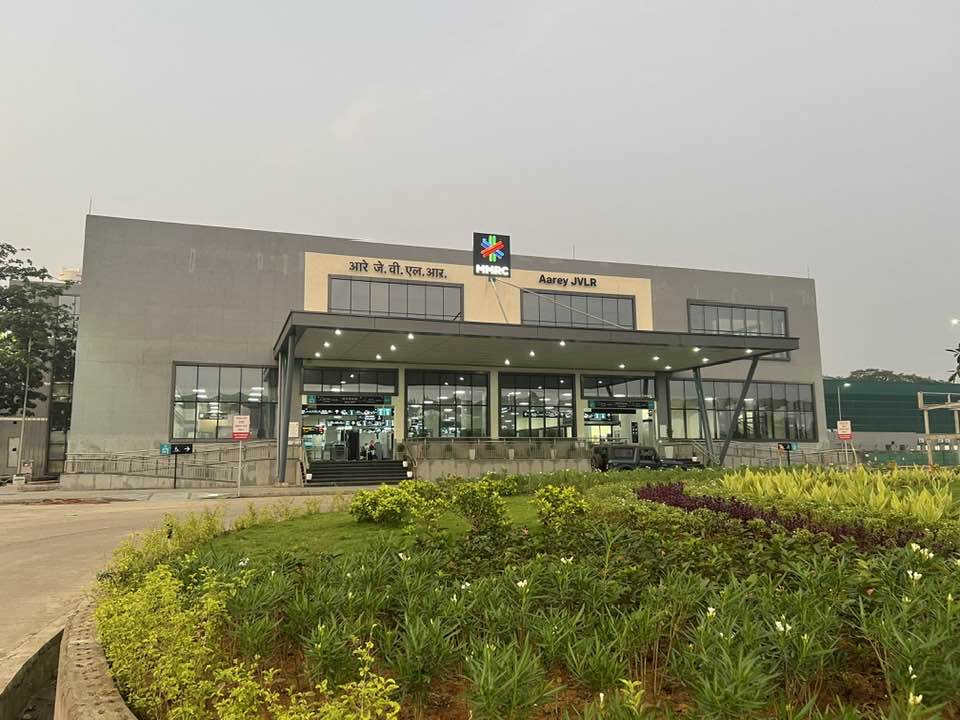
- The station exterior

General information
- Location: Ganesh Nagar, Goregaon, Mumbai, Maharashtra 400065
- Coordinates: 19°07′51″N 72°53′04″E
- Owner: Mumbai Metro Rail Corporation Ltd.
- Line: Line 3
- Platforms: 3 side platforms
- Connections: Line 6 at SEEPZ Village (Under–construction)

Construction
- Structure type: At-grade
- Parking: (TBC)
- Accessible: Yes

Other information
- Status: Staffed, Operational
- Station code: ARYJ

History
- Opened: 5 October 2024; 23 months ago

Services
Preceding station	Mumbai Metro	Following station
SEEPZ towards Cuffe Parade	Line 3	Terminus
Route map
Aqua Line
Location

Aarey JVLR is an At-Grade terminal metro station serving the Ganesh Nagar neighbourhood of Goregaon on the north–south corridor of the Aqua Line 3 of Mumbai Metro in Mumbai, India.

This metro station was inaugurated on October 5, 2024, by Prime Minister Narendra Modi, followed by the commencement of the metro service from October 7, 2024.

== Station layout ==
Platforms 1, 2 and 3 are located at ground level. One platform is designated for boarding, while the others are designated for alighting.

UG1	Subway	Underground subway connecting Platforms 2 and 3 to Platform 1, providing access to exit A1/B1
G Platforms	Depot	MMRC Aarey Depot
G Platforms	Platform 3	Pocket track, alighting only →
G Platforms	Side platform, doors will open on the left
G Platforms	Platform 2	Aqua line terminating trains, alighting only →
G Platforms	Platform 1	← Towards Cuffe Parade (SEEPZ)
G Platforms	Side platform, doors will open on the left
G Platforms	Exits	Exits A1/B1

=== Entrances and exits ===
- A1/B1 - Powai, SEEPZ
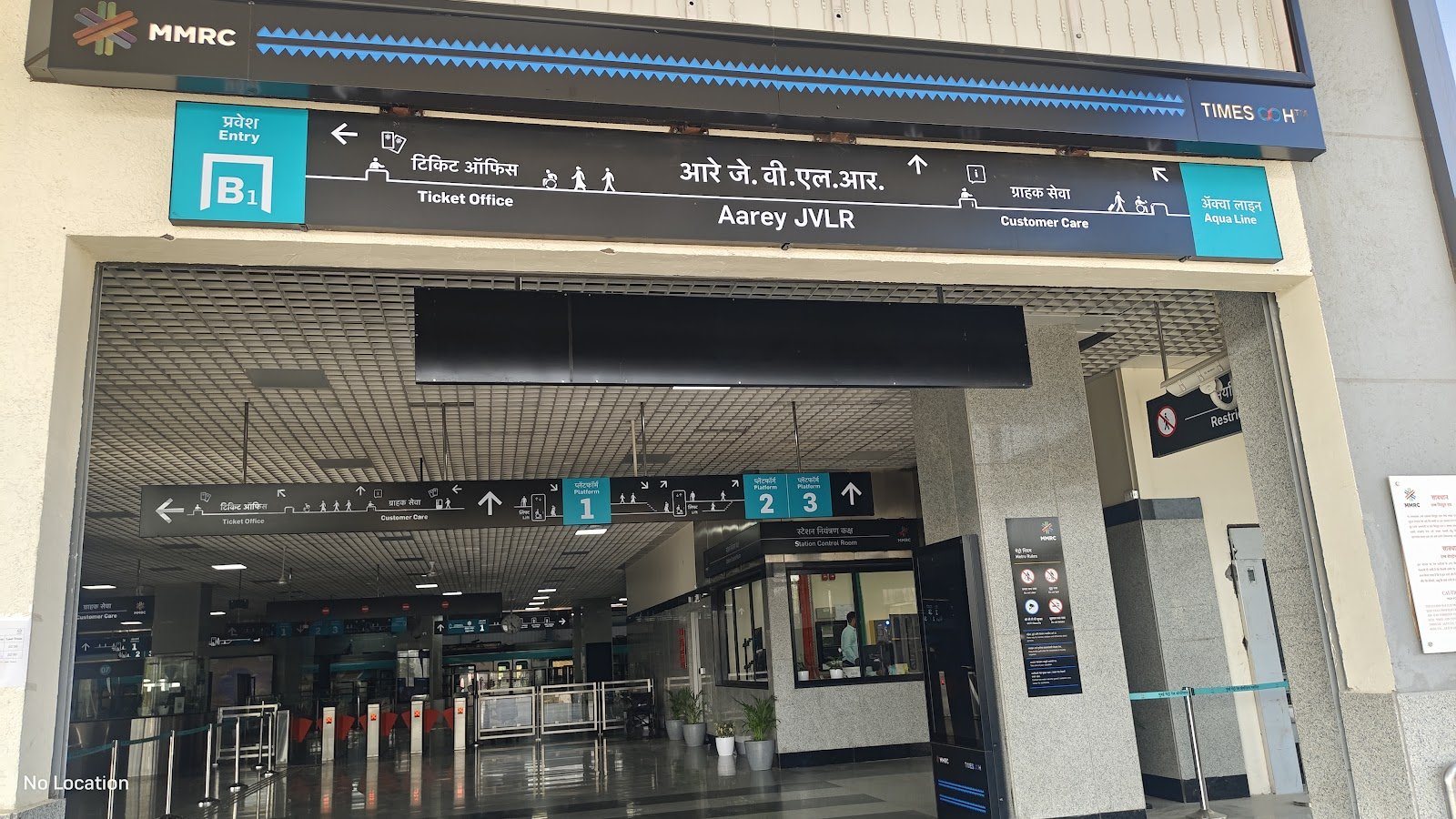
Exit B1

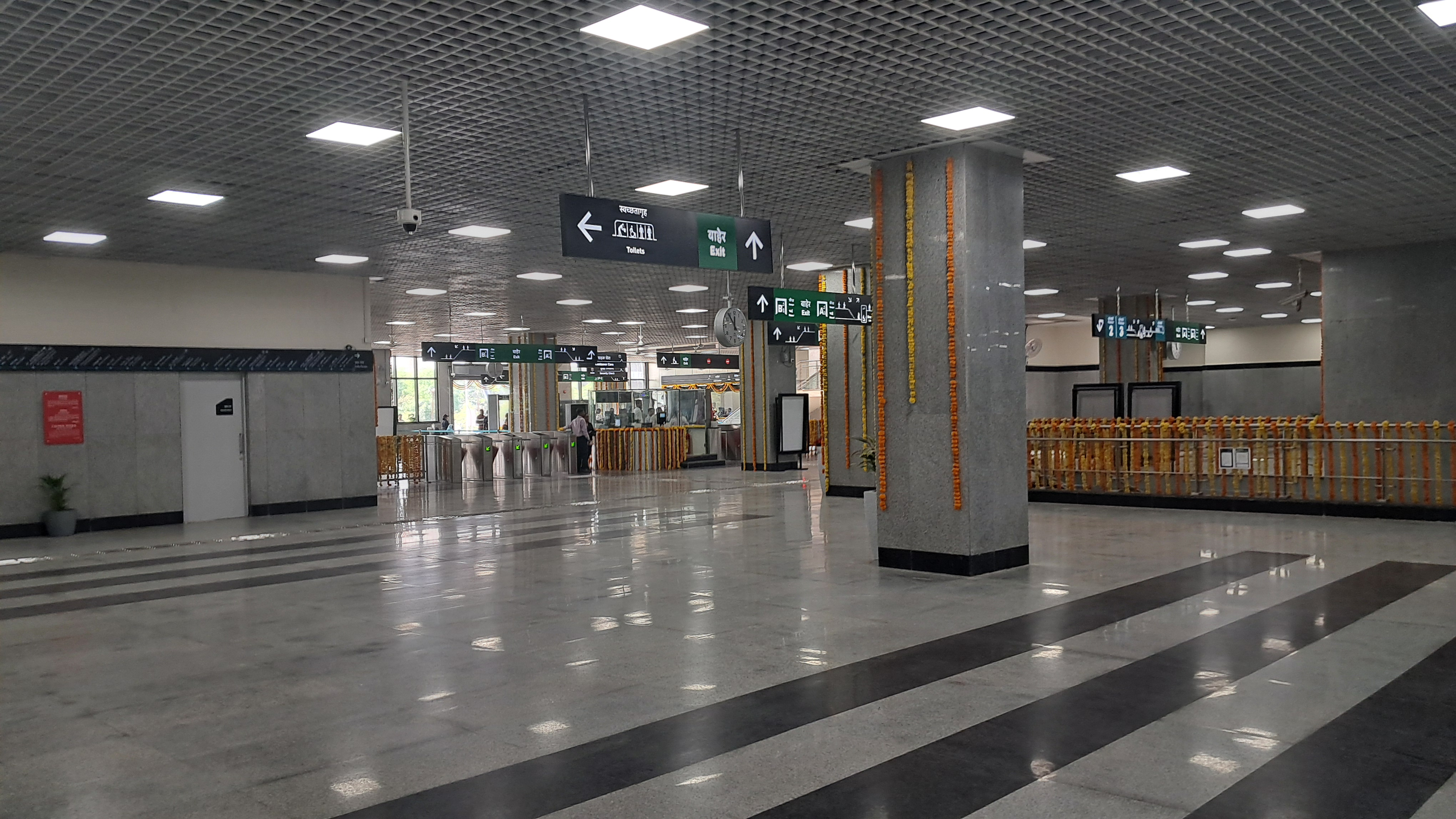
At-grade Concourse

== Connections ==
The Aarey JVLR station will provide connectivity to the under construction Metro line 6 via SEEPZ station.

== See also ==
- Mumbai
- Transport in Mumbai
- List of Mumbai Metro stations
- List of rapid transit systems in India
- List of metro systems
