= Transport in Mumbai =

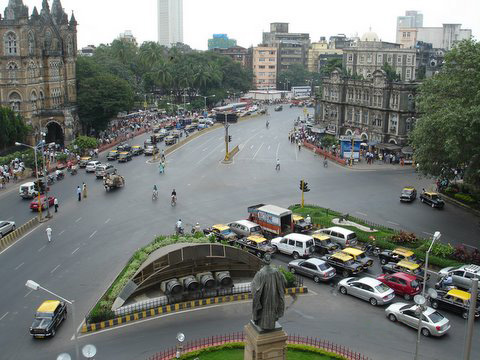
A traffic intersection in Mumbai, 2009

Map, railway lines, ports and airports (Click to enlarge)

Transport in Mumbai is achieved by both public and private transport. As of 2016, 52% of commuters use public transport. Mumbai has the largest organized bus transport network among major Indian cities.

Mumbai's public transport consists primarily of rapid transit on exclusive suburban railway lines augmented by commuter rail on main lines serving outlying suburbs, the bus services of the three municipalities making up the metropolitan area, public taxis and auto rickshaws, as well as ferry services. A metro and a monorail system were inaugurated in 2014. A commercial seaplane service was also introduced in 2014.

== Road ==
=== Sea-links ===
As of 2024, Mumbai currently has 4 major operational or under-construction sea-links:

The Bandra–Worli Sea Link bridge is one of the longest bridges in the country, opened in 2009. It connects the suburbs of Bandra and Worli, and carries around 32,000 vehicles daily as of 2018.

The Mumbai Trans Harbour Link (officially the Shri Atal Bihari Vajpayee Sewri-Nhava Sheva Atal Setu) is the longest bridge in India. It was opened on 12 January 2024, when Prime Minister Narendra Modi inaugurated the bridge. It connects Mumbai with Navi Mumbai and is 21.8 kilometers in length. The bridge runs between the localities of Sewri in South Mumbai to Ulwe of Navi Mumbai.

The Coastal Road (officially the Chhatrapati Sambhaji Maharaj Coastal Motorway) is an 8-lane, 29.2 km long expressway that runs along Mumbai's western coastline. It will connect the locality of Marine Lines in the south to Mumbai and Kandivali in the North. It is projected to be used by 130,000 vehicles daily and reduces travel time between South Mumbai and the Western Suburbs from 2 hours to 40 minutes. Its first phase was inaugurated on 11 March 2024.

=== Bus ===
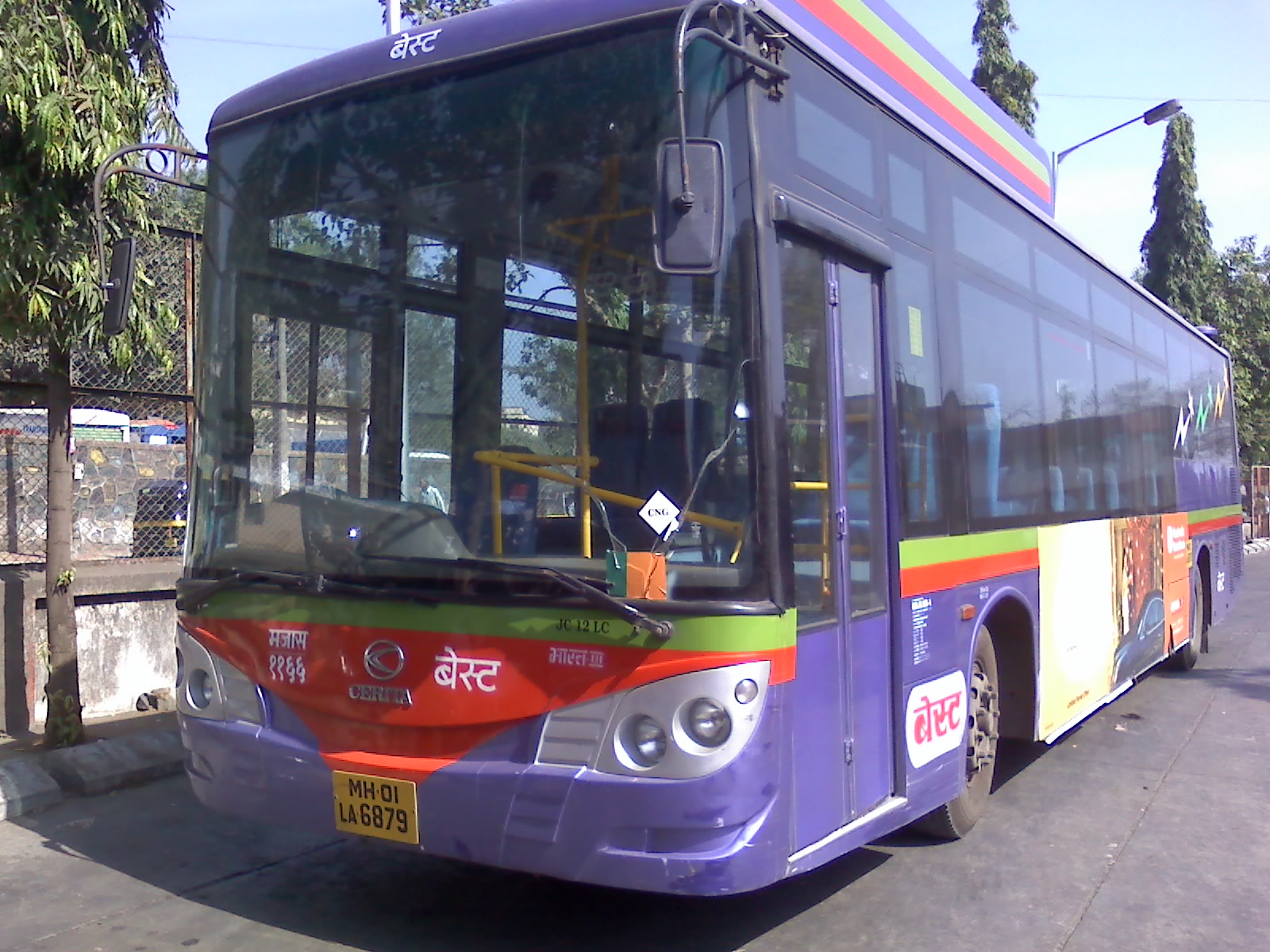
A BEST Bus in Mumbai

- Brihanmumbai Electric Supply and Transport (BEST) has a fleet of single and electric double decker buses. BEST runs their buses in Mumbai, Navi Mumbai, Thane, and Mira-Bhayandar
- Navi Mumbai Municipal Transport (NMMT) operates air-conditioned Volvo buses from Navi Mumbai to Bandra, Dadar, Mantralaya & Borivali and non-A/C buses from Navi Mumbai to Mulund, Kurla, Dadar, Andheri, Dindoshi & Mantralaya.
- Thane Municipal Transport (TMT) operates buses from Thane to Navi Mumbai, Borivali, Mira-Bhayandar and BKC.
- Kalyan-Dombivli Municipal Transport (KDMT) operate buses from Kalyan-Dombivli to Navi Mumbai, Panvel and Ulhasnagar.
- Mira-Bhayandar Municipal Transport (MBMT) operates buses from Mira-Bhayandar to Vasai-Virar, Thane and Borivali.
- Vasai-Virar Municipal Transport (VVMT) operate buses from Vasai-Virar to Thane, Mira-Bhayandar.

== BEST Bus Routes ==
Note:

- Red is denoted as AC route
- Yellow is denoted as LTD or Limited bus route (route which will only stop on limited bus stops)
- Green is denoted as C bus route (Express bus route which will stop on major bus stops)
- No color denoted on a route refers to a normal bus route (stops on all bus stops)
- Indicates that the bus is a Chalo BEST shuttle express bus

Route number	Origin	Destination	Via	Depot
A-1	Chhatrapati Shivaji Maharaj Terminus	Santacruz Depot	Mahatma Phule Market, Dr. M. Iqbal Chowk (J.J Hospital), Byculla Station (E), Jijamata Udyan, Sant Jagnade Chowk (Lalbaug), Hindmata Cinema (Parel), Khodadad Circle (Dadar TT), Plaza (Dadar West), Citylight Cinema, Mahim, Bandra West, S.V. Road, Khar West, Santacruz West	Santacruz
A-3	Navy Nagar (Colaba)	Jijamata Udyan	Afghan Church, Colaba Bus Station, Electric House, Dr. Shyamaprasad Mukherjee Chowk (Museum), S.D. Saraswati Chowk (Fort), CSMT, Mahatma Phule Market, Dr. M. Iqbal Chowk (J.J Hospital), Nagpada, Maharana Pratap Chowk (Mazgaon), Anjirwadi, Byculla Station (E)	Backbay
A-4	Dr. M. Iqbal Chowk (J.J. Hospital)	Oshiwara Depot	Byculla Station (E), Jijamata Udyan, Sant Jagnade Chowk (Lalbaug), Hindmata Cinema (Parel), Khodadad Circle (Dadar TT), Plaza (Dadar West), Citylight Cinema, Mahim, Bandra West, S.V. Road, Khar West, Santacruz West, Santacruz Depot, Vileparle West, Irla, Andheri Station (W), Amboli Naka, Jogeshwari (W) Bus Station, Ram Mandir, BEST Nagar	Oshiwara
A-5	Mantralaya	Kurla Bus Station (E)	Hutatma Chowk, V.B. Phadke Chowk, Kalbadevi, Vijay Vallabh Chowk (Pydhonie), Dr. M. Iqbal Chowk (J.J Hospital), Byculla Station (E), Jijamata Udyan, Sant Jagnade Chowk (Lalbaug), Hindmata Cinema (Parel), Khodadad Circle (Dadar TT), Matunga East, Maheshwari Udyan (Kings Circle), Rani Laxmibai Chowk (Sion), Chunabhatti, Nehru Nagar S.T. Depot, Nehru Nagar (Kurla East)	Anik
6LTD	Colaba Depot (Electric House)	Tata Power Centre (Mahul)	Dr. Shyamaprasad Mukherjee Chowk (Museum), Hutatma Chowk, CSMT, Mahatma Phule Market, Dr. M. Iqbal Chowk (J.J Hospital), Byculla Station (E), Jijamata Udyan, Sant Jagnade Chowk (Lalbaug), Hindmata Cinema (Parel), Khodadad Circle (Dadar TT), Five Gardens, Wadala West, BPT Colony, Barkat Ali Dargah, Bhakti Park, Wadala Truck Terminal, Anik Depot, Priyadarshini, Umarshi Bappa Chowk, Chembur Colony, Vashi Naka, BPCL Trombay, Gawangaon Refineries	Colaba
A-7	Vijay Vallabh Chowk (Pydhonie)	Vikhroli Depot	Dr. M. Iqbal Chowk (J.J Hospital), Byculla Station (E), Jijamata Udyan, Sant Jagnade Chowk (Lalbaug), Hindmata Cinema (Parel), Khodadad Circle (Dadar TT), Matunga East, Maheshwari Udyan (Kings Circle), Dharavi, Dharavi Depot, Kurla Post Office, Kurla Depot, Kurla West, Kamani, Ghatkopar West, Shreyas Cinema, Vikhroli Dargah	Vikhroli
A-8	Mantralaya	Shivaji Nagar Terminus	Hutatma Chowk, CSMT, Mahatma Phule Market, Dr. M. Iqbal Chowk (J.J Hospital), Byculla Station (E), Jijamata Udyan, Sant Jagnade Chowk (Lalbaug), Hindmata Cinema (Parel), Khodadad Circle (Dadar TT), Matunga East, Maheshwari Udyan (Kings Circle), Rani Laxmibai Chowk (Sion), Everard Nagar, Priyadarshini, Umarshi Bappa Chowk, Diamond Garden (Chembur), Chembur Station, Samrat Ashok Nagar (Deonar), Govandi	Shivaji Nagar
9	Colaba Bus Station	Antop Hill	Electric House, Dr. Shyamaprasad Mukherjee Chowk (Museum), Hutatma Chowk, CSMT, Mahatma Phule Market, V.B. Phadke Chowk, Kalbadevi, Vijay Vallabh Chowk (Pydhonie), Dr. M. Iqbal Chowk (J.J Hospital), Byculla Station (E), Jijamata Udyan, Sant Jagnade Chowk (Lalbaug), Mahatma Gandhi Hospital (Parel), KEM Hospital, Naigaon, Sahakar Nagar, Wadala Road Station (W), Matunga East, Maheshwari Udyan (Kings Circle), GTB Nagar Station, Sardar Nagar 4	Pratiksha Nagar
A-10	Colaba Depot (Electric House)	Pratiksha Nagar Depot	Dr. Shyamaprasad Mukherjee Chowk (Museum), Hutatma Chowk, CSMT, Mahatma Phule Market, V.B. Phadke Chowk, Kalbadevi, Vijay Vallabh Chowk (Pydhonie), Dr. M. Iqbal Chowk (J.J Hospital), Maharana Pratap Chowk (Mazgaon), Dockyard Road Station, Reay Road Station, Ghodapdeo, Shravan Yashwante Chowk (Kalachowki), Sewri, Wadala Road Station (W), BPT Colony, Barkat Ali Dargah, Bhakti Park, Wadala Truck Terminal	Anik
11LTD	Navy Nagar (Colaba)	Bandra Colony Bus Station	Afghan Church, Colaba Bus Station, Electric House, Dr. Shyamaprasad Mukherjee Chowk (Museum), S.D. Saraswati Chowk (Fort), CSMT, Mahatma Phule Market, Dr. M. Iqbal Chowk (J.J Hospital), Byculla Station (E), Jijamata Udyan, Sant Jagnade Chowk (Lalbaug), Hindmata Cinema (Parel), Khodadad Circle (Dadar TT), Matunga East, Maheshwari Udyan (Kings Circle), Dharavi, Kalanagar (Bandra East)	Dharavi
C-12	Santacruz Depot	Dahisar Bus Station	Vileparle West, Mithibai College, JVPD Bus Station, D.N. Nagar (Andheri West), Monginis Company, Jogeshwari West, Goregaon/Oshiwara Depot, Bangur Nagar (Goregaon West), Malad Depot, Mith Chowky (Malad West), Kandivali West, Mahavir Nagar (Extension), Shimpoli, Borivali West, Rushi Complex (Dahisar West), Dahisar Bridge, Dahisar Checknaka	Santacruz
13	Wadala Road Station (W)	Mahatma Gandhi Hospital (Parel)	Wadala West, Kidwai Nagar, Bhoiwada, KEM Hospital	Wadala
14	Dr. Shyamaprasad Mukherjee Chowk (Museum)	Pratiksha Nagar Depot	Hutatma Chowk, CSMT, V.B. Phadke Chowk, Kalbadevi, Vijay Vallabh Chowk (Pydhonie), Dr. M. Iqbal Chowk (J.J Hospital), Byculla Station (W), Com. Gulabrao Ganacharya Chowk (Chinchpokli West), Currey Road, Mahatma Gandhi Hospital (Parel), KEM Hospital, Bhoiwada, Wadala Road Station (W), Acharya Atre Nagar, Antop Hill, Sardar Nagar 4	Pratiksha Nagar
15	Mantralaya	Pratiksha Nagar Depot	Hutatma Chowk, V.B. Phadke Chowk, Kalbadevi, Vijay Vallabh Chowk (Pydhonie), Dr. M. Iqbal Chowk (J.J Hospital), Byculla Station (E), Jijamata Udyan, Sant Jagnade Chowk (Lalbaug), Hindmata Cinema (Parel), Khodadad Circle (Dadar TT), Five Gardens, Wadala West, Acharya Atre Nagar, Antop Hill, Sardar Nagar 4	Pratiksha Nagar
A-19	Mantralaya	Shivaji Nagar Depot	Dr. Shyamaprasad Mukherjee Chowk (Museum), Hutatma Chowk, CSMT, Dr. M. Iqbal Chowk (J.J Hospital), Byculla Station (E), Jijamata Udyan, Sant Jagnade Chowk (Lalbaug), Hindmata Cinema (Parel), Khodadad Circle (Dadar TT), Matunga East, Maheshwari Udyan (Kings Circle), Rani Laxmibai Chowk (Sion), Everard Nagar, Priyadarshini, Umarshi Bappa Chowk, Diamond Garden (Chembur), Chembur Station, Samrat Ashok Nagar (Deonar), Shivaji Nagar Junction	Shivaji Nagar
A-21	Dr. Shyamaprasad Mukherjee Chowk (Museum)	Trombay	CSMT, Mahatma Phule Market, Dr. M. Iqbal Chowk (J.J Hospital), Byculla Station (E), Jijamata Udyan, Sant Jagnade Chowk (Lalbaug), Hindmata Cinema (Parel), Khodadad Circle (Dadar TT), Matunga East, Maheshwari Udyan (Kings Circle), Rani Laxmibai Chowk (Sion), Everard Nagar, Priyadarshini, Umarshi Bappa Chowk, Chembur Colony, Deonar Depot, Anushakti Nagar, Mankhurd Station (S), Cheetah Camp	Deonar
A-22	Jijamata Udyan	Seepz Bus Station	Sant Jagnade Chowk (Lalbaug), Hindmata Cinema (Parel), Khodadad Circle (Dadar TT), Matunga East, Maheshwari Udyan (Kings Circle), Dharavi, Dharavi Depot, Kurla West, Kurla Depot, Kamani, Jari Mari, Saki Naka, Marol Naka, Marol Maroshi, Seepz	Majas
A-25	Backbay Depot	Kurla Depot	GD Somani School, Cuffe Parade, Hutatma Chowk, CSMT, Dr. M. Iqbal Chowk (J.J. Hospital), Byculla Station (E), Jijamata Udyan, Sant Jagnade Chowk (Lalbaug), Hindmata Cinema (Parel), Khodadad Circle (Dadar TT), Matunga East, Maheshwari Udyan (Kings Circle), Rani Laxmibai Chowk (Sion), Lions Park, Kurla West	Backbay
A-26	Colaba Depot (Electric House)	Shivaji Nagar Depot	Dr. Shyamaprasad Mukherjee Chowk (Museum), Hutatma Chowk, CSMT, Carnac Bunder, Wadi Bunder, Eastern Freeway (Mazgaon to BPT Colony), Shanti Nagar (Wadala East), BPCL (Mahul), Vashi Naka, Chembur Colony, Maitri Park, Deonar Depot, Anushakti Nagar, Mankhurd Station, Shivaji Nagar Junction	Shivaji Nagar
27	Rani Laxmibai Chowk (Sion)	Vaishali Nagar (Mulund)	Priyadarshini, Suman Nagar, Amar Mahal, Ghatkopar East, Ghatkopar Depot, Shreyas Cinema, Vikhroli Depot, Vikhroli West, Gandhi Nagar (Kanjurmarg West), Mangatram Petrol Pump, Bhandup West, Dr. KB Hedgewar Chowk, Mulund West, ESIS Hospital	Dharavi
28	Chhatrapati Shivaji Maharaj Terminus	J.V.P.D. Bus Station	VB Phadke Chowk, Marine Lines Station (E), Charni Road, Pandit Paluskar Chowk, Babulnath, Cumballa Hill, Jaslok Hospital, Vatsalabai Desai Chowk (Haji Ali), Nehru Planetarium (Worli), Acharya Atre Chowk (Worli), Prabhadevi, R.G. Gadkari Chowk (Dadar West), Citylight Cinema, Mahim, Bandra West, Linking Road (Khar West), Santacruz West, Juhu Koliwada, Juhu Beach	Santacruz
29LTD	Prabodhankar Thackeray Udyan (Sewri)	Vihar Lake	Parel Village, Tata Hospital, Bhoiwada, Naigaon, Khodadad Circle (Dadar TT), Matunga East, Maheshwari Udyan (Kings Circle), Dharavi, Dharavi Depot, Kurla West, Kurla Depot, Kamani, Jari Mari, Saki Naka, Chandivali Junction, Tunga Village, Powai Udyan, Morarji Nagar	Wadala
A-30	Pandit Paluskar Chowk (Charni Road)	Vikhroli Depot	Dr. Bhadkamkar Road, Mumbai Central, Nair Hospital, Saat Rasta (Mahalaxmi), Com. Gulabrao Ganacharya Chowk (Chinchpokli West), Sant Jagnade Chowk (Lalbaug), Hindmata Cinema (Parel), Khodadad Circle (Dadar TT), Matunga East, Maheshwari Udyan (Kings Circle), Rani Laxmibai Chowk (Sion), Everard Nagar, Priyadarshini, Suman Nagar, Amar Mahal, Ghatkopar East, Vikhroli East, Vikhroli Station (W)	Vikhroli
A-32	Vesave-Yari Road Bus Station	Goregaon Bus Station (W)	Versova Village, Seven Bungalows, Four Bungalows, DN Nagar (Andheri West), Monginis Company, Jogeshwari West, Goregaon/Oshiwara Depot, BEST Nagar (Goregaon West), Jawahar Nagar	Oshiwara
A-33	Worli Depot	Goregaon Bus Station (W)	Prabhadevi, R.G. Gadkari Chowk (Shivaji Park/Dadar West), Citylight Cinema, Mahim, Bandra West, S.V. Road, Khar West, Santacruz West, Santacruz Depot, Vileparle West, Irla, J.V.P.D Bus Station, DN Nagar (Andheri West), Monginis Company, Jogeshwari West, Goregaon/Oshiwara Depot, BEST Nagar (Goregaon West), Jawahar Nagar	Oshiwara
A-35	Comrade P.K. Kurne Chowk (Worli)	Seepz Bus Station	Prabhadevi, R.G. Gadkari Chowk (Shivaji Park/Dadar West), Citylight Cinema, Mahim, Kalanagar (Bandra East), Kherwadi, Vakola (Santacruz East), Vileparle East, Domestic Airport Junction, Hanuman Road, Vileparle Station (E), Parsiwada, Sahar, CSMIA Terminal 2, Marol Naka, Marol Maroshi, Vijay Nagar	Majas
A-37	J.Mehta Marg	Kurla Station (W)	Napean Sea Road, Mukesh Chowk (Kemps Corner), Breach Candy Hospital, Vatsalabai Desai Chowk (Haji Ali), Nehru Planetarium, Comrade P.K. Kurne Chowk (Worli), Prabhadevi, R.G. Gadkari Chowk (Shivaji Park/Dadar West), Citylight Cinema, Mahim, Kalanagar (Bandra East), Vakola (Santacruz East), Kalina, Vidyanagari, Kurla Depot	Kurla
A-39	Veer Hutatma Bhai Kotwal Udyan (Plaza)	Seepz Bus Station	R.G. Gadkari Chowk (Shivaji Park), Citylight Cinema, Mahim, Kalanagar (Bandra East), Kherwadi, Vakola (Santacruz East), Vileparle East, Domestic Airport Junction, Vileparle Station (E), Agarkar Chowk (Andheri East), Gundavali, Chakala, Marol Depot	Majas
C-40	Prabodhankar Thackeray Udyan (Sewri)	Dindoshi Bus Station	Sewri Naka, Parel Village, Hindmata Cinema (Parel), Khodadad Circle (Dadar TT), Plaza, R.G. Gadkari Chowk (Shivaji Park/Dadar West), Citylight Cinema, Mahim, Kalanagar (Bandra East), Kherwadi, Vakola (Santacruz East), Domestic Airport Junction, Vileparle East, Gundavali (Andheri East), Jogeshwari East, Bimbisar Nagar, Vanrai (Goregaon East), Virwani Estate	Wadala
A-42	Ferry Wharf	Kamla Nehru Park	Dockyard Road Station, Maharana Pratap Chowk (Mazgaon), Noorbaug, Sandhurst Road Station, Bhuleshwar, Pandit Paluskar Chowk (Charni Road), Frere Bridge (Grant Road), Nana Chowk, Gamdevi, Girgaon Chowpatty, Walkeshwar	Mumbai Central
A-44	Colaba Depot (Electric House)	Worli Depot	Dr. Shyamaprasad Mukherjee Chowk (Museum), Swami Dayanand Saraswati Chowk (Fort), CSMT, Carnac Bunder, Wadi Bunder, Dockyard Road Station, Reay Road Station, Ghodapdeo, Shravan Yashwante Chowk (Kalachowki), Sant Jagnade Chowk (Lalbaug), Currey Road Station, Phoenix Palladium (Lower Parel), Acharya Atre Chowk (Worli), Comrade P.K. Kurne Chowk (Worli), Worli Village	Worli
A-45	Backbay Depot	Mahul Village	World Trade Centre, GD Somani School, Cuffe Parade, Hutatma Chowk, CSMT, Dr. M. Iqbal Chowk (J.J. Hospital), Noorbaug, Maharana Pratap Chowk (Mazgaon), Dockyard Road Station, Reay Road Station, Ghodapdeo, Shravan Yashwante Chowk (Kalachowki), Sewri Naka, Kidwai Nagar (Wadala West), Sharda Cinema, Khodadad Circle (Dadar TT), Five Gardens, Wadala Bridge, BPT Colony (Barkat Ali Dargah), Shanti Nagar (Wadala East), Bhakti Park Junction, MMRDA Colony (Mahul)	Backbay
46	Ferry Wharf	Kalakilla Depot	Dockyard Road Station, Maharana Pratap Chowk (Mazgaon), Anjirwadi, Shravan Yashwante Chowk (Kalachowki), Sewri Naka, Kidwai Nagar (Wadala West), Sharda Cinema, Khodadad Circle (Dadar TT), Plaza, R.G. Gadkari Chowk (Shivaji Park/Dadar West), Citylight Cinema, Mahim, Mahim Station (W), Macchimar Nagar, Dharavi Koliwada	Kalakilla
A-49	Mumbai Central Depot	Mahul Village	A.H. Ansari Chowk (Nagpada), Nesbit Road, Maharana Pratap Chowk (Mazgaon), Dockyard Road Station, Reay Road Station, Ghodapdeo, Shravan Yashwante Chowk (Kalachowki), Sewri Station (W), Kidwai Nagar (Wadala West), Wadala Road Station (W), Wadala Bridge, BPT Colony (Barkat Ali Dargah), Shanti Nagar (Wadala East), Bhakti Park Junction, MMRDA Colony (Mahul)	Mumbai Central
50	Ferry Wharf	Worli Depot	Dockyard Road Station, Maharana Pratap Chowk (Mazgaon), Nesbit Road, Nagpada, Byculla Station (E), Jijamata Udyan, Ghodapdeo, Shravan Yashwante Chowk (Kalachowki), Shantaram Pujare Chowk, Sant Jagnade Chowk (Lalbaug), Currey Road Station, Lower Parel Station, Gopikrishna Piramal Hospital (Lower Parel), Phoenix Palladium, Acharya Atre Chowk (Worli), Comrade P.K. Kurne Chowk (Worli), Worli Village	Worli
51	Colaba Bus Station	Santacruz Depot	Electric House, Dr. Shyamaprasad Mukherjee Chowk (Museum), Hutatma Chowk, CSMT, Mahatma Phule Market, Dr. M. Iqbal Chowk (J.J. Hospital), Byculla Station (E), Jijamata Udyan, Sant Jagnade Chowk (Lalbaug), Hindmata Cinema (Parel), Khodadad Circle (Dadar TT), Plaza (Dadar West), Citylight Cinema, Mahim, Bandra West, Pali Hill Naka, Carter Road, Shirley, Khar Danda, Khar West, S.V. Road, Santacruz West	Santacruz
52	Shravan Yashwante Chowk (Kalachowki)	Kalakilla Depot	Abhyudaya Nagar (Kalachowki), Mint Colony, Bharatmata Cinema, Currey Road Station, Lower Parel Station, Parel S.T. Depot/Sant Rohidas Chowk, Kabutarkhana (Dadar West), Plaza, R.G. Gadkari Chowk, Citylight Cinema, Mahim Station (W), Macchimar Nagar, Dharavi Koliwada	Kalakilla
A-C-53	Ghatkopar Depot	Kalamboli	Ramabai Nagar (Ghatkopar East), Chheda Nagar, Shivaji Nagar Junction, Mankhurd/Maharashtra Nagar, Vashi Village, Vashi Bus Station, St. Lawrence High School, Vashi APMC, Turbhe, Juinagar Station (E), Shiravane Gaon, Nerul Naka, Uran Phata, CBD Belapur/Kokan Bhavan, Belpada, Kopra Gaon (Kharghar), Taloja Phata, Kamothe, Kalamboli Gaon	Ghatkopar
C-54	Wadala Depot	Airoli Bus Station	Khodadad Circle (Dadar TT), Plaza, R.G. Gadkari Chowk (Dadar West), Citylight Cinema, Mahim, Kalanagar (Bandra East), Income Tax Office (BKC), MMRDA Grounds, Bank of Baroda (BKC), Chunabhatti Bridge, Everard Nagar, Priyadarshini, Suman Nagar, Amar Mahal, Ghatkopar East, Ghatkopar Depot, Vikhroli East, Kannamwar Nagar, Kanjur Gaon, Bhandup East, Mulund-Airoli Bridge, Airoli Sector 10, Diva Gaon, Sector 5	Wadala
A-56	Worli Depot	Vesave-Yari Road Bus Station	Worli Village, Prabhadevi, Kabutarkhana (Dadar West), Plaza, R.G. Gadkari Chowk, Citylight Cinema, Mahim, Bandra West, Pali Hill Naka, Carter Road, Shirley, Khar Danda, Khar West, Linking Road, Santacruz West, Juhu Koliwada, SNDT College (Juhu), Juhu Beach, Juhu, JVPD Bus Station, Versova Link Road, Four Bungalows, Seven Bungalows	Oshiwara
57	Prabodhankar Thackeray Udyan (Sewri)	Walkeshwar	Sewri Naka, Parel Village, KEM Hospital, Mahatma Gandhi Hospital, Bharatmata Cinema, Currey Road Station, Lower Parel Station, Ganpatrao Kadam Marg/Gopikrishna Piramal Hospital, Phoenix Palladium, Acharya Atre Chowk, Nehru Planetarium, Vatsalabai Desai Chowk (Haji Ali), Jaslok Hospital, Cumballa Hill, Babulnath, Shitalbaug (Walkeshwar)	Wadala
A-58	Kurla Bus Station (E)	Wadala Truck Terminal	Nehru Nagar, Thakkar Bappa Colony, Suman Nagar, Priyadarshini, Anik Depot	Anik
A-59	Kurla Bus Station (E)	Veer Hutatma Bhai Kotwal Udyan (Plaza)	Nehru Nagar, Thakkar Bappa Colony, Suman Nagar, Priyadarshini, Anik Depot, Wadala Truck Terminal, Bhakti Park, Shanti Nagar (Wadala East), Barkat Ali Dargah, BPT Colony, Wadala West, Five Gardens, Matunga East, Khodadad Circle (Dadar TT)	Anik
60	Kurla Bus Station (E)	Maharana Pratap Chowk (Mazgaon)	Nehru Nagar, Thakkar Bappa Colony, Suman Nagar, Priyadarshini, Anik Depot, Wadala Truck Terminal, Bhakti Park, Shanti Nagar (Wadala East), Barkat Ali Dargah, BPT Colony (Wadala East), Sewri Station (E), Coal Bunder, LBS Collegem Tata Oil Mill (Reay Road), Reay Road Station, Anjirwadi	Anik
C-61	Mulund Depot	Mira Road Station (E)	Mulund Station (W), Maharana Pratap Chowk (Mulund West), Marathon Chowk (Thane Flyover), Nitin Company, Cadbury Junction, Majiwada, Kapurbawdi, Manpada, Brahmand, Patlipada, Waghbil, Kasarvadavali, Owala, Bhayandarpada, Gaimukh, Kajupada, Ghodbunder Road, Versova Gaon, Ghodbunder Gaon, Kashimira, Mira Road East	Mulund
A-62	Vasantrao Naik Chowk (Tardeo)	Vidyavihar Bus Station (W)	Vatsalabai Desai Chowk (Haji Ali), Nehru Planetarium, Acharya Atre Chowk (Worli), Worli, Babasaheb Worlikar Chowk, Prabhadevi, Prabhodhankar Thackeray Chowk, R.G. Gadkari Chowk (Dadar West), Citylight Cinema, Mahim, Kalanagar (Bandra East), Income Tax Office, ICICI Bank (BKC), BKC Telephone Exchange, Kurla Depot, Kurla West, Kamani, Navpada (Vidyavihar West)	Kurla
A-63	Chunabhatti Bus Station	Vasantrao Naik Chowk (Tardeo)	Rani Laxmibai Chowk (Sion), Maheshwari Udyan (Kings Circle), R.A. Kidwai Marg, Wadala Road Station (W), Wadala West, Wadala Depot, Khodadad Circle (Dadar TT), Plaza (Dadar West), Prabodhankar Thackeray Chowk, Parel ST Depot/Sant Rohidas Chowk, Lower Parel Railway Workshop, Lower Parel Station, Com. Gulabrao Ganacharya Chowk (Chinchpokli West), Byculla Station (W), Alexandra Cinema, Mumbai Central Depot	Mumbai Central
64	Dadar Station (E)	New Hindmill/MHADA Colony (Byculla East)	Khodadad Circle (Dadar TT), Spring Mill, Naigaon, Bhoiwada, Parel Village, Mint Colony, Shravan Yashwante Chowk (Kalachowki)	Wadala
66	Rani Laxmibai Chowk (Sion)	Ballard Pier	Maheshwari Udyan (Kings Circle), Matunga East, Khodadad Circle (Dadar TT), Hindmata Cinema (Parel East), Sant Jagnade Chowk (Lalbaug), Com. Gulabrao Ganacharya Chowk (Chinchpokli), Sant Gadge Maharaj Chowk (Mahalaxmi), Nair Hospital, Mumbai Central, Navjeevan Society (Tardeo), Pandit Paluskar Chowk (Charni Road), SK Patil Garden, Marine Lines Station (E), Vasudev Balwant Phadke Chowk, CSMT, Swami Dayanand Saraswati Chowk (Fort)	Kalakilla
67	Antop Hill	Kamla Nehru Park	Sardar Nagar 4, GTB Nagar Station, Maheshwari Udyan (Kings Circle), Wadala Church, BEST Workshop, Khodadad Circle (Dadar TT), Sharda Cinema, Naigaon, Tata Hospital (Bhoiwada), KEM Hospital, MG Hospital, Sant Jagnade Chowk (Lalbaug), Shravan Yashwante Chowk (Kalachowki), Jijamata Udyan, Byculla Station (E), AH Ansari Chowk (Nagpada), Alexandra Cinema, Mumbai Central Depot, Vasantrao Naik Chowk (Tardeo), Nana Chowk (Grant Road), Gamdevi, Girgaon Chowpatty, Shitalbaug, Walkeshwar	Pratiksha Nagar
69	Dr. Shyamaprasad Mukherjee Chowk (Museum)	Prabodhankar Thackeray Udyan (Sewri)	Hutatma Chowk, CSMT, VB Phadke Chowk, Thakurdwar, Girgaon, Charni Road, Rushi Mehta Chowk (Tardeo), Alexandra Cinema, AH Ansari Chowk (Nagpada), Byculla Station (E), Jijamata Udyan, Sant Jagnade Chowk (Lalbaug), MG Hospital, KEM Hospital, Parel Village, Sewri Naka	Wadala
A-C-71	Dharavi Depot	Mira Road Station (E)	Dharavi Koliwada, Macchimar Nagar, Mahim, Kalanagar (Bandra East), Kherwadi, Vakola (Santacruz East), Vileparle East, Domestic Airport Junction, Gundavali (Andheri East), Jogeshwari East, Bimbisar Nagar, Vanrai (Goregaon East), Virwani Estate, Kurar Village, Pushpa Park (Kandivali East), Dattani Park, Magathane Depot, National Park (Borivali East), Ghartanpada, Dahisar Checknaka, Kashimira, Silver Park	Kalakilla
A-C-72	Rani Laxmibai Chowk (Sion)	Bhayander Station (E)	Dharavi Depot, Dharavi T Junction, Kalanagar (Bandra East), Kherwadi, Vakola (Santacruz East), Vileparle East, Domestic Airport Junction, Gundavali (Andheri East), Jogeshwari East, Bimbisar Nagar, Vanrai (Goregaon East), Virwani Estate, Kurar Village, Pushpa Park (Kandivali East), Dattani Park, Magathane Depot, National Park (Borivali East), Ghartanpada, Dahisar Checknaka, Kashimira, Golden Nest, Navghar Naka	Kalakilla
75	Chunabhatti	Bhakti Park	Rani Laxmibai Chowk (Sion), GTB Nagar Station, Ravli Camp, Wadala Truck Terminal, Miraj Cinema (Anik)	Pratiksha Nagar
A-76	Byculla Station (W)	Byculla Station (W)	Sunder Galli, Sant Gadge Maharaj Chowk (Saat Rasta), Mahalaxmi Station (W), Vatsalabai Desai Chowk (Haji Ali), Jaslok Hospital, Cumballa Hill, Peddar Road, Mukesh Chowk, Breach Candy Hospital, Vatsalabai Desai Chowk (Haji Ali), Mahalaxmi Station (W), Sant Gadge Maharaj Chowk (Saat Rasta)	Mumbai Central
A-77	Byculla Station (W)	Byculla Station (W)	Sant Gadge Maharaj Chowk (Saat Rasta), Mahalaxmi Station (W), Vatsalabai Desai Chowk (Haji Ali), Breach Candy Hospital, Mukesh Chowk, Peddar Road, Cumballa Hill, Jaslok Hospital, Vatsalabai Desai Chowk (Haji Ali), Mahalaxmi Station (W), Sant Gadge Maharaj Chowk (Saat Rasta), Sunder Galli	Mumbai Central
A-78	Dr. Shyamaprasad Mukherjee Chowk (Museum)	Byculla Station (W)	Hutatma Chowk, Ahilyabai Holkar Chowk (Churchgate), Marine Drive, Coastal Road (till Breach Candy), Breach Candy Hospital, Vatsalabai Desai Chowk (Haji Ali), Mahalaxmi Station (W), Sant Gadge Maharaj Chowk (Saat Rasta)	Mumbai Central
79	Santacruz Depot	Prabodhankar Thackeray Nagar Bus Station (Charkop)		Santacruz
A-82	Mantralaya	Worli Depot	TML (Tata Marcopolo EV)	Worli
83	Colaba Bus Station	Santacruz Depot	MUT (Tata Marcopolo CNG)	Santacruz
A-84	Dr. Shyamaprasad Mukherjee Chowk (Museum)	Oshiwara Depot	PMI Urban 12M Electric Bus	Oshiwara
A-85	Pandit Paluskar Chowk (Charni Road)	Kurla Bus Station (E)	DAGA (Tata Marcopolo CNG Midi)	Anik
C-86	Backbay Depot	Bandra Bus Station (W)	ACGL built Tata LPO 1618	Bandra
87LTD	Mantralaya	Bandra Colony	MUT (Tata Marcopolo CNG)	Dharavi
88	Mantralaya	Pratiksha Nagar Depot	MUT (Tata Marcopolo CNG)	Pratiksha Nagar
A-89	Mantralaya	Worli Depot	TML (Tata Marcopolo EV)	Worli
A-92	Vasantrao Naik Chowk (Tardeo)	Anushakti Nagar (Deonar)	DAGA (Tata Marcopolo CNG Midi)	Deonar
100	Ahilyabai Holkar Chowk (Churchgate)	Free Press Journal Marg	Olectra K7 Non-AC Electric Bus	Backbay
A-101	World Trade Centre	Mahatma Phule Market	TML (Tata Marcopolo EV)	Backbay
A-102	Grant Road Station (E)	Vijay Vallabh Chowk (Pydhonie)	Olectra X2 Electric Bus	Mumbai Central
A-103	R.C. Church	Kamla Nehru Park	TML (Tata Marcopolo EV)	Backbay
A-104	Grant Road Station (W)	J.Mehta Marg	DAGA (Tata Marcopolo CNG Midi)	Mumbai Central
A-105	Vijay Vallabh Chowk (Pydhonie)	Kamla Nehru Park	DAGA (Tata Marcopolo CNG Midi)	Mumbai Central
A-106	Navy Nagar (Colaba)	Kamla Nehru Park	TML (Tata Marcopolo EV)	Backbay
A-108	Chhatrapati Shivaji Maharaj Terminus	Kamla Nehru Park	Olectra X2 Electric Bus	Mumbai Central
110	Comrade P.K. Kurne Chowk (Worli)	Sangam Nagar (Wadala)	ACGL built Tata LPO 1618	Worli
A-111	Chhatrapati Shivaji Maharaj Terminus	Free Press Journal Marg	TML (Tata Marcopolo EV)	Backbay
A-112	Ahilyabai Holkar Chowk (Churchgate)	Gateway of India	TML (Tata Marcopolo EV)	Backbay
A-113	Ahilyabai Holkar Chowk (Churchgate)	Mahatma Phule Market	TML (Tata Marcopolo EV)	Backbay
A-115	Chhatrapati Shivaji Maharaj Terminus	N.C.P.A. (Nariman Point)	Switch DD Electric Bus	Colaba
A-116	Chhatrapati Shivaji Maharaj Terminus	Gateway of India	TML (Tata Marcopolo EV)	Backbay
117	Wadala Road Station (W)	Sangam Nagar (Wadala East)	MUT (Ashok Leyland CNG)	Wadala
A-118	Dadar Station (W)	Worli Village	TML (Tata Marcopolo EV)	Worli
A-119	Kasturba Gandhi Chowk (Kalbadevi)	Pandit Paluskar Chowk (Charni Road)	DAGA (Tata Marcopolo CNG)	Mumbai Central
A-121	Backbay Depot	J.Mehta Marg	TML (Tata Marcopolo EV)	Backbay
A-122	Ballard Pier	J.Mehta Marg	Olectra X2 Electric Bus	Mumbai Central
A-123	R.C. Church	Vasantrao Naik Chowk (Tardeo)	Olectra X2 Electric Bus	Mumbai Central
A-124	Colaba Bus Station	Worli Depot	TML (Tata Marcopolo EV)	Worli
A-125	Navy Nagar (Colaba)	Worli Depot	TML (Tata Marcopolo EV)	Worli
A-126	Mantralaya	Jijamata Udyan	Olectra X2 Electric Bus	Mumbai Central
132	Colaba Bus Station	Mumbai Central Depot	ACGL built Tata LPO 1618	Mumbai Central
A-134	Backbay Depot	Prabodhankar Thackeray Udyan (Sewri)	TML (Tata Marcopolo EV)	Backbay
A-135	Ferry Wharf	J.Mehta Marg	Olectra X2 Electric Bus	Mumbai Central
A-136	Backbay Depot	Ahilyabai Holkar Chowk (Churchgate)	TML (Tata Marcopolo EV)	Backbay
A-137	Navy Nagar (Colaba)	Ahilyabai Holkar Chowk (Churchgate)	TML (Tata Marcopolo EV)	Backbay
A-138	Backbay Depot	Chhatrapati Shivaji Maharaj Terminus	Switch DD Electric Bus	Colaba
139	Chhatrapati Shivaji Maharaj Terminus	Geeta Nagar	Tejaswini Eicher Midi Bus	Colaba
151	Wadala Depot	J.Mehta Marg	MUT (Ashok Leyland CNG)	Wadala
A-153	Byculla Station (W)	Nair Hospital	DAGA (Tata Marcopolo CNG Midi)	Mumbai Central
A-154	Byculla Station (W)	Nehru Planetarium	DAGA (Tata Marcopolo CNG Midi)	Mumbai Central
A-155	Grant Road Station (W)	Jaslok Hospital	DAGA (Tata Marcopolo CNG Midi)	Mumbai Central
A-162	Worli Village	Prabodhankar Thackeray Udyan (Sewri)	TML (Tata Marcopolo EV)	Worli
164	Maharana Pratap Chowk (Mazgaon)	Kalakilla Depot	Olectra K7 Electric Bus	Kalakilla
165	Wadala Depot	Kasturba Gandhi Chowk (C.P. Tank)	MUT (Ashok Leyland CNG)	Wadala
A-167	Prabhadevi Station (W)	Comrade P.K. Kurne Chowk (Worli)	TML (Tata Marcopolo EV)	Worli
168	Wadala Depot	Sant Rohidas Chowk (Parel S.T. Depot)	MUT (Ashok Leyland CNG)	Wadala
169	Pratiksha Nagar Depot	Worli Depot	MUT (Tata Marcopolo CNG)	Pratiksha Nagar
A-171	Worli Depot	Antop Hill	TML (Tata Marcopolo EV)	Worli
172	Pratiksha Nagar Depot	Comrade P.K. Kurne Chowk (Worli)	MUT (Tata Marcopolo CNG)	Pratiksha Nagar
A/174	Veer Hutatma Bhai Kotwal Udyan (Plaza)	Bharani Naka (Antop Hill)	DAGA (Tata Marcopolo CNG Midi) & Tejaswini Eicher Midi Bus	Anik & Wadala
A-175	Pratiksha Nagar Depot	Prabodhankar Thackeray Chowk (Dadar West)	DAGA (Tata Marcopolo CNG Midi)	Anik
177	Shravan Yashwante Chowk (Kalachowki)	Hindmata Cinema (Parel)	Tejaswini Eicher Midi Bus	Wadala
A-180	Malvani Depot	Chhatrapati Shivaji Maharaj International Airport	TML (Tata Marcopolo EV)	Malvani
181	Seepz Bus Station	Antop Hill	MUT (Ashok Leyland CNG)	Pratiksha Nagar
A-185	Agarkar Chowk (Andheri East)	Kannamwar Nagar-2 (Vikhroli East)	Olectra X2 Electric Bus	Ghatkopar
186	Agarkar Chowk (Andheri East)	Vihar Lake	MUT (Tata Marcopolo CNG)	Majas
A-200	Vesave-Yari Road Bus Station	Shravan Yashwante Chowk (Kalachowki)	PMI Urban Electric Bus	Oshiwara
201	Santacruz Depot	Parel ST Depot	MUT (Tata Marcopolo CNG)	Santacruz
A-202	Gorai Depot	Mahim Bus Station	Olectra X2 Electric Bus	Gorai
A-203	Juhu Beach	Dahisar Bridge	Olectra X2 Electric Bus	Gorai
A-204	Goregaon (W) Bus Station	Gomant Nagar (Dahisar West)	PMI Urban Electric Bus	Oshiwara
A-205	Jogeshwari (W) Bus Station	Gomant Nagar (Dahisar West)	PMI Urban Electric Bus	Oshiwara
A-206	Prabodhankar Thackeray Nagar (Charkop) Bus Station	I.C. Colony	Midi Electric Hybrid	Gorai
A-207	Malvani Depot	Dahisar Bus Station	TML (Tata Marcopolo EV Bus)	Malvani
A-208	Borivali Station (W)	Saraswati Complex (Dahisar)	DAGA (Tata Marcopolo CNG Midi)	Gorai
A-209	Samta Nagar (Kandivali)	Ashish Complex	DAGA (Tata Marcopolo CNG Midi)	Magathane
210LTD	Vesave-Yari Road Bus Station	Dahisar Bridge	ACGL built Tata LPO 1618	Poisar
A-211	Bandra Bus Station (W)	Father Agnel Ashram (Bandstand)	Olectra X2 Electric Bus	Santacruz
212	Prabodhankar Thackeray Udyan (Sewri)	Bandra Reclamation Bus Station	MUT (Ashok Leyland CNG)	Wadala
214	Bandra Bus Station (W)	Mount Mary Steps (Bandra West)	Tejaswini Eicher Midi Bus	Santacruz
A-215	Bandra Reclamation Bus Station	Tata Colony (Bandra East)	DAGA (Tata Marcopolo CNG Midi)	Anik
216	Dadar Station (E)	MHADA Colony (Naigaon)	Tejaswini Eicher Midi Bus	Wadala
217	Dadar Station (E)	Mint Colony	MUT (Ashok Leyland CNG)	Wadala
218	Dadar Station (E)	Prabodhankar Thackeray Udyan (Sewri)	MUT (Ashok Leyland CNG)	Wadala
A-219	Bandra Bus Station (W)	Bandra Reclamation Bus Station	Olectra X2 Electric Bus	Santacruz
A-220	Bandra Station (W)	Khar Road Station (W)	Olectra X2 Electric Bus	Santacruz
A-221	Andheri Station (W)	Vesave-Yari Road Bus Station	PMI Urban Electric Bus	Oshiwara
222	Bandra Station (W)	Chuim Village	ACGL built Tata LPO 1618	Bandra
A-223	Seven Bungalows Bus Station	Samta Nagar (Kandivali East)	PMI Urban Electric Bus	Oshiwara
224	Santacruz Depot	Borivali Station (W)	MUT (Tata Marcopolo CNG)	Santacruz
225	Bandra Bus Station (W)	Dindoshi Bus Station	ACGL built Tata LPO 1618	Bandra
A-226	Prabodhankar Thackeray Nagar (Charkop) Bus Station	Barve Nagar (Ghatkopar)	Olectra X2 Electric Bus	Gorai
231	Santacruz Station (W)	Juhu Bus Station	MUT (Tata Marcopolo CNG)	Santacruz
A-234	Jogeshwari Bus Station (W)	Vesave-Yari Road Bus Station	PMI Urban Electric Bus	Oshiwara
A-235	Andheri Station (W)	Millat Nagar	PMI Urban Electric Bus	Oshiwara
239	Kandivali Station (W)	Charkop Sector 9	ACGL built Tata LPO 1618	Poisar
A-240	Kanderpada Bus Station	Shanti Ashram	DAGA (Tata Marcopolo CNG Midi)	Gorai
A-241	Malvani Depot	Santacruz Depot	TML (Tata Marcopolo EV)	Malvani
A-242	Andheri Station (W)	Millat Nagar	PMI Urban Electric Bus	Oshiwara
A-243	Malad Station (W)	Jankalyan Nagar	DAGA (Tata Marcopolo CNG Midi)	Gorai
A-244	Borivali Station (W)	Kandivali Station (W)	DAGA (Tata Marcopolo CNG Midi)	Gorai
A-245	Prabodhankar Thackeray Nagar (Charkop) Bus Station	Kanderpada Bus Station	Olectra X2 Electric Bus	Gorai
A-246	Borivali Station (W)	Kandivali Station (W)	Olectra X2 Electric Bus	Gorai
A-247	Borivali Station (W)	Gorai Creek	DAGA (Tata Marcopolo CNG Midi)	Gorai
A-248	Andheri Station (W)	Ramesh Nagar (Andheri)	DAGA (Tata Marcopolo CNG Midi)	Gorai
A-249	Andheri Station (W)	Vesave-Yari Road Bus Station	PMI Urban Electric Bus	Oshiwara
A-251	Andheri Station (W)	Vesave-Yari Road Bus Station	PMI Urban Electric Bus	Oshiwara
252	Andheri Station (W)	Sardar Patel Nagar (Park Street)	MUT (Tata Marcopolo CNG)	Santacruz
A-254	Andheri Station (W)	Veera Desai Road (Extension)	DAGA (Tata Marcopolo CNG Midi)	Gorai
255LTD	Pratiksha Nagar Depot	J.V.P.D. Bus Station	MUT (Ashok Leyland CNG)	Pratiksha Nagar
A-256	Malvani Depot	Juhu Beach	TML (Tata Marcopolo EV)	Malvani
257	Andheri Station (W)	J.V.P.D. Bus Station	MUT (Tata Marcopolo CNG)	Santacruz
A-259	Andheri Station (W)	Gorai Depot	Olectra X2 Electric Bus	Gorai
261	Goregaon Bus Station (W)	Jogeshwari Bus Station (W)	ACGL built Tata LPO 1618	Oshiwara
262	Goregaon Bus Station (W)	Malad Depot	ACGL built Tata LPO 1618	Goregaon
263	Goregaon Bus Station (W)	Ayyappa Mandir (Goregaon)	ACGL built Tata LPO 1618	Oshiwara
A-264	Sadbhakti Mandir	Samarth Nagar (Jogeshwari)	DAGA (Tata Marcopolo CNG)	Magathane
A/266	Andheri Station (W)	Shree Swami Samarth Nagar (Extension)	MUT Tata CNG and PMI Electric Bus	Santacruz and Oshiwara
268	Andheri Station (W)	Shree Swami Samarth Nagar (Extension)	MUT (Tata Marcopolo CNG)	Santacruz
A-269	Gorai Depot	Madh Jetty	Olectra X2 Electric Bus	Gorai
270	Malad Station (W)	Mahapalika Pumping Centre (Malvani)	Tejaswini Eicher Midi Bus	Malad
271	Malad Station (W)	Madh Jetty	ACGL built Tata LPO 1618	Malad
A-272	Malad Station (W)	Marve Beach	PMI Urban Electric Bus	Poisar
A-273	Malad Station (W)	Malvani Depot	TML (Tata Marcopolo EV)	Malvani
A-274	Kandivali Station (W)	Bunder Pakhadi Village	DAGA (Tata Marcopolo CNG Midi)	Gorai
A-276	Kandivali Station (W)	Charkop Sector 8	PMI Urban Electric Bus	Poisar
A-277	Kandivali Station (W)	Borivali Station (W)	PMI Urban Electric Bus	Poisar
A-278	Kandivali Station (W)	Marina Enclave Complex (Malad)	PMI Urban Electric Bus	Poisar
279	Poisar Depot	Samta Nagar (Kandivali)	ACGL built Tata LPO 1618	Poisar
A-280	Kandivali Station (W)	Mahavir Nagar (Extension)	DAGA (Tata Marcopolo CNG Midi)	Gorai
A-281	Kandivali Station (W)	Pushpa Park (Malad)	DAGA (Tata Marcopolo CNG Midi)	Gorai
A-282	Kandivali Station (W)	Damu Nagar (Extension)	DAGA (Tata Marcopolo CNG Midi)	Gorai
A-286	Kandivali Station (W)	Charkop Village	DAGA (Tata Marcopolo CNG Midi)	Gorai
A-287	Kandivali Bus Station (E)	ESIS Hospital (Thakur Village)	DAGA (Tata Marcopolo CNG Midi)	Magathane
A-288	Kandivali Bus Station (E)	Kranti Nagar (Kandivali)	DAGA (Tata Marcopolo CNG Midi)	Magathane
A-289	Kandivali Bus Station (E)	Anita Nagar	DAGA (Tata Marcopolo CNG Midi)	Magathane
A-293	Jai Maharashtra Nagar (Borivali)	Shree Krishna Nagar	DAGA (Tata Marcopolo CNG Midi)	Gorai
A-294	Borivali Station (W)	Gorai Creek	DAGA (Tata Marcopolo CNG Midi)	Gorai
A-296	Link Road Junction (Kandivali)	Shanti Ashram	DAGA (Tata Marcopolo CNG Midi)	Gorai
A-297	Borivali Station (E)	Kokanipada (Extension)	DAGA (Tata Marcopolo CNG Midi)	Magathane
A-298	Borivali Station (E)	Rawalpada	Olectra X2 Electric Bus	Magathane
A-300	Kandivali Bus Station (E)	Sanskruti Apartments	DAGA (Tata Marcopolo CNG Midi)	Magathane
A-301	Borivali Station (E)	Hanuman Tekdi	DAGA (Tata Marcopolo CNG Midi)	Magathane
303	Bandra Bus Station (E)	Mulund Station (W)	MUT (Tata Marcopolo CNG)	Dharavi
C-305	Backbay Depot	Dharavi Depot	MUT (Tata Marcopolo CNG)	Dharavi
307	Majas Depot	Vaishali Nagar (Mulund)	MUT (Tata Marcopolo CNG)	Majas
308	Majas Depot	Vidyavihar Bus Station (W)	MUT (Tata Marcopolo CNG)	Majas
310	Kurla Station (W)	Bandra Terminus	MUT (Tata Marcopolo CNG)	Dharavi
A-310	Bandra Terminus	BKC Telephone Exchange	Switch DD Electric Bus	Kurla
A-311	Kurla Station (W)	Santacruz Station (E)	Olectra X2 Electric Bus	Kurla
A-312	Seepz Bus Station	Pratiksha Nagar Depot	DAGA (Tata Marcopolo CNG Midi)	Anik
A-313	Kurla Station (W)	Santacruz Station (E)	Olectra X2 Electric Bus	Kurla
A-314	Bandra Bus Station (E)	Uttar Bhartiya Sangha	Olectra X2 Electric Bus	Kurla
316	Bandra Terminus	Bandra Colony	MUT (Tata Marcopolo CNG)	Dharavi
317	Bandra Terminus	Tata Colony (Bandra East)	Tejaswini Eicher Midi Bus	Dharavi
A-318	Kurla Station (W)	Santacruz Station (E)	Olectra X2 Electric Bus	Kurla
319	Kurla Station (W)	Majas Depot	MUT (Tata Marcopolo CNG)	Majas
320	Kurla Station (W)	Filterpada	ACGL built Tata LPO 1618	Kurla
321LTD	Mahim Bus Station	Barve Nagar (Ghatkopar)	ACGL built Tata LPO 1618	Bandra
A-322	Vidyavihar Bus Station (W)	Mahant Road (Vileparle)	Olectra X2 Electric Bus	Kurla
A-323	Vidyavihar Bus Station (W)	Sangharsh Nagar (Chandivali)	Olectra X2 Electric Bus	Kurla
324	Sadbhakti Mandir	Seepz Bus Station	MUT (Ashok Leyland CNG)	Majas
A-325	Kurla Station (W)	Ghatkopar Station (W)	Olectra X2 Electric Bus	Ghatkopar
A-326	Kurla Station (W)	Shivshahi Prakalp (Goregaon East)	Olectra X2 Electric Bus	Kurla
327	Goregaon Bus Station (E)	Shivshahi Prakalp (Goregaon East)	MUT (Tata Marcopolo CNG)	Dindoshi
A-329	Agarkar Chowk (Andheri East)	Shivaji Nagar Depot	Olectra X2 Electric Bus	Shivaji Nagar
A-330	Agarkar Chowk (Andheri East)	Kurla Station (W)	Olectra X2 Electric Bus	Kurla
A-331	Ghatkopar Station (W)	Sahar Cargo Complex	Olectra X2 Electric Bus	Ghatkopar
A-332	Agarkar Chowk (Andheri East)	Kurla Station (W)	Olectra X2 Electric Bus	Kurla
333	Agarkar Chowk (Andheri East)	Mahakali Caves	MUT (Tata Marcopolo CNG)	Majas
A-334	Marol Depot	Ghatkopar Station (W)	DAGA (Tata Marcopolo CNG Midi)	Ghatkopar
335	Agarkar Chowk (Andheri East)	Sangharsh Nagar (Chandivali)	MUT (Tata Marcopolo CNG)	Majas
A-336	Rani Laxmibai Chowk (Sion)	Antop Hill	Olectra X2 Electric Bus	Kalakilla
337	Agarkar Chowk (Andheri East)	Chhatrapati Shivaji Maharaj International Airport	MUT (Tata Marcopolo CNG)	Majas
338	Agarkar Chowk (Andheri East)	Sahar Cargo Complex	MUT (Tata Marcopolo CNG)	Majas
339	Majas Depot	Juhu Bus Station	ACGL built Tata LPO 1618	Majas
A-340	Agarkar Chowk (Andheri East)	Ghatkopar Station (W)	Olectra X2 Electric Bus	Ghatkopar
341	Antop Hill	Goregaon Bus Station (E)	MUT (Tata Marcopolo CNG	Pratiksha Nagar
342	Goregaon Bus Station (E)	Kokan Vikas Mahamandal (Aarey)	MUT (Tata Marcopolo CNG)	Dindoshi
A/343	Goregaon Bus Station (E)	Dadasaheb Phalke Chitranagri (Filmcity)	ACGL built Tata LPO 1618 and Olectra X2 Electric Bus	Dindoshi & Majas
344	Goregaon Bus Station (E)	Sankalp Society (Nagari Niwara)	MUT (Tata Marcopolo CNG)	Dindoshi
A-345	Gorai Depot	Santosh Nagar (Extension)	DAGA (Tata Marcopolo CNG Midi)	Gorai
346	Goregaon Bus Station (E)	Shivshahi Prakalp (Goregaon East)	MUT (Tata Marcopolo CNG)	Dindoshi
A-347	Goregaon Bus Station (E)	Gokuldham	Olectra X2 Electric Bus	Majas
348LTD	Dindoshi Depot	Pratiksha Nagar Depot	MUT (Tata Marcopolo CNG)	Dindoshi
349	Marol Depot	Santosh Nagar (Extension)	MUT (Tata Marcopolo CNG)	Dindoshi
A-350	Shivaji Nagar Bus Station	Kurla Bus Station (E)	TML (Tata Marcopolo EV)	Shivaji Nagar
A-351	Mumbai Central Depot	Tata Power Centre (Mahul)	Olectra X2 Electric Bus	Mumbai Central
352	Dharavi Depot	Trombay	MUT (Tata Marcopolo CNG)	Dharavi
A-354	Worli Depot	Kannamwar Nagar 2 (Vikhroli East)	Olectra X2 Electric Bus	Ghatkopar
A-356	Santacruz Depot	Tata Power Centre (Mahul)	Olectra X2 Electric Bus	Santacruz
A-357	Shivaji Nagar Bus Station	Mumbai Central Depot	TML (Tata Marcopolo EV)	Shivaji Nagar
A-359	Malvani Depot	Hiranandani Bus Station (Powai)	TML (Tata Marcopolo EV)	Malvani
A-360	Kurla Bus Station (E)	Trombay	DAGA (Tata Marcopolo CNG Midi)	Deonar
A-361	Kurla Bus Station (E)	Mahul Village	PMI Urban Electric Bus	Anik
A-362	Kurla Bus Station (E)	Dr.Ambedkar Udyan (Chembur)	DAGA (Tata Marcopolo CNG Midi)	Anik
A-363	Kurla Bus Station (E)	Mahul Village	DAGA (Tata Marcopolo CNG Midi)	Anik
A-364	Trombay	Mahul Village	DAGA (Tata Marcopolo CNG Midi)	Deonar
A-365	Kurla Station (W)	Sahar Cargo Complex	Olectra X2 Electric Bus	Kurla
A-366	Shivaji Nagar Depot	Bandra Bus Station (E)	TML (Tata Marcopolo EV)	Shivaji Nagar
A-367	Kurla Bus Station (E)	Gadkari Quarry	DAGA (Tata Marcopolo CNG Midi)	Anik
368LTD	Mulund Depot	Prabodhankar Thackeray Udyan (Sewri)	MUT (Ashok Leyland CNG)	Mulund
A-369	Kurla Bus Station (E)	Vashi Naka (Chembur)	DAGA (Tata Marcopolo CNG Midi)	Anik
A-370	MHADA Colony (Mulund East)	Kelkar College (Mulund)	DAGA (Tata Marcopolo CNG Midi)	Mulund
A-371	Shivaji Nagar Depot	Bandra Terminus	TML (Tata Marcopolo EV)	Shivaji Nagar
A-372	Ghatkopar Bus Station	Trombay	DAGA (Tata Marcopolo CNG Midi)	Ghatkopar
A-373	Vaishali Nagar (Mulund)	Mahul Village	DAGA (Tata Marcopolo CNG Midi)	Mulund
374	Santacruz Depot	Rani Laxmibai Chowk (Sion)	MUT (Tata Marcopolo CNG)	Santacruz
A-375	Shivaji Nagar Bus Station	Bandra Bus Station (W)	TML (Tata Marcopolo EV)	Shivaji Nagar
A-376	Shivaji Nagar Bus Station	Mahim Bus Station	TML (Tata Marcopolo EV)	Shivaji Nagar
A-377	Kurla Bus Station (E)	SRA Compound (Mankhurd)	DAGA (Tata Marcopolo CNG Midi)	Deonar
A-378	Mankhurd Station (S)	Trombay	DAGA (Tata Marcopolo CNG Midi)	Deonar
A-379	Shivaji Nagar Terminus	Ghatkopar Station (E)	TML (Tata Marcopolo EV)	Shivaji Nagar
A-380	Ghatkopar Station (E)	Trombay	DAGA (Tata Marcopolo CNG Midi)	Deonar
A-381	Ghatkopar Station (E)	Tata Power Centre (Mahul)	DAGA (Tata Marcopolo CNG Midi)	Deonar
382LTD	Anushakti Nagar (Deonar)	Sahar Cargo Complex	ACGL built Tata LPO 1618	Deonar
A-383	Shivaji Nagar Bus Station	Gadkari Quarry	TML (Tata Marcopolo EV)	Shivaji Nagar
A-385	Ghatkopar Station (W)	Comrade P.K. Kurne Chowk (Worli)	DAGA (Tata Marcopolo CNG Midi)	Ghatkopar
A-386	Ghatkopar Station (W)	Nagbaba Mandir	DAGA (Tata Marcopolo CNG Midi)	Ghatkopar
A-387	Ghatkopar Station (W)	Vikhroli Park Site	DAGA (Tata Marcopolo CNG Midi)	Ghatkopar
A-389	Ghatkopar Station (W)	Barve Nagar (Ghatkopar)	DAGA (Tata Marcopolo CNG Midi)	Ghatkopar
A-391	Mulund Station (W)	Khindipada	DAGA (Tata Marcopolo CNG Midi)	Mulund
A-392	Majas Depot	Vikhroli Depot	Olectra X2 Electric Bus	Vikhroli
A-394	Vikhroli Station (E)	Kannamwar Nagar 2 (Vikhroli East)	Olectra X2 Electric Bus	Vikhroli
A-396	Agarkar Chowk (Andheri East)	Maharana Pratap Chowk (Mulund West)	DAGA (Tata Marcopolo CNG Midi)	Mulund
A-397	Vikhroli Station (E)	Kannamwar Nagar 2 (Vikhroli East)	Olectra X2 Electric Bus	Vikhroli
398LTD	Dindoshi Depot	Maharana Pratap Chowk (Mulund West)	MUT (Ashok Leyland CNG)	Mulund
A-399	Anushakti Nagar (Deonar)	Maharana Pratap Chowk (Mulund West)	DAGA (Tata Marcopolo CNG Midi)	Deonar
A-401	Mulund Station (W)	Vaishali Nagar (Mulund)	DAGA (Tata Marcopolo CNG Midi)	Mulund
A-402	Mulund Station (W)	Vaishali Nagar (Mulund)	DAGA (Tata Marcopolo CNG Midi)	Mulund
A-403	Agarkar Chowk (Andheri East)	MHADA Colony (Mulund East)	DAGA (Tata Marcopolo CNG Midi)	Mulund
A-404	Shivaji Nagar Depot	Ghatkopar Station (E)	TML (Tata Marcopolo EV)	Shivaji Nagar
A-405	Mulund Station (W)	Yogi Hills	DAGA (Tata Marcopolo CNG Midi)	Mulund
406	Ghatkopar Station (E)	Railway Police Colony (Ghatkopar)	Tejaswini Eicher Midi Bus	Ghatkopar
A-409	Maharana Pratap Chowk (Mulund West)	Sahar Cargo Complex	DAGA (Tata Marcopolo CNG Midi)	Mulund
A-410	Vikhroli Depot	Mahakali Caves/ Kondivita Caves (Jogeshwari East)	Olectra X2 Electric Bus	Vikhroli
411	Wadala Depot	Sangharsh Nagar (Chandivali)	MUT (Ashok Leyland CNG)	Wadala
A-412	Mulund Station (W)	Ghatipada (Mulund)	DAGA (Tata Marcopolo CNG Midi)	Mulund
A-414	Mulund Station (W)	Nahur Bus Station	DAGA (Tata Marcopolo CNG Midi)	Mulund
A-415	Agarkar Chowk (Andheri East)	Seepz Bus Station	Olectra X2 Electric Bus & Switch DD Electric Bus	Majas & Kurla
A-416	Ghatkopar Station (W)	Amrut Nagar (Ghatkopar (W))	DAGA (Tata Marcopolo CNG Midi)	Ghatkopar
418	Vikhroli Station (W)	Nagbaba Mandir	Olectra K7 Electric Bus	Vikhroli
A-419	Ghatkopar Depot	Sangharsh Nagar (Chandivali)	Olectra X2 Electric Bus	Ghatkopar
A-421	Ghatkopar Station (W)	MHADA Colony (Chandivali)	DAGA (Tata Marcopolo CNG Midi)	Ghatkopar
A-422	Bandra Bus Station (W)	Vikhroli Depot	Olectra X2 Electric Bus	Vikhroli
A-423	Maharana Pratap Chowk (Mulund West)	Sangharsh Nagar (Chandivali)	DAGA (Tata Marcopolo CNG Midi)	Mulund
A-424	Oshiwara Depot	Mulund Station (W)	PMI Urban Electric Bus	Oshiwara
A-425	Vesave-Yari Road Bus Station	Chhatrapati Shivaji Maharaj Talao (Bhandup)	PMI Urban Electric Bus	Oshiwara
426	Vidyavihar Bus Station (W)	Filterpada	ACGL built Tata LPO 1618	Kurla
A-427	Ghatkopar Depot	Filterpada	DAGA (Tata Marcopolo CNG Midi)	Ghatkopar
428	Sadbhakti Mandir	Chhatrapati Shivaji Maharaj Talao (Bhandup)	MUT (Ashok Leyland/Tata Marcopolo CNG)	Majas
A-430	Ghatkopar Station (E)	Mahul Village	DAGA (Tata Marcopolo CNG Midi)	Ghatkopar
A-431	Kurla Bus Station (E)	Tata Power Centre (Mahul)	DAGA (Tata Marcopolo CNG Midi)	Anik
A-432	Kurla Bus Station (E)	Lal Dongar (Chembur)	DAGA (Tata Marcopolo CNG Midi)	Anik
A-433	J.V.P.D. Bus Station	Ghatkopar Depot	Olectra X2 Electric Bus	Ghatkopar
434	Agarkar Chowk (Andheri East)	Bamandaya Pada	MUT (Tata Marcopolo CNG)	Majas
C-440	Wadala Depot	Borivali Station (E)	MUT (Ashok Leyland CNG)	Wadala
441	Agarkar Chowk (Andheri East)	Majas Depot	MUT (Tata Marcopolo CNG)	Majas
442	MHADA Colony (Majas)	Sadbhakti Mandir	ACGL built Tata LPO 1618	Majas
443	Agarkar Chowk (Andheri East)	Bamandaya Pada	MUT (Tata Marcopolo CNG)	Majas
446	Kurla Station (W)	Bamandaya Pada	ACGL built Tata LPO 1618	Kurla
447	Goregaon Bus Station (E)	Santosh Nagar (Extension)	ACGL built Tata LPO 1618	Dindoshi
449	Dindoshi Bus Station	SRP Camp (Jogeshwari)	ACGL built Tata LPO 1618	Dindoshi
A-451	Goregaon Bus Station (E)	Adarsh Nagar (Aarey)	Olectra X2 Electric Bus	Majas
A-452	Goregaon Bus Station (E)	Mayur Nagar	Olectra X2 Electric Bus	Majas
A-453	Ghatkopar Depot	Lokmanya Nagar (Thane)	DAGA (Tata Marcopolo CNG Midi)	Ghatkopar
A-454	Seven Bungalows Bus Station	Shivshahi Prakalp (Goregaon East)	PMI Urban Electric Bus	Oshiwara
456	Malvani Depot	Shivshahi Prakalp (Goregaon East)	ACGL built Tata LPO 1618	Malvani
A-458	Deonar Depot	Borivali Station (E)	DAGA (Tata Marcopolo CNG Midi)	Deonar
A-459	Malvani Depot	Mulund Station (W)	TML (Tata Marcopolo EV)	Malvani
460LTD	Gorai Depot	Mulund Station (W)	ACGL built Tata LPO 1618	Mulund
A-461	Prabodhankar Thackeray Nagar (Charkop) Bus Station	Maharana Pratap Chowk (Mulund West)	Olectra X2 Electric Bus	Gorai
A-462	Borivali Station (E)	Vaishali Nagar (Dahisar)	DAGA (Tata Marcopolo CNG Midi)	Gorai
A-463	Veer Hutatma Bhai Kotwal Udyan (Plaza)	Dharavi Depot	Olectra K7 Electric Bus	Kalakilla
A-464	Oshiwara Depot	Ghatkopar Bus Station	Olectra X2 Electric Bus	Ghatkopar
A-465	Marol Depot	Prabodhankar Thackeray Nagar (Charkop) Bus Station	Olectra X2 Electric Bus	Gorai
A-469	Oshiwara Depot	Maharana Pratap Chowk (Mulund West)	PMI Urban Electric Bus	Oshiwara
A-470	Ghatkopar Bus Station	Borivali Station (E)	Olectra X2 Electric Bus	Ghatkopar
A-473	Santacruz Depot	Mahul Village	Olectra X2 Electric Bus	Santacruz
A-477	Borivali Station (E)	Rushivan (Borivali)	DAGA (Tata Marcopolo CNG Midi)	Magathane
A-478	Vikhroli Depot	Borivali Station (E)	Olectra X2 Electric Bus	Vikhroli
A-479	Borivali Station (E)	Janta Nagar	DAGA (Tata Marcopolo CNG Midi)	Magathane
A-481	Ghatkopar Station (E)	Vashi Naka (Chembur)	DAGA (Tata Marcopolo CNG Midi)	Ghatkopar
A-484	MHADA Colony (Mulund East)	Pawar Nagar (Thane)	DAGA (Tata Marcopolo CNG Midi)	Mulund
A-488	Shivaji Nagar Bus Station	Dindoshi Bus Station	Olectra X2 Electric Bus	Shivaji Nagar
489LTD	Shivaji Nagar Depot	Dindoshi Depot	ACGL built Tata LPO 1618	Shivaji Nagar
A-490	Mantralaya	Dadlani Park (Thane West)	Olectra X2 Electric Bus	Ghatkopar
A-491	Rani Laxmibai Chowk (Sion)	Dadlani Park (Thane West)	Olectra X2 Electric Bus	Kalakilla
A-492	Majas Depot	Bhoomi Acres (Waghbil Thane)	Olectra X2 Electric Bus	Majas
A-493	Deonar Depot	Maharana Pratap Chowk (Mulund West)	DAGA (Tata Marcopolo CNG Midi)	Deonar
A-494	Ghatkopar Bus Station	Retibunder Kharegaon (Kalwa)	Olectra X2 Electric Bus	Ghatkopar
496LTD	Agarkar Chowk (Andheri East)	Marathon Chowk (Thane Flyover)	MUT (Tata Marcopolo CNG Midi)	Majas
A-498	Borivali Station (E)	Sangharsh Nagar (Chandivali)	Olectra X2 Electric Bus	Magathane
A-499	Ghatkopar Bus Station	Vrindavan Society (Thane)	Olectra X2 Electric Bus	Ghatkopar
501LTD	Kurla Bus Station (E)	Airoli Bus Station	MUT (Ashok Leyland CNG)	Pratiksha Nagar
A-502	Shivaji Nagar Bus Station	Nerul Sector 46/48	Olectra X2 Electric Bus	Shivaji Nagar
A-504	Shivaji Nagar Depot	Jalvayu Vihar (Kharghar)	Olectra X2 Electric Bus	Shivaji Nagar
A-C-505	Santacruz Depot	CBD Belapur	Olectra X2 Electric Bus	Santacruz
A-507	Santacruz Station (E)	Nerul Bus Station	Olectra X2 Electric Bus	Kurla
512LTD	Maharana Pratap Chowk (Mulund West)	Nerul Bus Station	MUT (Ashok Leyland CNG)	Mulund
C-513	Mulund Depot	Vashi Station	MUT (Ashok Leyland CNG)	Mulund
A-517	Santacruz Station (E)	Vashi Sector 19	Olectra X2 Electric Bus	Kurla
C-521	Wadala Depot	Ghansoli Village	MUT (Ashok Leyland CNG)	Wadala
522LTD	Majas Depot	Millennium Business Park (Mahape)	MUT (Ashok Leyland CNG)	Majas
A-523	Borivali Station (E)	Airoli Bus Station	Olectra X2 Electric Bus	Magathane
A-525	Majas Depot	Vashi Station	Olectra X2 Electric Bus	Majas
A-533	Ghatkopar Bus Station	Vashi Sector 19	Olectra X2 Electric Bus	Ghatkopar
545LTD	Agarkar Chowk (Andheri East)	Airoli Bus Station	MUT (Ashok Leyland CNG)	Majas
601	Malad Station (E)	Triveni Nagar (Malad East)	Tejaswini Eicher Midi Bus	Dindoshi
A-602	Kanjurmarg Station (W)	Hiranandani Bus Station (Powai)	Olectra X2 Electric Bus	Vikhroli
603	RCF Colony (Bhandup)	Amrut Nagar (Vikhroli)	ACGL built Tata LPO 1618	Vikhroli
A-604	Bhandup Station (W)	Kanjurmarg Station (W)	Olectra K7 Electric Bus	Vikhroli
605	Bhandup Station (W)	Tembhipada Naka	Olectra K7 Electric Bus	Vikhroli
A-606	Bhandup Station (W)	Ashok Kedare Chowk	Olectra K7 Electric Bus	Vikhroli
A-607	Bhandup Station (W)	Tulshet Pada	Olectra K7 Electric Bus	Vikhroli
608	Kanjurmarg Station (W)	Hanuman Nagar (Bhandup)	Olectra K7 Electric Bus	Vikhroli
612	Bhandup Station (W)	Hanuman Nagar (Bhandup)	Olectra K7 Electric Bus	Vikhroli
613	Vidyavihar Bus Station (W)	Sundar Baug (Kamani)	Tejaswini Eicher Midi Bus	Kurla
618	Santacruz Station (E)	Datta Mandir (Vakola)	Tejaswini Eicher Midi Bus	Kurla
A-620	Malad Depot	Malad Station (W)	TML (Tata Marcopolo EV)	Malvani
A-621	Malad Station (W)	Ushma Nagar	TML (Tata Marcopolo EV)	Malvani
A-622	Malad Station (W)	Jankalyan Nagar Police Station	TML (Tata Marcopolo EV)	Malvani
A-624	Poddar Park (Malad)	Anand Nagar (Appa Pada)	DAGA (Tata Marcopolo CNG Midi)	Magathane
A-626	Malad Station (W)	Bhujale Talao	TML (Tata Marcopolo EV)	Malvani
627	Andheri Station (W)	Mora Village	Tejaswini Eicher Midi Bus	Santacruz
A-629	Borivali Station (E)	Samta Nagar (Kandivali)	DAGA (Tata Marcopolo CNG Midi)	Magathane
A-636	Borivali Station (E)	Kranti Nagar		Magathane
646	Goregaon Bus Station (E)	Nagari Niwara Zone 1–2	MUT (Tata Marcopolo CNG)	Dindoshi
A-663	Deonar Depot	Mahul Village	DAGA (Tata Marcopolo CNG Midi)	Deonar
691	Mulund Station (W)	Amar Nagar	ACGL built Tata LPO 1618	Mulund
A-696	Dahisar Station (E)	Kokani Pada (Extension)	DAGA (Tata Marcopolo CNG Midi)	Magathane
A-698	Borivali Station (E)	N.G. Park	DAGA (Tata Marcopolo CNG Midi)	Magathane
A-700	Magathane Depot	Thane Station (E)	Olectra X2 Electric Bus	Magathane
A-701	Samta Nagar (Kandivali)	Mira Road Station (E)	DAGA (Tata Marcopolo CNG)	Magathane
A-702	Magathane Depot	Ghodbunder Village	Olectra X2 Electric Bus	Magathane
A-703	Samta Nagar (Kandivali)	Mira Road Station (E)	Olectra X2 Electric Bus	Magathane
705LTD	Dindoshi Depot	Western Park (Kashimira)	MUT (Tata Marcopolo CNG)	Dindoshi
706LTD	Marol Depot	Bhayander Station (E)	ACGL built Tata LPO 1618	Marol
707LTD	Goregaon Depot	Bhayander Station (E)	ACGL built Tata LPO 1618	Goregaon
A-709	Magathane Depot	Bhayander Station (E)	Olectra X2 Electric Bus	Magathane
710LTD	Magathane Depot	Bhayander Station (W)	ACGL built Tata LPO 1618	Magathane
C-718	Dindoshi Bus Station	Bhayander Station (E)	MUT (Tata Marcopolo CNG)	Dindoshi
A-814	Dadar Station (W)	Dadar Station (W)	TML (Tata Marcopolo EV)	Worli
BKC-1	Bandra (E) Bus Station	Diamond Bourse (BKC)	MUT (Tata Marcopolo CNG)	Dharavi
A-BKC-2	Kurla Station (W)	Swavalamban Bhavan (BKC)	Olectra X2 Electric Bus	Kurla
BKC-3	Bandra (E) Bus Station	C.A. Institute (BKC)	MUT (Tata Marcopolo CNG)	Dharavi

=== Taxis ===
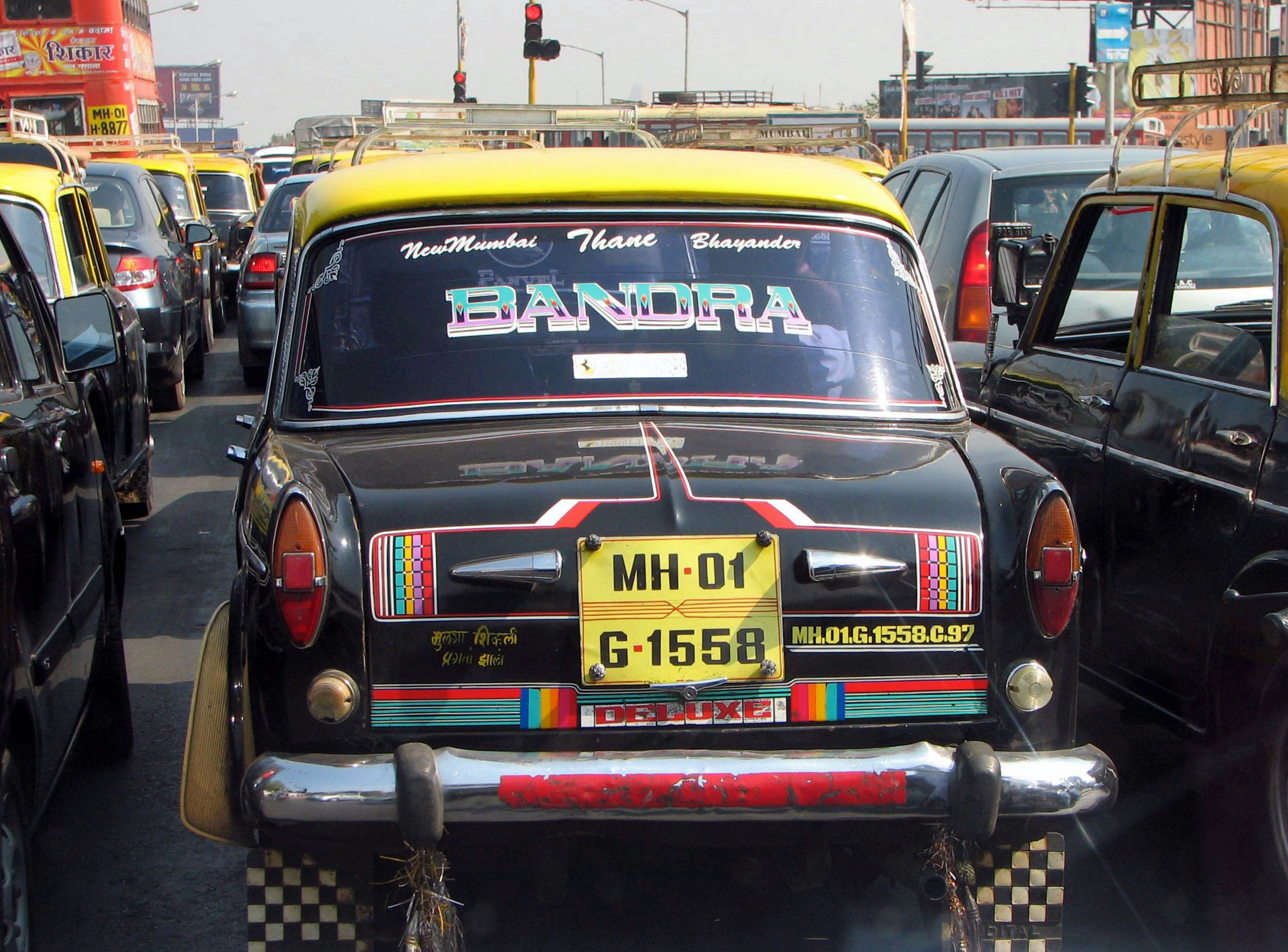
An iconic Premier Padmini taxi in Mumbai

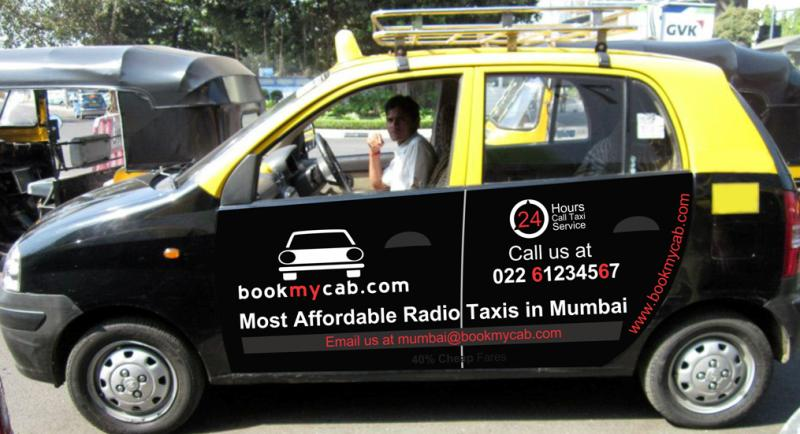
Cars like the Hyundai Santro have replaced Mumbai's iconic Premier Padmini cabs.

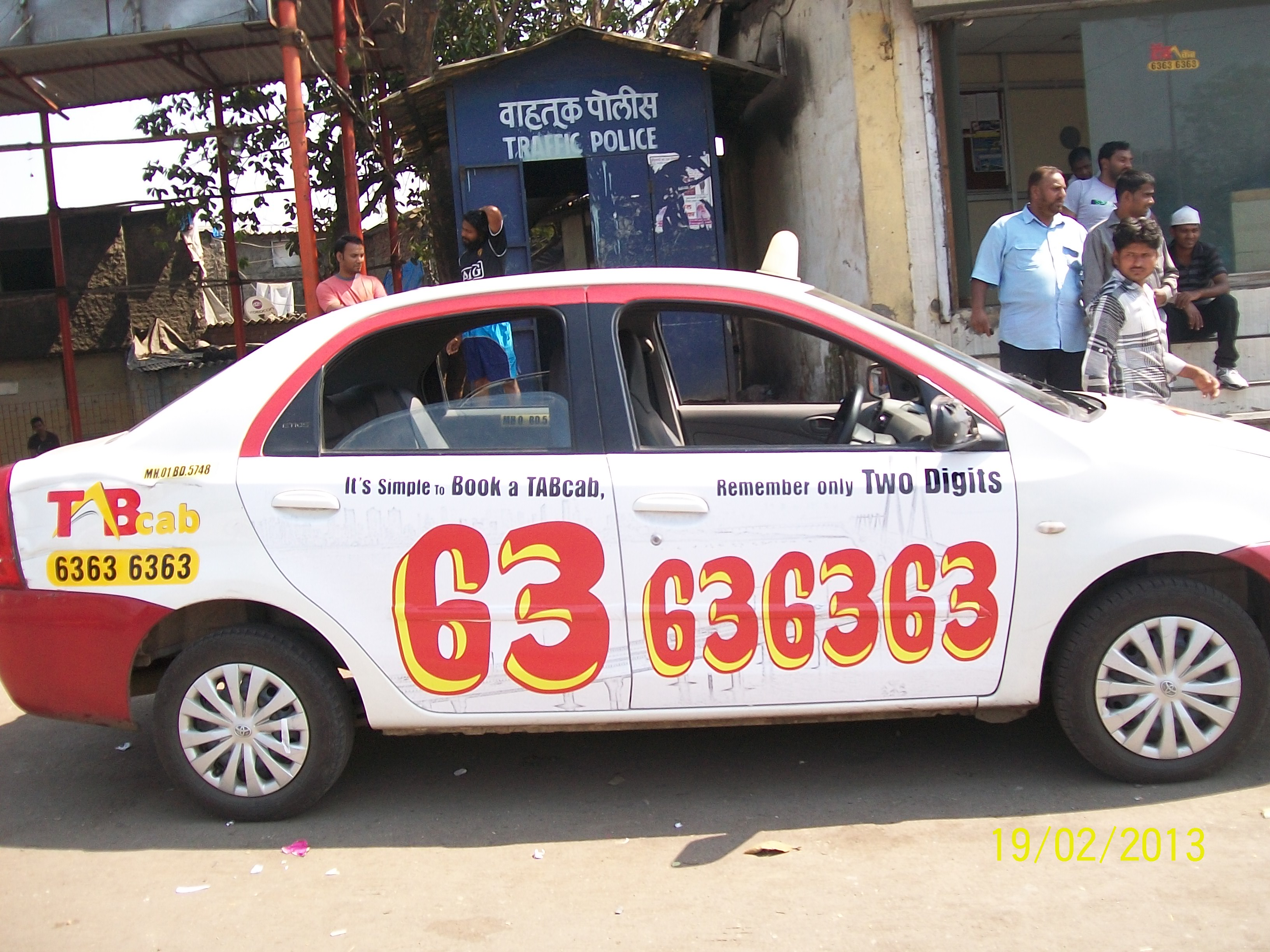
A Radio Cab in Mumbai

Taxis arrived in 1911 to complement horse cars. Black and yellow Fiat taxis are an integral part of the city's heritage and have been depicted in numerous Bollywood movies. Metered taxis ply throughout Mumbai and have a monopoly from Bandra to Churchgate on the Western line, and from Sion to Chhatrapati Shivaji Terminus on the Central line. Beyond Sion and Bandra, auto rickshaws are not allowed, and one has to hire a taxi. However, between Sion to Thane and Bandra to Bhayandar, both taxis and autorickshaws are available to transport passengers.

==== Number of taxis ====
There are around 58,000 taxis in Greater Mumbai and 98,566 in Mumbai MMR as of 2010.

There are 18,000 black and yellow taxis on Mumbai roads as of 2024, consisting of cars like the Maruti Alto, Ritz, Wagon R, and Omni, Tata Indica and Hyundai Santro.

==== Taxi Regulations ====
BMC Law requires the driver of an unengaged taxi or auto rickshaw to take a passenger wherever they want to go, regardless of distance or time, if the fare meter of the unengaged rickshaw/taxi is in a 'For Hire' mode. The modes were denoted by older mechanical meters in this manner: a) upright – for hire b) half mast – not doing business c), facing down-currently hired.

Authorities encourage passengers to make complaints, for refusal to convey, excess fare, tampered meters, fake tariff cards, or misconduct by drivers, by direct email as well as by a website.

=== Rickshaws ===
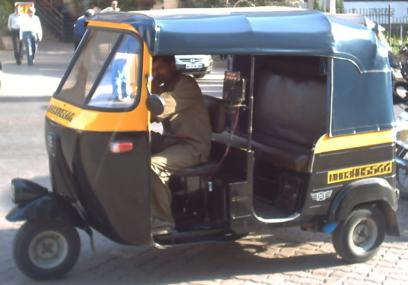
Auto Rickshaw in Mumbai

Auto rickshaws play an important role in public transport in Mumbai. There are 246,458 black-and-yellow metered auto rickshaws, often simply called autos, rickshaws, or simply ricks, in the Mumbai MMR as of 2008. Since 2002, all auto rickshaws have been required to use CNG as fuel. However, not all rickshaws comply. In some areas, if a CNG filling facility is not available, the fuel is either petrol or LPG.

Auto rickshaws are not permitted to enter Old Bombay (South Mumbai) . The southernmost points accessible to them are Bandra Fire Station in Western Mumbai and Sion Bus Depot in Central Mumbai, and Rani Laxmibai Chowk in Sion, Mumbai. Auto rickshaws registered in Mumbai are not allowed travel beyond the municipal limits. They have been allowed to travel between Sion to Mulund in the Central Suburbs and up to Mankhurd on the Harbour line. People who wish to travel beyond Mumbai to suburbs like Vashi and Airoli have to catch a suburban rickshaw. In the western suburbs, they are allowed to travel between Bandra and Bhayandar only.

A mechanical meter decides the fare, which is proportional to distance traveled. The Mumbai Metropolitan Region Transport Authority (MMRTA) updated the auto-rickshaw fares and declared a hike recently, which is applied from 1 March 2021. The regulation for auto rickshaws is similar to taxis, and methods of complaining against the auto rickshaws and taxis are available on the Mumbai RTO website.

=== Survey ===
In 2021, UK-based car-sharing company Hiyacar announced in a survey that Mumbai is the most stressful city in the world for driving. Public transportation options are one of the main factors that were observed for the survey.

== Rail ==
Map showing all of the railway services in Mumbai, including the Metro, Monorail, and Suburban services

=== Mumbai Suburban Railway ===
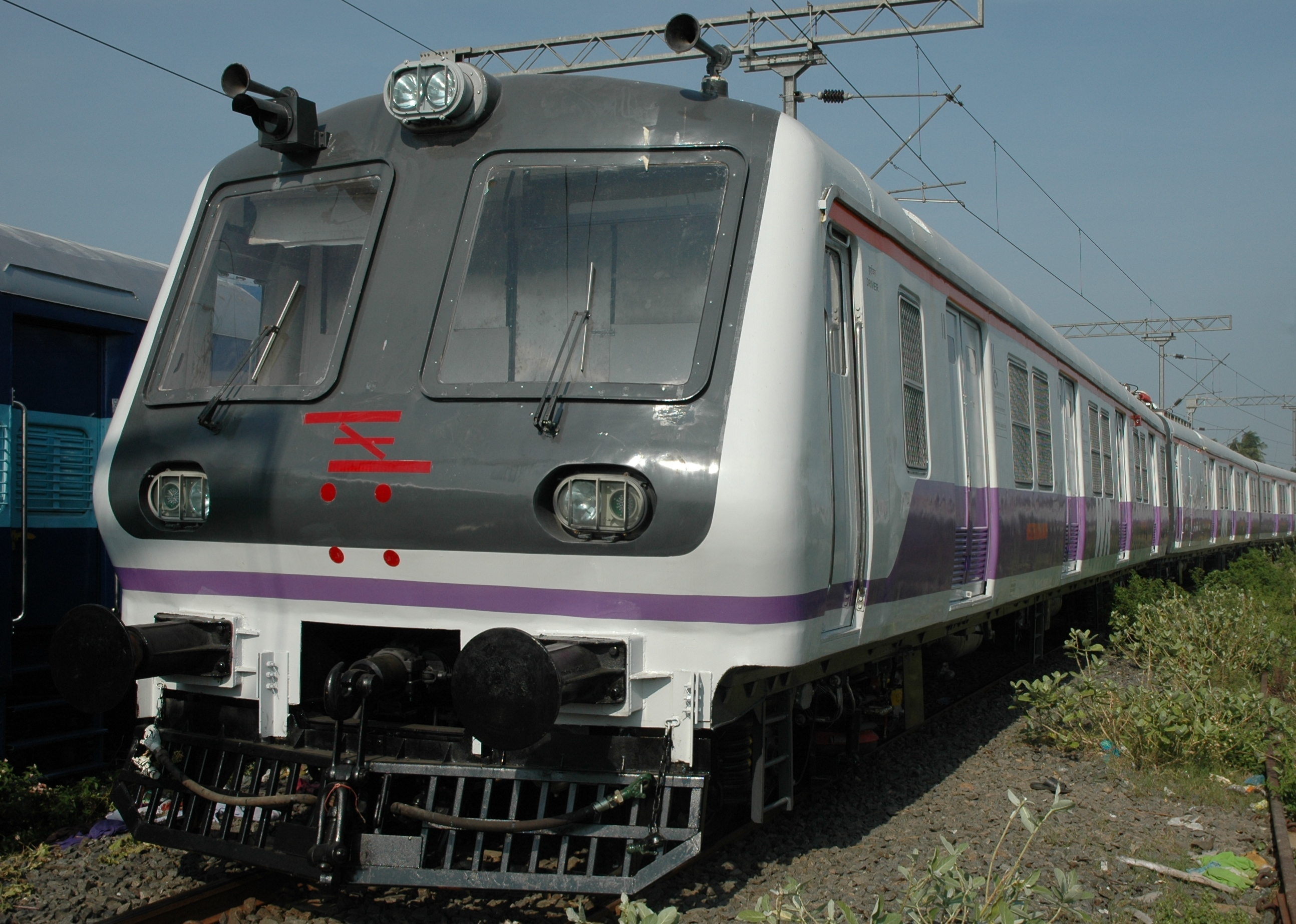
Mumbai Suburban Railway

The Mumbai Suburban Railway is the oldest commuter rail in Asia, founded in 1853. It is owned by Indian Railways and operated by its Western Railways and Central Railways divisions. Most economical transport subsidized by the government of India via Railway ministry. With a length of 430 km, it has highest passenger density in the world, 7.5 million people daily, more than half of daily capacity of Indian Railways. It has four radial lines:

- Western, running between Churchgate and Dahanu Road
- Central, running between Chhatrapati Shivaji Maharaj Terminus (CSMT) and Kasara/Khopoli
- Harbour, running between Chhatrapati Shivaji Maharaj Terminus (CSMT) and Panvel/Goregaon
- Trans-Harbour, running between Thane and Vashi/Nerul
- Port, running between Uran and Nerul/CBD Belapur
- Vasai Road–Roha line, running between Vasai Road/Diva Junction and Panvel/Roha

Mumbai railways offer first class commuter transport. First class fares are approximately 10 times the second class fare which is ₹10 or ₹15 whearas First class costs ₹100 to ₹145 and tend to be less crowded in the non-rush hour period. First class compartments also have slightly better seats than second class. While less crowded during non-peak hours, the first class compartments are rather more crowded during the peak hour time, as there is a large supply and demand gap. It is notoriously hard to get into the first class compartment as the coach is overcrowded with people hanging out of the doors.

Since 2017, Mumbai Suburban Rail became the first in India to operate Air-Conditioned rakes in its Western and Central line. These rakes are equipped with automatic doors and are vestibuled in a 12-coach configuration with coaches 1 to 6 vestibuled, motor connection between coaches 6 and 7 and coaches 7 to 12 again vestibuled. There are also women-only cars (termed 'ladies'), and since 1992, 'Ladies Special' trains with all coaches reserved for women passengers.

=== Metro ===
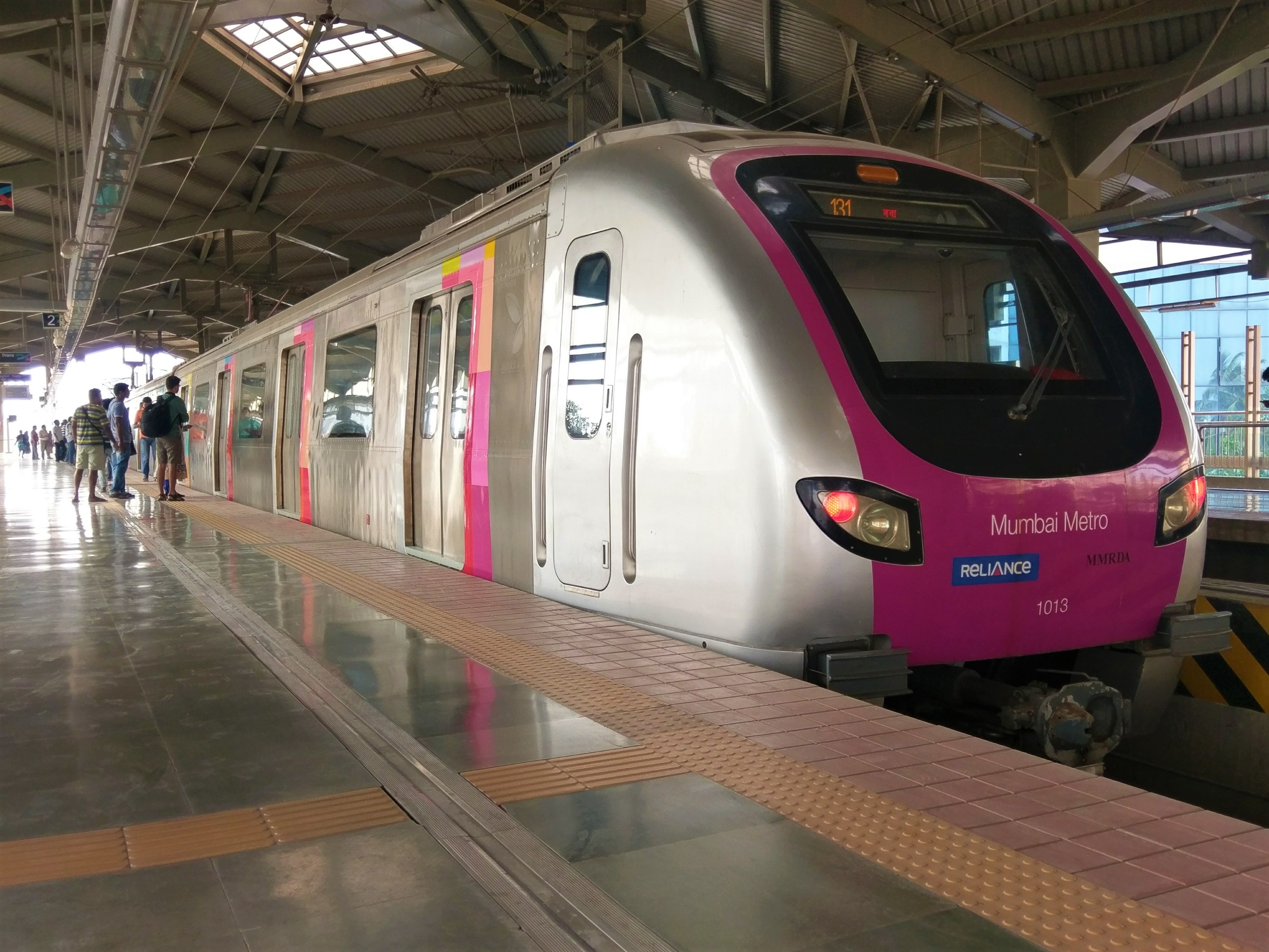
Mumbai Metro

In January 2004, a master transit plan was unveiled by the Mumbai Metropolitan Region Development Authority (MMRDA). The plan integrated a 146 kilometer-long metro system, of which 32 km would be underground.

In June 2004, government approval was given for a 12-station elevated line between Ghatkopar and Versova. In June 2006, the first phase of the Mumbai Metro project was inaugurated. Construction work began in February 2008. A successful trial run was conducted in May 2013, and the system's first line entered operation in June 2014, although some aspects of the project were afflicted by delays and cost issues. The Mumbai Metro opened on 8 June 2014. On 2 April 2022, Metro line 2A and 7 were inaugurated, these two lines have a combined length of 19,25 km and will reduce the traffic congestion in North Mumbai. The first line of the Navi Mumbai Metro was inaugurated on 17 November 2023. The Mumbai Metro Aqua Line was inaugurated in October 2025 by Prime Minister of India Narendra Modi.

Many more lines are under-construction or planned having a total length of 345 km (215 mi), which includes new lines in the Navi Mumbai Metro and the Thane Metro, which is to be developed independently of the rest of the Mumbai Metro system.

=== Monorail ===
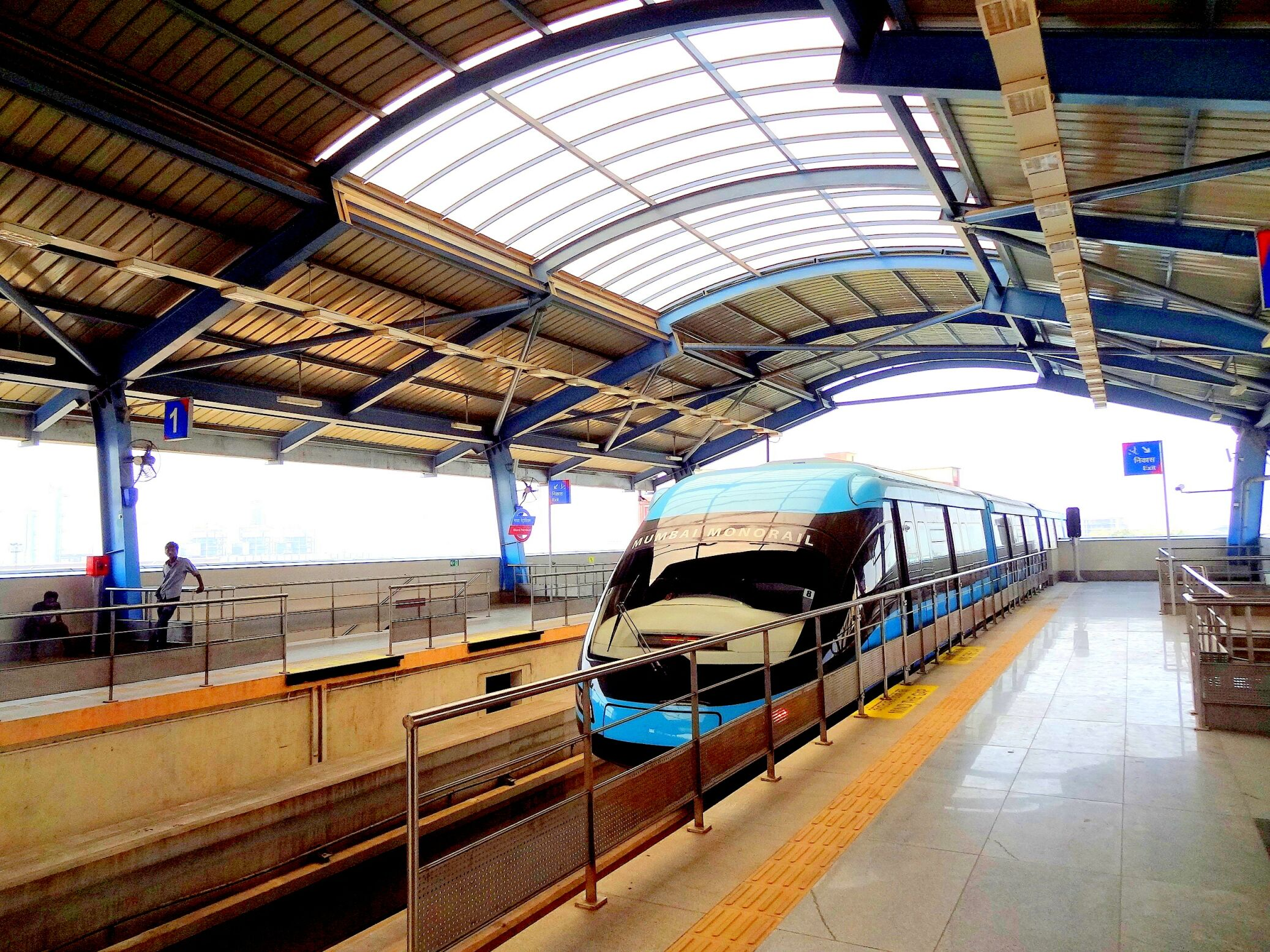
Monorail arrival inside station

The Mumbai Monorail is a monorail system for the city of Mumbai. Construction began in January 2009 and the first operational line was inaugurated on 1 February 2014. It is being contracted by the Mumbai Metropolitan Region Development Authority and is the first monorail in India.

Four lines were proposed. The first two are 25 kilometres (16 mi) long. Out of the two, Line 1 was opened to the public in 2014.

- Initial plans were to build a line running from Malabar Hill to the Bandra-Kurla complex via the Haji Ali Dargah, Jacob Circle, Wadala Road, Sion Hospital and Dharavi. This was planned to have been opened by 2011.
- A line from Thane to Bhiwandi via Kalyan was proposed. A consultant's report to government has recommended that this corridor be served instead by a road-based system for the next 10–15 years using buses and bus rapid transit.

Two lines 10 kilometres (6.2 mi) long were to be constructed after the first two have opened.

- Chembur to Jacob Circle via Mahul. This route is planned to have been opened by December 2010. (May get extended to Vashi, Navi Mumbai.)
- Lokhandwala Complex to Kanjur Marg via Oshiwara.

Additionally, previously planned Mumbai Metro corridors are also being examined to be made as monorail corridors instead of the metro by MMRDA due to the dense and congested areas these corridors pass through. The corridors are:

- Hutatma Chowk – Ghatkopar – 21.8 km
- Ghatkopar – Mulund – 12.4 km

=== Bullet Train ===
The 650 km Mumbai-Ahemdabad Bullet train project is another major high-speed rail project that is supposed to run between Mumbai and Ahmedabad is poised to revolutionize travel time between these two major cities which usually would take about 7 to 8 hours to a meager 2hrs 57mins. This would create demand for real estate in key areas such as Thane, Kalyan-Dombivli and Vasai-Virar.

=== Trams ===
Trams were an important form of transport until the mid-1960s. They were introduced in the late 19th century and in their heyday, covered many areas of the city. At their peak, route length grew to more than 47 kilometers. The system closed down in 1964.

== Ferry ==
Ferry between Versova and Madh Island

Many ferries operate from Mumbai at designated ferry terminals like Madh Island, Elephanta, Manori, Versova, Belapur, Alibaug, Mandwa, Rewas, the Gateway of India and the Ferry Wharf (Bhaucha Dhakka). A Water Metro on the basis of the KWM has also been proposed for the city.

- from Vashi (in Navi Mumbai) to the Gateway of India
- to Elephanta Caves and to nearby places such as Alibaug, Rewas, and Mandwa
- in northern Mumbai across the Manori Creek. The barges operate at regular intervals across the shallow creek linking Manori to Malad
- from Versova to Madh Island
- from Nariman point to madh, operated by Brihanmumbai Electric Supply and Transport, as a ferry terminal called the Western Corridor

== Flights ==
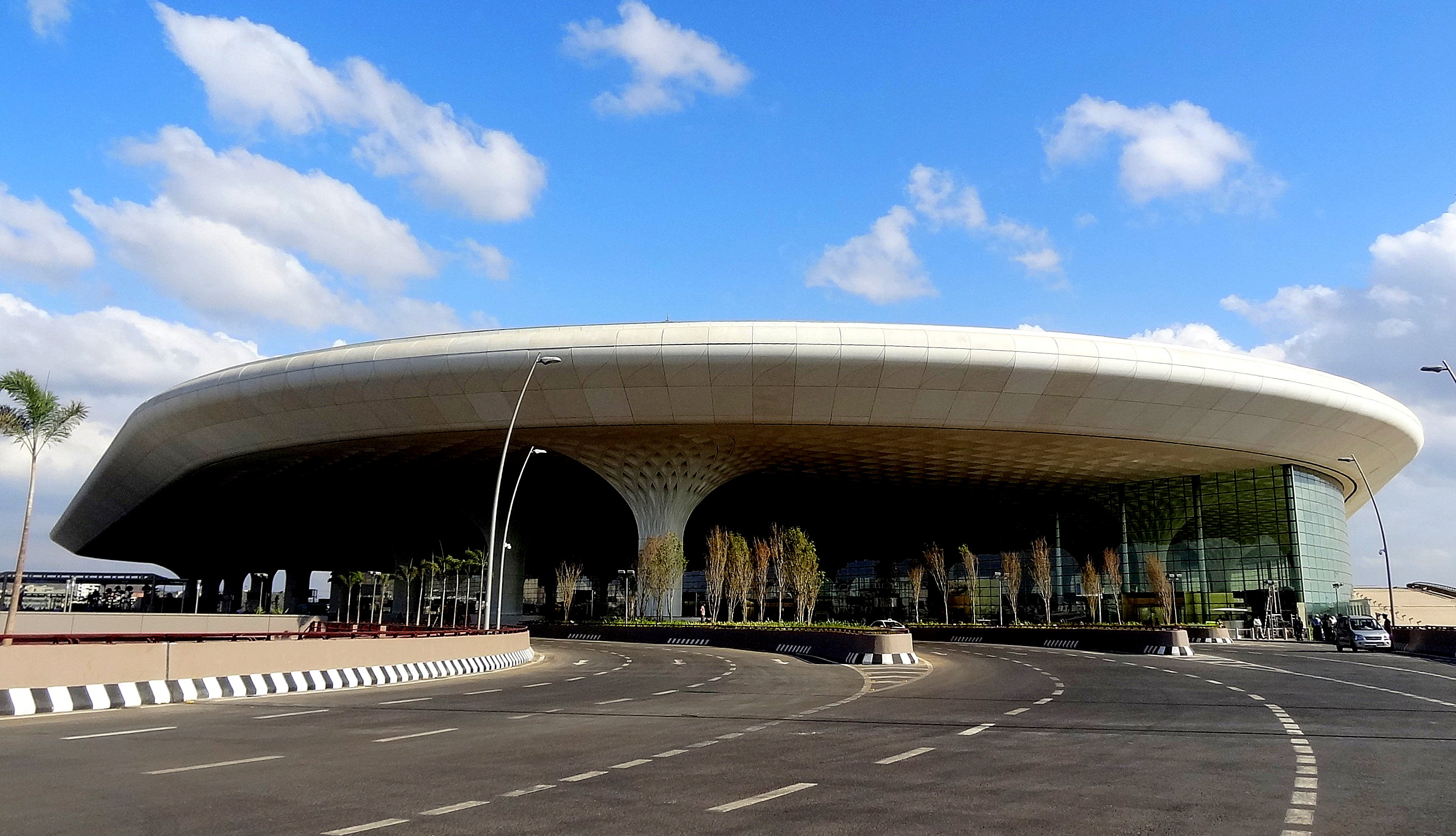
Terminal 2 or T2, A view From SEAR

The Chhatrapati Shivaji Maharaj International Airport (formerly Sahar International Airport) is the main aviation hub in the city and the second busiest airport in India in terms of passenger traffic. It handled 54.8 million passengers in 2024.

The new integrated terminal T2 was inaugurated on 10 January 2014 and opened for international operations on 12 February 2014, increasing the capacity of the airport to 40 million passengers annually. A dedicated six lane, elevated road connecting the new terminal with the main arterial Western Express Highway was also opened to the public the same day.

The Navi Mumbai International Airport is in the Kopra-Panvel area and relieved the increasing traffic burden on the existing airport. The airport was inaugurated on Dec 28, 2025, but international operations are stopped due to the USA-Iran Gulf War.

== See also ==
- Mumbai Urban Transport Project
- Timeline of Mumbai events
- Transport in India
- M-Indicator
