= KDMT =

KDMT may refer to:

- KDMT (AM), a radio station (1690 AM) licensed to serve Arvada, Colorado, United States
- Kalyan-Dombivli Municipal Transport, public transport company operating in India
