= Thane Municipal Transport =

- Parent: Thane Municipal Corporation
- Founded: 9 February 1989
- Headquarters: Wagle Depot, Wagle Estate, Thane (West)-400604
- Locale: Thane metropolitan area
- Service area: Thane; Diva; Kalwa-Mumbra; Mumbai; Bhiwandi; Mira-Bhayandar; Navi Mumbai; Kalyan-Dombivli; Vasai-Virar
- Service type: Local bus Limited bus Express bus Air conditioned (AC) bus
- Operator: Thane Municipal Transport Undertaking
- Privahan Sabhapati: Dashrath Sankataprasad Yadav
- Website: Transport Department Thane City

Thane Municipal Transport (T.M.T) is a civic transport public company based in Thane, Maharashtra. T.M.T comes under Thane Municipal Corporation. It operates service in Thane city and into neighboring cities like Mumbai, Navi Mumbai, Kalyan-Dombivli, Bhiwandi, Mira-Bhayandar and Vasai-Virar.

== History ==
Thane Municipal Corporation started its own transport service on 9 February 1989, known as T.M.T. It is the major bus service provider in Thane.

T.M.T operates all bus depots in Thane. The biggest depot is at Wagle Estate. TMT stores its buses inside Thane city and also towards Kalwa & Mumbra. Buses operate from Thane to Bhiwandi, Mira Road, Mulund, Borivali, Andheri, Nallasopara, BKC and Dombivli.

Info	Details
Number of Buses	504
Number of Routes	117
Number of Depot	5 1) Kalwa Depot 2) Wagle Estate Depot 3) Mulla Bagh Depot 4) Anand Nagar Depot 5) Kolshet Depot (Proposed)
Number of Bus Stands	20
Number of Bus Stops	374
Running K.M. Per Day	63135
No of Bus Trips per Day	7114
Bus Travellers Per Day	480017
Daily Income Rs.	42,86,994/-
Running K.M. Per day Per Bus	211
Number of Employees	1113

== See also ==
- Transportation in Thane
- BEST
- KDMT
- MBMT
- NMMT
- VVMT
