= Mira-Bhayandar Municipal Transport =

Indian public transport service

Mira-Bhayandar Municipal Transport (MBMT)
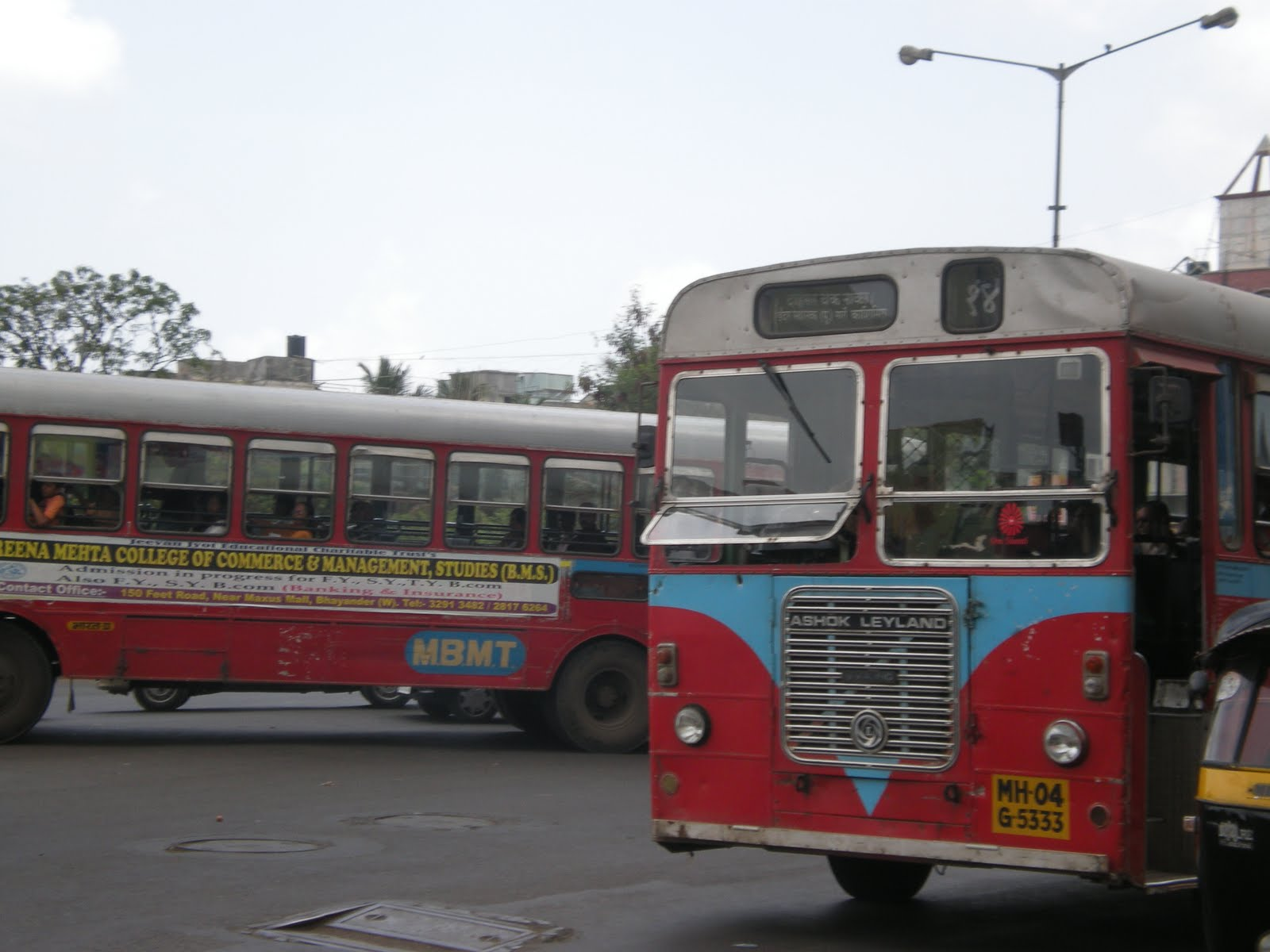
- MBMT bus
- Parent: Mira-Bhayandar Municipal Corporation
- Founded: 1 March 2006
- Headquarters: Bhayandar
- Locale: Mira-Bhayandar Mumbai Metropolitan area
- Service area: Mira Road; Bhayandar; Thane; Mumbai; Bhiwandi
- Service type: local, limited bus
- Operator: Mira-Bhayandar Municipal Transport Undertaking
- Website: www.mbmc.gov.in

The Mira-Bhayandar Municipal Transport (MBMT) is a public transport service owned by the Mira-Bhayandar Municipal Corporation (MBMC), which began operations in 2006 as a local bus services connecting various places in the Mira-Bhayandar area. Presently, these buses are run by a private company Kestrel Infrastructure Pvt. Ltd. Kestrel will pay a royalty of Re 1 per kilometer to the MBMT.

Presently MBMT operates in Mira-Bhayander, Thane, Borivali, Uttan and Andheri. Its fleet consists of non-AC TATA Marcopolo CNG buses, non-AC Eka Electric buses and a handful of Volvo AC buses.

== MBMT Bus Routes ==
The following is a list of the limited bus routes operated by MBMT in Mumbai.

Route Number	Origin	Destination	Notes
1	Bhayandar Rly Stn (W)	Chowk Garden	
2	Bhayandar Rly Stn (W)	Uttan Naka	
3	Bhayandar Rly Stn (W)	Manori Tar	
4	Bhayandar Rly Stn (W)	Pagoda	
5-Ring	Bhayandar Rly Stn (W)	Bhayandar Rly Stn (W)	Via Maxus Mall
6	Uttan Naka	Manori Tar	
7	Maxus Mall	Andheri Rly Stn (E)	
7 AC	Maxus Mall	Andheri Rly Stn (E)	
8	Gorai Khadi	Chowk Garden	
9	Chowk Dhakka Jetty	Velkani Bhatebunder	
10	Bhayandar Rly Stn (W)	Thane Rly Stn (E)	
10 AC	Bhayandar Rly Stn (W)	Thane Rly Stn (E)	
12	Bhayandar Rly Stn (E)	Ramdev Park	
14	Bhayandar Rly Stn (E)	Borivali Rly Stn (E)	
15	Rashmi Complex / Ghodbunder Depot	Mira Road Rly Stn (E)	
16	Unique Garden / Tiwari College	Mira Road Rly Stn (E)	
17	Vinay Nagar	Mira Road Rly Stn (E)	
18	Jogeshwari Rly Stn	Western Park	
19	JP North	Mira Road Rly Stn (E)	
21	KD Empire	Mira Road Rly Sn (E)	
22	Ghodbunder Village	Mira Road Rly Stn (E)	Via GCC, Silver Park, Shanti Nagar
23	Bhayandar Rly Stn (E)	Penkarpada	Via Mira Road Rly Stn (E)
24	Western Park	Mira Road Rly Stn (E)	Via MTNL Road
25	Kashimira Junction	Mira Road Rly Stn (E)	Via Shanti Nagar
26	Bhayandar Rly Stn (E)	Royal College	Via Mira Road Rly Stn (E)
28	Bhayandar Rly Stn (E)	Mira Road Rly Stn (E)	
29	Thane Rly Stn (E)	Mira Road Rly Stn (E)	Via Kashimira and SK Stone
29 AC	Thane Ry Stn (E)	Mira Road Rly Stn (E)	Via Kashimira and SK Stone

== See also ==
- BEST
- KDMT
- NMMT
- TMT
- VVMT
