= Kalyan-Dombivli Municipal Transport =

KDMT Bus Service
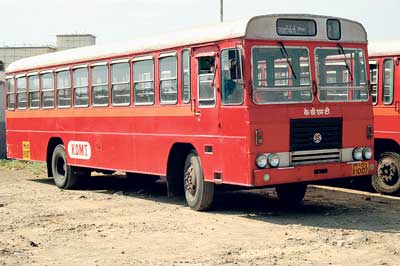
- An Old KDMT bus, currently not in use
- Parent: Kalyan-Dombivli Municipal Corporation
- Founded: 1 May 1997
- Headquarters: Kalyan, Maharashtra, India
- Locale: Kalyan-Dombivli Mumbai Metropolitan Region
- Service area: Kalyan; Dombivli; Navi Mumbai; Panvel; Titwala; Bhiwandi; Thane; Ulhasnagar
- Service type: Local, Limited bus
- Operator: Kalyan-Dombivli Municipal Transport Undertaking
- General Manager: Mr. Devidas Tekale

Kalyan-Dombivli Municipal Transport (KDMT) is a public transport company operating in India, run by the Kalyan-Dombivli Municipal Corporation.

It is run by the municipal corporation of Kalyan and Dombivli. With its head office located opposite KDMC, the organization runs daily bus services from two branches for the welfare of the people of Kalyan and Dombivli, as well as nearby towns, cities, and villages. It has 218 buses with over 50 being operational.

In October 2022, KDMT introduced 100 German made ebuses. Integrated Transit Management System (ITMS) was also introduced in 2022. In October 2025, a common app integrating all transport operators was launched.

== See also ==
- Transportation in Thane
- BEST
- MBMT
- NMMT
- TMT
- VVMT
