= List of Mumbai Metro stations =

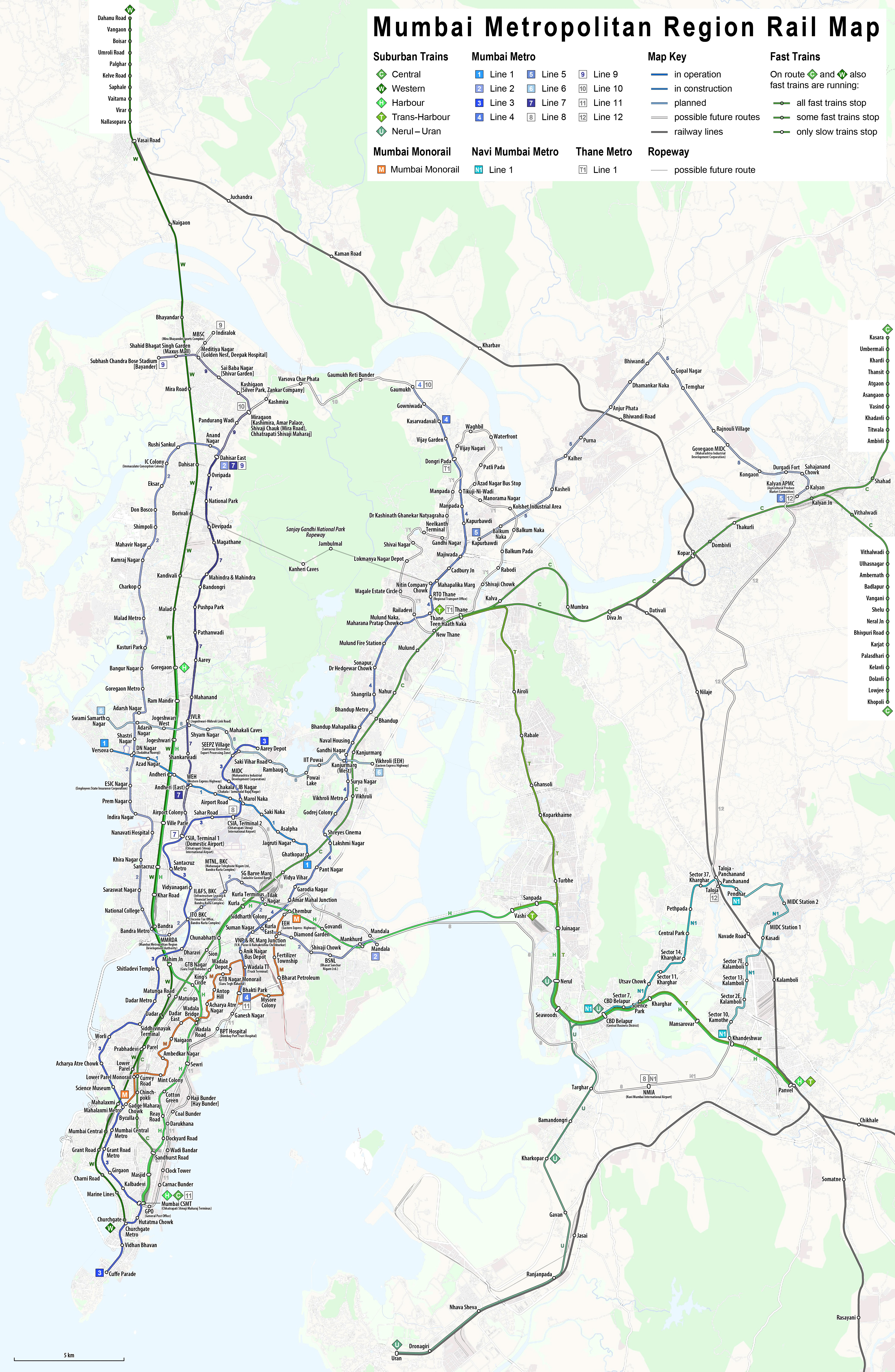
Topological map of Mumbai's public transport system

This is a list of all stations of the Mumbai Metro, a rapid transit system serving Mumbai in the Mumbai Metropolitan Region, India. The Mumbai Metro is the fifth transit system to be built in India. The first line of the Mumbai Metro was opened on 8 June 2014 with Blue Line 1, with the current total number of 77 stations operating as of August 2026.

Currently, the expansion of the Mumbai Metro network is going to be around 200 km (120 mi). This expansion will allow Mumbai to connect with its satellite cities that lay in the Mumbai Metropolitan Region.

Each line of the Mumbai Metro is identified by a specific color. The system uses rolling stocks of standard gauge trains and has a combination of elevated, underground and at-grade lines.

== Metro stations ==
†	Terminal station
*	Transfer station
†*	Terminal and transfer station to other lines
††	Transfer station to Mumbai Suburban Railway and Mumbai Monorail
**	Transfer station to other lines and Mumbai Suburban Railway and Mumbai Monorail
#*	Terminal and transfer station to Mumbai Suburban Railway, Mumbai Monorail and Indian Railways
†¤	Terminal, transfer station to other lines, Mumbai Suburban Railway, Mumbai Monorail and Indian Railways

=== Operational ===
Station name		Line	Layout	Platform layout	Status	Notes	Ref.
English	Marathi	Line	Layout	Platform layout	Status	Notes	Ref.
Aarey	आरे	Line 7	Elevated	Side	Operational from 2 April 2022		
Aarey JVLR†*	आरे जे.व्ही.एल.आर.	Line 3	At-grade	Side	Operational from 5 October 2024	Interchange with Line 6 on SEEPZ Village	
Acharya Atre Chowk	आचार्य अत्रे चौक	Line 3	Underground	Island	Operational from 9 May 2025		
Airport Road	विमानतळ रस्ता	Line 1	Elevated	Side	Operational from 8 June 2014		
Akurli	आकुर्ली	Line 7	Elevated	Side	Operational from 2 April 2022		
Anand Nagar	आनंद नगर	Line 2A	Elevated	Side	Operational from 2 April 2022		
Andheri West*	अंधेरी (पश्चिम)	Line 2A	Elevated	Side	Operational from 19 January 2023	Interchange with Line 1 on D N Nagar	
Andheri††	अंधेरी	Line 1	Elevated	Side	Operational from 8 June 2014	Transfer station to Andheri railway station	
Asalpha	असल्फा	Line 1	Elevated	Side	Operational from 8 June 2014		
Azad Nagar	आझाद नगर	Line 1	Elevated	Side	Operational from 8 June 2014		
Bandra Colony	वांद्रे वसाहत	Line 3	Underground	Island	Operational from 5 October 2024		
Bandra Kurla Complex*	वांद्रे कुर्ला संकुल	Line 3	Underground	Island	Operational from 5 October 2024	Interchange with Line 2B on Income Tax Office	
Bangur Nagar	बांगुर नगर	Line 2A	Elevated	Side	Operational from 19 January 2023		
Borivali West	बोरीवली (पश्चिम)	Line 2A	Elevated	Side	Operational from 2 April 2022		
Chakala (J. B. Nagar)	चकाला (जे.बी. नगर)	Line 1	Elevated	Side	Operational from 8 June 2014		
Chembur††	चेंबूर	Line 2B	Elevated	Side	Operational from 13 August 2026	Transfer station to VNP and RC Marg Junction monorail station	
Chhatrapati Shivaji Maharaj Chowk (Chembur)	छत्रपती शिवाजी महाराज चौक (चेंबूर)	Line 2B	Elevated	Side	Operational from 8 April 2026		
Chhatrapati Shivaji Maharaj International Airport - T1	छत्रपती शिवाजी महाराज आंतरराष्ट्रीय विमानतळ - टी१	Line 3	Underground	Island	Operational from 5 October 2024		
Chhatrapati Shivaji Maharaj International Airport - T2†*	छत्रपती शिवाजी महाराज आंतरराष्ट्रीय विमानतळ - टी२	Line 3 Line 7 Line 8	Underground	Side and island	Operational from 5 October 2024; under construction		
Chhatrapati Shivaji Maharaj Terminus†¤	छत्रपती शिवाजी महाराज टर्मिनस	Line 3 Line 11	Underground	Side and island	Operational from 9 October 2025; under construction	Transfer station to Chhatrapati Shivaji Maharaj Terminus	
Churchgate††	चर्चगेट	Line 3	Underground	Island	Operational from 9 October 2025	Transfer station to Churchgate railway station	
Cuffe Parade†	कफ परेड	Line 3	Underground	Island	Operational from 9 October 2025		
D N Nagar*	डी.एन. नगर	Line 1	Elevated	Side	Operational from 8 June 2014	Interchange with Line 2A on Andheri West	
Dadar	दादर	Line 3	Underground	Island	Operational from 9 May 2025		
Dahanukarwadi	डहाणूकरवाडी	Line 2A	Elevated	Side	Operational from 2 April 2022		
Dahisar East†*	दहिसर (पूर्व)	Line 2A; Line 9	Elevated	Side and island	Operational from 2 April 2022; operational from 8 April 2026		
Deonar	देवनार	Line 2B	Elevated	Side	Operational from 8 April 2026		
Deshbhakt N.G. Acharya Udyan-Diamond Garden, Chembur	देशभक्त ना.ग. आचार्य उद्यान-डायमंड गार्डन, चेंबूर	Line 2B	Elevated	Side	Operational from 8 April 2026		
Devipada	देवीपाडा	Line 7	Elevated	Side	Operational from 2 April 2022		
Dharavi	धारावी	Line 3	Underground	Island	Operational from 9 May 2025		
Dindoshi	दिंडोशी	Line 7	Elevated	Side	Operational from 2 April 2022		
Eksar	एकसर	Line 2A	Elevated	Side	Operational from 2 April 2022		
Ghatkopar#*	घाटकोपर	Line 1	Elevated	Island	Operational from 8 June 2014	Transfer station to Ghatkopar railway station	
Girgaon	गिरगाव	Line 3	Underground	Island	Operational from 9 October 2025		
Goregaon East	गोरेगाव (पूर्व)	Line 7	Elevated	Side	Operational from 19 January 2023		
Goregaon West	गोरेगाव (पश्चिम)	Line 2A	Elevated	Side	Operational from 19 January 2023		
Grant Road††	ग्रँट रोड	Line 3	Underground	Island	Operational from 9 October 2025	Transfer station to Grant Road railway station	
Gundavali*	गुंदवली	Line 7	Elevated	Side	Operational from 19 January 2023	Interchange with Line 1 on Western Express Highway	
Hutatma Chowk	हुतात्मा चौक	Line 3	Underground	Island	Operational from 9 October 2025		
Jagannath Shankar Sheth††	जगन्नाथ शंकरशेठ	Line 3	Underground	Island	Operational from 9 October 2025	Transfer station to Mumbai Central railway station	
Jagruti Nagar	जागृती नगर	Line 1	Elevated	Side	Operational from 8 June 2014		
Jogeshwari East	जोगेश्वरी (पूर्व)	Line 7	Elevated	Side	Operational from 19 January 2023	Interchange with Line 6 on JVLR Junction	
Kalbadevi	काळबादेवी	Line 3	Underground	Island	Operational from 9 October 2025		
Kandarpada	कांदरपाडा	Line 2A	Elevated	Side	Operational from 2 April 2022		
Kandivli West	कांदिवली (पश्चिम)	Line 2A	Elevated	Side	Operational from 2 April 2022		
Kashigaon	काशिगाव	Line 9	Elevated	Side	Operational from 8 April 2026		
Kurar	कुरार	Line 7	Elevated	Side	Operational from 2 April 2022		
Lower Malad	लोअर मालाड	Line 2A	Elevated	Side	Operational from 19 January 2023		
Lower Oshiwara*	लोअर ओशिवरा	Line 2A	Elevated	Side	Operational from 19 January 2023	Interchange with Line 6 on Adarsh Nagar (Mumbai)	
Magathane	मागाठाणे	Line 7	Elevated	Side	Operational from 2 April 2022		
Mahalaxmi††	महालक्ष्मी	Line 3	Underground	Island	Operational from 9 October 2025	Transfer station to Mahalaxmi railway station and Sant Gadge Maharaj Chowk monorail station	
Maharashtranagar Mandale†	महाराष्ट्रनगर मंडाळे	Line 2B	Elevated	Side	Operational from 8 April 2026		
Malad West	मालाड (पश्चिम)	Line 2A	Elevated	Side	Operational from 19 January 2023		
Mandapeshwar	मंडपेश्वर	Line 2A	Elevated	Side	Operational from 2 April 2022		
Mankhurd**	मानखुर्द	Line 2B; Line 8	Elevated	Side and island	Operational from 8 April 2026; under construction	Transfer station to Mankhurd railway station	
Marol Naka*	मरोळ नाका	Line 1 Line 3	Elevated; underground	Side and island	Operational from 8 June 2014; operational from 5 October 2024		
MIDC – Andheri	एम.आय.डी.सी. – अंधेरी	Line 3	Underground	Island	Operational from 5 October 2024		
Miragaon*	मिरागाव	Line 9	Elevated	Side	Operational from 8 April 2026	Interchange with Line 10 on Shivaji Chowk (Mira Road)	
Mogra	मोगरा	Line 7	Elevated	Side	Operational from 19 January 2023		
Oshiwara	ओशिवरा	Line 2A	Elevated	Side	Operational from 19 January 2023		
Ovaripada	ओवरीपाडा	Line 7	Elevated	Side	Operational from 2 April 2022		
Pandurang Wadi	पांडुरंग वाडी	Line 9	Elevated	Side	Operational from 8 April 2026		
Poisar	पोईसर	Line 7	Elevated	Side	Operational from 2 April 2022		
Rashtriya Udyan	राष्ट्रीय उद्यान	Line 7	Elevated	Side	Operational from 2 April 2022		
Sahar Road	सहार रोड	Line 3	Underground	Island	Operational from 5 October 2024		
Saki Naka	साकी नाका	Line 1	Elevated	Side	Operational from 8 June 2014		
Santacruz††	सांताक्रुझ	Line 3	Underground	Island	Operational from 5 October 2024	Transfer station to Santacruz railway station	
Science Centre	विज्ञान केंद्र	Line 3	Underground	Island	Operational from 9 October 2025		
SEEPZ*	सीप्झ	Line 3	Underground	Island	Operational from 5 October 2024		
Shimpoli	शिंपोली	Line 2A	Elevated	Side	Operational from 2 April 2022		
Shitaladevi Mandir	शितलादेवी मंदिर	Line 3	Underground	Island	Operational from 9 May 2025		
Siddhivinayak	सिद्धिविनायक	Line 3	Underground	Island	Operational from 9 May 2025		
Valnai–Meeth Chowky	वळनई–मीठ चौकी	Line 2A	Elevated	Side	Operational from 19 January 2023		
Versova†	वर्सोवा	Line 1	Elevated	Side	Operational from 8 June 2014		
Vidhan Bhavan	विधान भवन	Line 3	Underground	Island	Operational from 9 October 2025		
Western Express Highway*	पश्चिम द्रुतगती महामार्ग	Line 1	Elevated	Side	Operational from 8 June 2014	Interchange with Line 7 on Gundavali	
Worli	वरळी	Line 3	Underground	Island	Operational from 9 May 2025		

=== Under construction ===
Station name		Line	Layout	Platform layout	Status	Notes	Refs
English	Marathi	Line	Layout	Platform layout	Status	Notes	Refs
Adarsh Nagar (Mumbai)*	आदर्श नगर (मुंबई)	Line 6	Elevated	Side	Under construction	Interchange with Line 2A on Lower Oshiwara	
Airport Colony	विमानतळ वसाहत	Line 7	Elevated	Side	Under construction	–	
Amar Mahal Junction	अमर महल जंक्शन	Line 4	Elevated	Side	Under construction	–	
Anik Nagar Bus Depot†	आणिक नगर बस डेपो	Line 11	At-grade	Side	Under construction	–	
Anjur Phata	अंजूर फाटा	Line 5	Elevated	Side	Under construction	–	
Apollo	अपोलो	Line 8	Elevated	Side	Under construction	–	
Baiganwadi	बैगनवाडी	Line 8	Elevated	Side	Under construction	–	
Bale	बाळे	Line 12	Elevated	Side	Under construction	–	
Balkum Naka	बाळकुम नाका	Line 5	Elevated	Side	Under construction	–	
Bandra††	वांद्रे	Line 2B	Elevated	Side	Under construction	Transfer station to Bandra railway station	
Bhandup††	भांडुप	Line 4	Elevated	Side	Under construction	Transfer station to Bhandup railway station	
Bhandup Mahapalika	भांडुप महापालिका	Line 4	Elevated	Side	Under construction	–	
Bhendi Bazaar	भेंडी बाजार	Line 11	Underground	Island	Under construction	–	
Bhiwandi	भिवंडी	Line 5	Elevated	Side	Under construction	–	
BPT Hospital	बी.पी.टी. रुग्णालय	Line 11	Underground	Island	Under construction	–	
Byculla††	भायखळा	Line 11	Underground	Island	Under construction	Transfer station to Byculla railway station	
Cadbury Junction	कॅडबरी जंक्शन	Line 4	Elevated	Side	Under construction	–	
CGS Colony††	सी.जी.एस. कॉलनी	Line 11	Underground	Island	Under construction	Transfer station to Bhakti Park monorail station	
Coal Bunder	कोळसा बंदर	Line 11	Underground	Island	Under construction	–	
Crawford Market	क्रॉफर्ड मार्केट	Line 11	Underground	Island	Under construction	–	
Dhamankar Naka	धामणकर नाका	Line 5	Elevated	Side	Under construction	–	
Dombivali MIDC	डोंबिवली एमआयडीसी	Line 12	Elevated	Side	Under construction	–	
Dongripada	डोंगरीपाडा	Line 4	Elevated	Side	Under construction	–	
Durgadi Fort	दुर्गाडी किल्ला	Line 5	Elevated	Side	Under construction	–	
Eastern Express Highway	पूर्व द्रुतगती महामार्ग	Line 2B	Elevated	Side	Under construction	–	
ESIC Nagar	ई.एस.आय.सी. नगर	Line 2B	Elevated	Side	Under construction	–	
Gaimukh†	गायमुख	Line 4	Elevated	Side	Under construction	–	
Gaimukh Reti Bandar	गायमुख रेतीबंदर	Line 10	Elevated	Side	Under construction	–	
Gandhi Nagar (Kanjurmarg)**	गांधी नगर	Line 4	Elevated	Side	Under construction	Interchange with Line 6 on Kanjurmarg (West) and Transfer station to Kanjur Marg railway station	
Ganesh Nagar (Kalyan)	गणेश नगर (कल्याण)	Line 12	Elevated	Side	Under construction	–	
Ganesh Nagar (Wadala)	गणेश नगर (वडाळा)	Line 11	Underground	Island	Under construction	–	
Garodia Nagar*	गरोडिया नगर	Line 4 Line 8	Elevated; underground	Side and island	Under construction	–	
Godrej Company	गोदरेज वसाहत	Line 4	Elevated	Side	Under construction	–	
Golavali	गोळवली	Line 12	Elevated	Side	Under construction	–	
Gopal Nagar	गोपाळ नगर	Line 5	Elevated	Side	Under construction	–	
Govegaon MIDC	गोवेगाव एम.आय.डी.सी.	Line 5	Elevated	Side	Under construction	–	
Gowniwada	गोवनीवाडा	Line 4	Elevated	Side	Under construction	–	
Hay Bunder	हे बंदर	Line 11	Underground	Island	Under construction	–	
Hedutane	हेदुटणे	Line 12	Elevated	Side	Under construction	–	
Horniman Circle	हॉर्निमन सर्कल	Line 11	Underground	Island	Under construction	–	
IIT Powai	आय.आय.टी. पवई	Line 6	Elevated	Side	Under construction	–	
ILFS	आय.एल. आणि एफ.एस.	Line 2B	Elevated	Side	Under construction	–	
Income Tax Office*	आयकर कार्यालय	Line 2B	Elevated	Side	Under construction	Interchange with Line 3 on Bandra Kurla Complex	
Indira Nagar (Vile Parle)	इंदिरा नगर	Line 2B	Elevated	Side	Under construction	–	
ISBT	आय.एस.बी.टी.	Line 8	Elevated	Side	Under construction	–	
Jogeshwari (West)††	जोगेश्वरी (पश्चिम)	Line 6	Elevated	Side	Under construction	Transfer station to Jogeshwari railway station	
Juinagar††	जुईनगर	Line 8	Elevated	Side	Under construction	Transfer station to Juinagar railway station	
JVLR Junction*	जे.व्ही.एल.आर.	Line 6	Elevated	Side	Under construction	Interchange with Line 7 on Jogeshwari East	
Kalher	काल्हेर	Line 5	Elevated	Side	Under construction	–	
Kalyan APMC	कल्याण ए.पी.एम.सी.	Line 12	Elevated	Side	Under construction	–	
Kalyan Railway Station#*	कल्याण रेल्वे स्थानक	Line 12	Elevated	Side	Under construction	Transfer station to Kalyan Junction railway station	
Kanjurmarg (West)**	कांजुर मार्ग	Line 6	Elevated	Side	Under construction	Interchange with Line 4 on Gandhi Nagar (Kanjurmarg) and Transfer station to Kanjur Marg railway station	
Kapurbawdi†*	कापूरबावडी	Line 4 Line 5	Elevated	Side and island	Under construction	–	
Kasarvadavali	कासारवडवली	Line 4	Elevated	Side	Under construction	–	
Kasheli	कशेळी	Line 5	Elevated	Side	Under construction	–	
Kashimira	काशिमिरा	Line 10	Elevated	Side	Under construction	–	
Khira Nagar	खिरा नगर	Line 2B	Elevated	Side	Under construction	–	
Kolegaon	कोळेगाव	Line 12	Elevated	Side	Under construction	–	
Kongaon	कोनगाव	Line 5	Elevated	Side	Under construction	–	
Kurla††	कुर्ला	Line 8	Underground	Island	Under construction	Transfer station to Kurla railway station	
Kurla (East)	कुर्ला (पूर्व)	Line 2B	Elevated	Side	Under construction	–	
Laxmi Nagar (Ghatkopar)	लक्ष्मी नगर	Line 4	Elevated	Side	Under construction	–	
Lokmanya Tilak Terminus††	लोकमान्य टिळक टर्मिनस	Line 8	Underground	Island	Under construction	Transfer station to Lokmanya Tilak Terminus	
LP	एल.पी.	Line 8	Elevated	Side	Under construction	–	
Mahakali Caves	महाकाली गुहा	Line 6	Elevated	Side	Under construction	–	
Mahapalika Marg	महापालिका मार्ग	Line 4	Elevated	Side	Under construction	–	
Majiwada	माजिवडा	Line 4	Elevated	Side	Under construction	–	
Manpada (Dombivali East)	मानपाडा (डोंबिवली)	Line 12	Elevated	Side	Under construction	–	
Manpada (Thane)	मानपाडा (ठाणे)	Line 4	Elevated	Side	Under construction	–	
Deepak Hospital (Medtiya Nagar)	मेडतिया नगर	Line 9	Elevated	Side	Under construction	–	
MTNL	एम.टी.एन.एल.	Line 2B	Elevated	Side	Under construction	–	
Mulund Fire Station	मुलुंड अग्निशमन केंद्र	Line 4	Elevated	Side	Under construction	–	
Mulund Naka	मुलुंड नाका	Line 4	Elevated	Side	Under construction	–	
Nagpada Junction	नागपाडा जंक्शन	Line 11	Underground	Island	Under construction	–	
Nanavati Hospital	नानावटी रुग्णालय	Line 2B	Elevated	Side	Under construction	–	
Navi Mumbai International Airport West	नवी मुंबई आंतरराष्ट्रीय विमानतळ पश्चिम	Line 8	Elevated	Side	Under construction	–	
Navi Mumbai International Airport Terminal 2†	नवी मुंबई आंतरराष्ट्रीय विमानतळ टर्मिनल २	Line 8	Elevated	Side	Under construction	–	
National College (Bandra)	राष्ट्रीय महाविद्यालय	Line 2B	Elevated	Side	Under construction	–	
Naval Housing	नौदल गृहनिर्माण	Line 4	Elevated	Side	Under construction	–	
Nerul††	नेरूळ	Line 8	Elevated	Side	Under construction	Transfer station to Nerul railway station	
Nilaje Gaon	निळजे गाव	Line 12	Elevated	Side	Under construction	–	
Pant Nagar	पंत नगर	Line 4	Elevated	Side	Under construction	–	
Phoenix Mall	फिनिक्स मॉल	Line 8	Underground	Island	Under construction	–	
Pisarve	पिसार्वे	Line 12	Elevated	Side	Under construction	–	
Pisarve Depot	पिसार्वे डेपो	Line 12	Elevated	Side	Under construction	–	
Pisavali Gaon	पिसवली गाव	Line 12	Elevated	Side	Under construction	–	
Powai Lake	पवई तलाव	Line 6	Elevated	Side	Under construction	–	
Prem Nagar	प्रेम नगर	Line 2B	Elevated	Side	Under construction	–	
Purna	पूर्णा	Line 5	Elevated	Side	Under construction	–	
Rajnouli Village	रांजणोली	Line 5	Elevated	Side	Under construction	–	
Rambaug (Powai)	रामबाग	Line 6	Elevated	Side	Under construction	–	
Reay Road††	रे रोड	Line 11	Underground	Island	Under construction	Transfer station to Reay Road railway station	
RTO Thane	आर.टी.ओ. ठाणे	Line 4	Elevated	Side	Under construction	–	
SG Barve Marg*	एस.जी. बर्वे मार्ग	Line 2B; Line 8	Elevated; underground	Side and island	Under construction	–	
Sagaon	सागाव	Line 12	Elevated	Side	Under construction	–	
Sagar Sangam	सागरसंगम	Line 8	Elevated	Side	Under construction	–	
Sahajanand Chowk	सहजानंद चौक	Line 5	Elevated	Side	Under construction	–	
Sai Baba Nagar	साई बाबा नगर	Line 9	Elevated	Side	Under construction	–	
Saki Vihar Road	साकी विहार	Line 6	Elevated	Side	Under construction	–	
Sanpada††	सानपाडा	Line 8	Elevated	Side	Under construction	Transfer station to Sanpada railway station	
Saraswat Nagar	सारस्वत नगर	Line 2B	Elevated	Side	Under construction	–	
Seawoods††	सीवूड्स	Line 8	Elevated	Side	Under construction	Transfer station to Seawoods-Darave-Karave railway station	
SEEPZ Village*	सीप्झ गाव	Line 6	Elevated	Side	Under construction	Interchange with Line 3 on Aarey JVLR	
Sewri††	शिवडी	Line 11	Underground	Island	Under construction	Transfer station to Sewri railway station	
Shahid Bhagat Singh Garden	शहीद भगतसिंग उद्यान	Line 9	Elevated	Side	Under construction	–	
Shangrila	शांग्रीला	Line 4	Elevated	Side	Under construction	–	
Shivaji Chowk (Mira Road)†*	शिवाजी चौक (मीरा रोड)	Line 10; Line 13 (Note: Currently, The metro stations of Purple Line 13 at the DPR stage after that the number of stations should be increased.)	Elevated	Side and island	Under construction	Interchange with Line 9 on Miragaon	
Shreyas Cinema	श्रेयस सिनेमा	Line 4	Elevated	Side	Under construction	–	
Shyam Nagar (Mumbai)	श्याम नगर (मुंबई)	Line 6	Elevated	Side	Under construction	–	
Siddharth Colony	सिद्धार्थ वसाहत	Line 4	Elevated	Side	Under construction	–	
Sonapur	सोनापूर	Line 4	Elevated	Side	Under construction	–	
Sonarpada	सोनारपाडा	Line 12	Elevated	Side	Under construction	–	
SPM Circle†	एस.पी.एम. सर्कल	Line 11	Underground	Island	Under construction	–	
Subhash Chandra Bose Stadium†	सुभाषचंद्र बोस स्टेडियम	Line 9	Elevated	Side	Under construction	–	
Suman Nagar	सुमन नगर	Line 4	Elevated	Side	Under construction	–	
Surya Nagar	सूर्य नगर	Line 4	Elevated	Side	Under construction	–	
Swami Samarth Nagar (Lokhandwala)†	स्वामी समर्थ नगर	Line 6	Elevated	Side	Under construction	–	
Taloja†*	तळोजा	Line 12	Elevated	Side	Under construction	Interchange with Line 1 (Navi Mumbai Metro) on Amandoot metro station	
Targhar††	तरघर	Line 8	Elevated	Side	Under construction	Transfer station to Targhar railway station	
Teen Haath Naka (Thane)	तीन हात नाका	Line 4	Elevated	Side	Under construction	–	
Temghar	टेमघर	Line 5	Elevated	Side	Under construction	–	
Tikuji-ni-wadi	टिकुजी-नी-वाडी	Line 4	Elevated	Side	Under construction	–	
Turbhe	तुर्भे	Line 12	Elevated	Side	Under construction	–	
Vadavali	वडवली	Line 12	Elevated	Side	Under construction	–	
Varsova Char Phata	वर्सोवा चार फाटा	Line 10	Elevated	Side	Under construction	–	
Vashi††	वाशी	Line 8	Elevated	Side	Under construction	Transfer station to Vashi railway station	
Vijay Garden	विजय गार्डन	Line 4	Elevated	Side	Under construction	–	
Vikhroli EEH†*	विक्रोळी ई.इ.एच.	Line 6 Line 14 (Note: Currently, The metro stations of Magenta Line 14 are at the DPR stage after that the number of stations should be increased.)	Elevated	Side and island	Under construction	–	
Vikhroli††	विक्रोळी	Line 4	Elevated	Side	Under construction	Transfer station to Vikhroli railway station	
Waklan	वाकळण	Line 12	Elevated	Side	Under construction	–	

== Statistics ==
Total number of metro stations	207
Total number of metro stations operational	77
Total number of metro stations under construction	130
Number of interchange stations	26
Number of elevated stations	166
Number of underground stations	44
Number of at-grade stations	2

== See also ==
- List of Ahmedabad Metro stations
- List of Chennai Metro stations
- List of Coimbatore Metro stations
- List of Delhi Metro stations
- List of Hyderabad Metro stations
- List of Jaipur Metro stations
- List of Kochi Metro stations
- List of Kolkata Metro stations
- List of Lucknow Metro stations
- List of Madurai Metro stations
- List of Noida Metro stations
- List of Nagpur Metro stations
- List of Namma Metro stations
- List of Navi Mumbai Metro Stations
- List of Pune Metro stations
- List of Surat Metro stations
