= Mumbai Metropolitan Region =

Metropolitan Area in Maharashtra, India

Coordinates: 18.9667°N 72.8333°E

Mumbai Metropolitan Region Muṁbaī Mahānagara Pradēśa Greater Mumbai (MMR)
- Metropolitan area
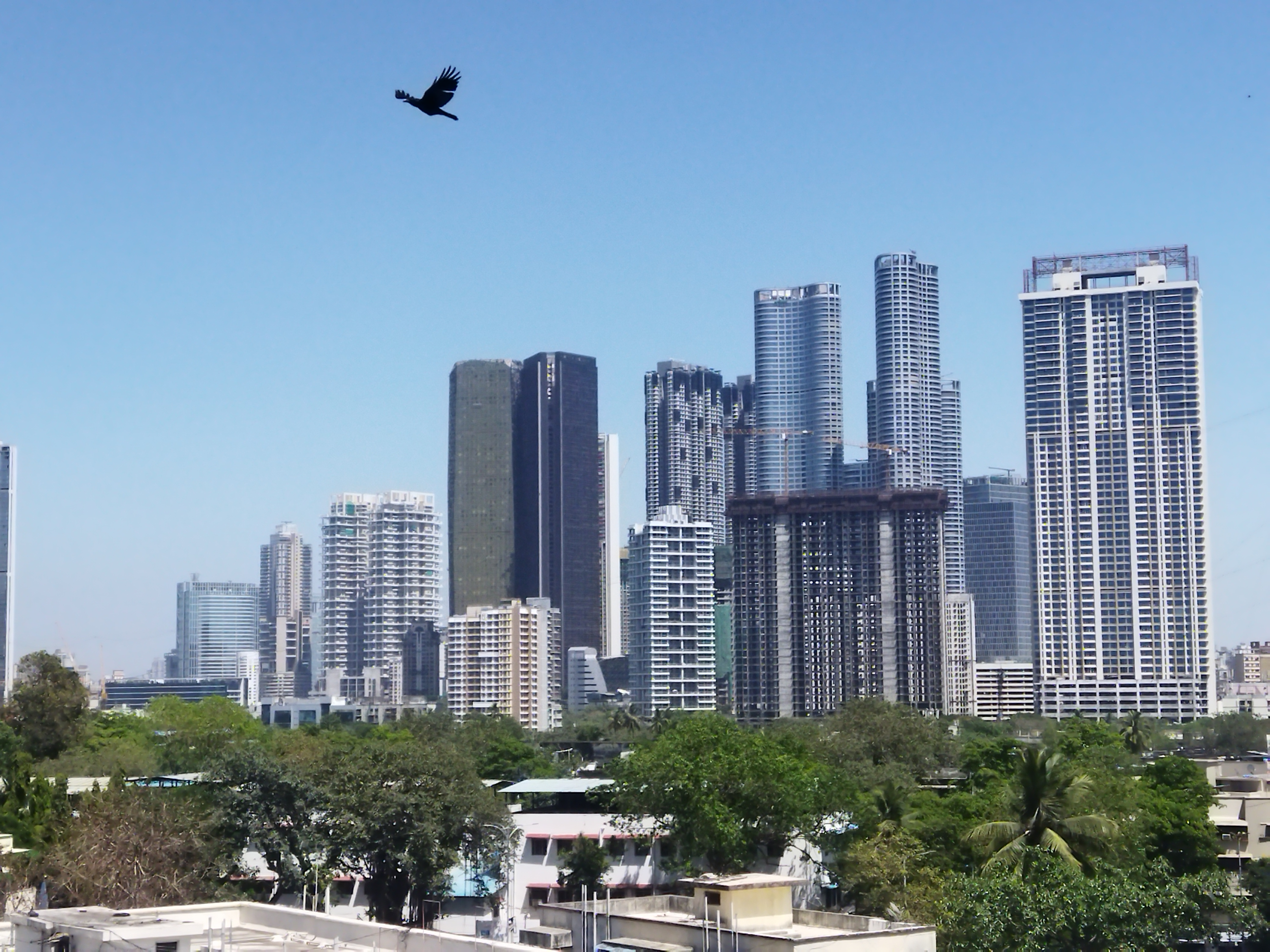
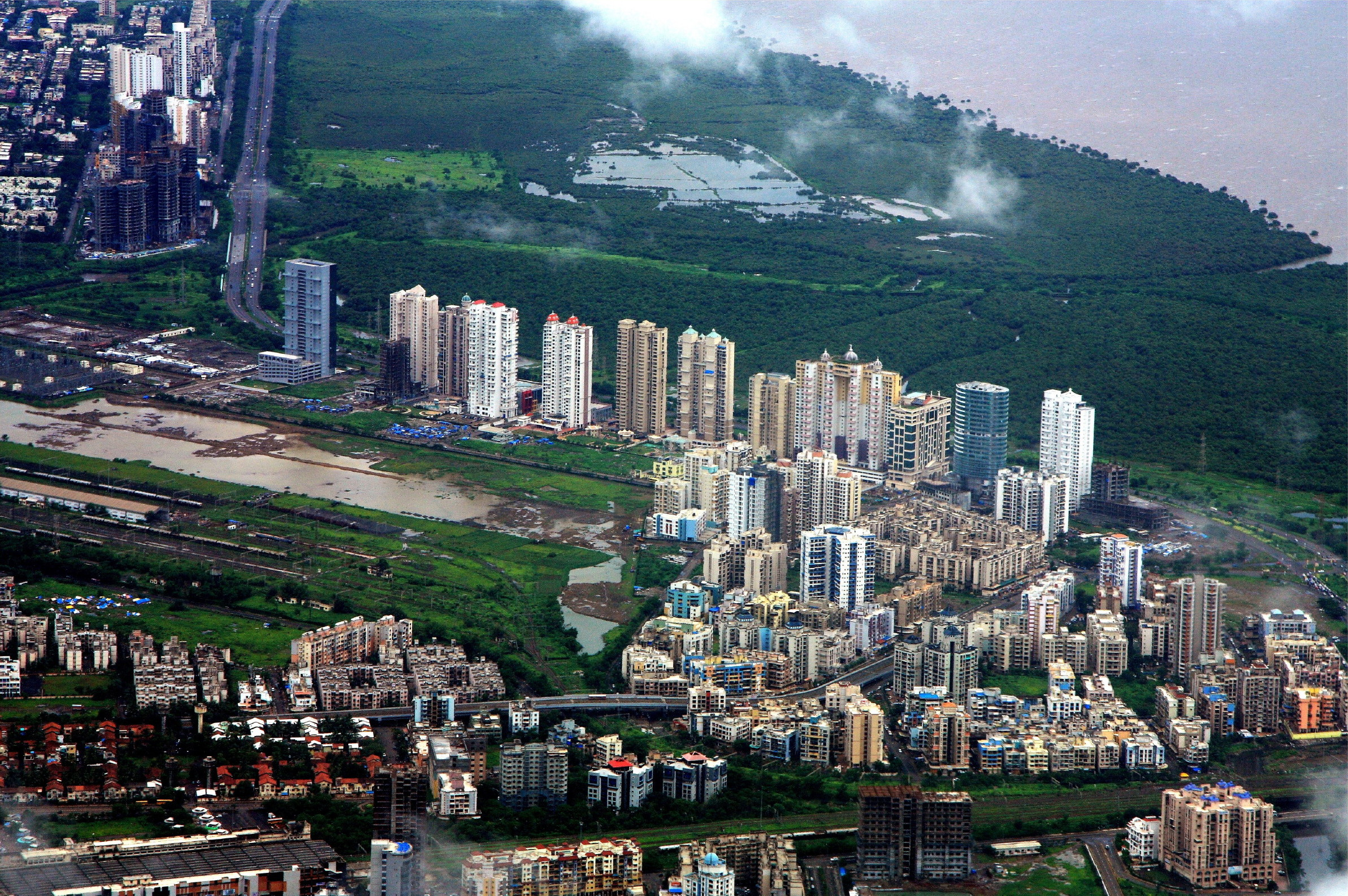
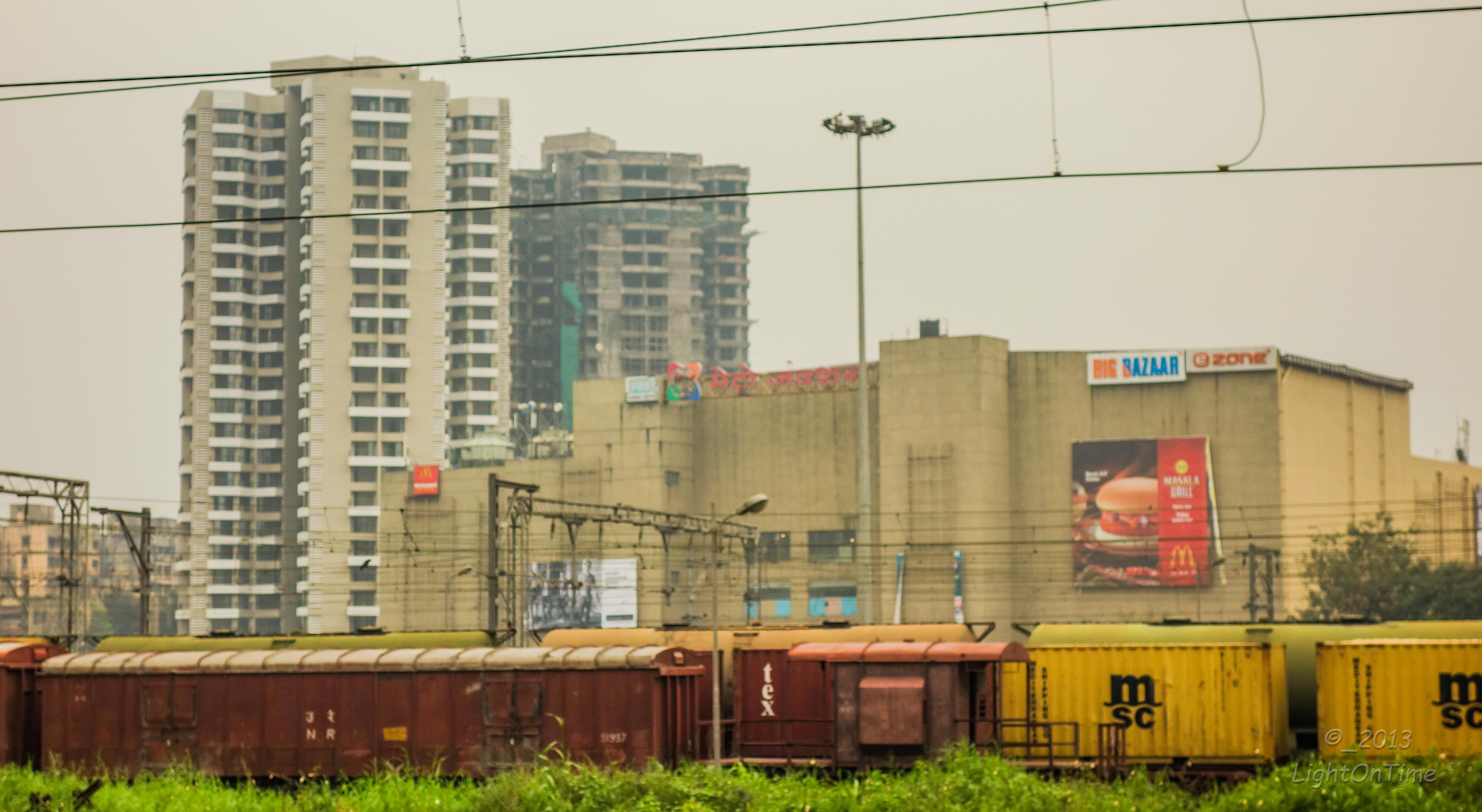
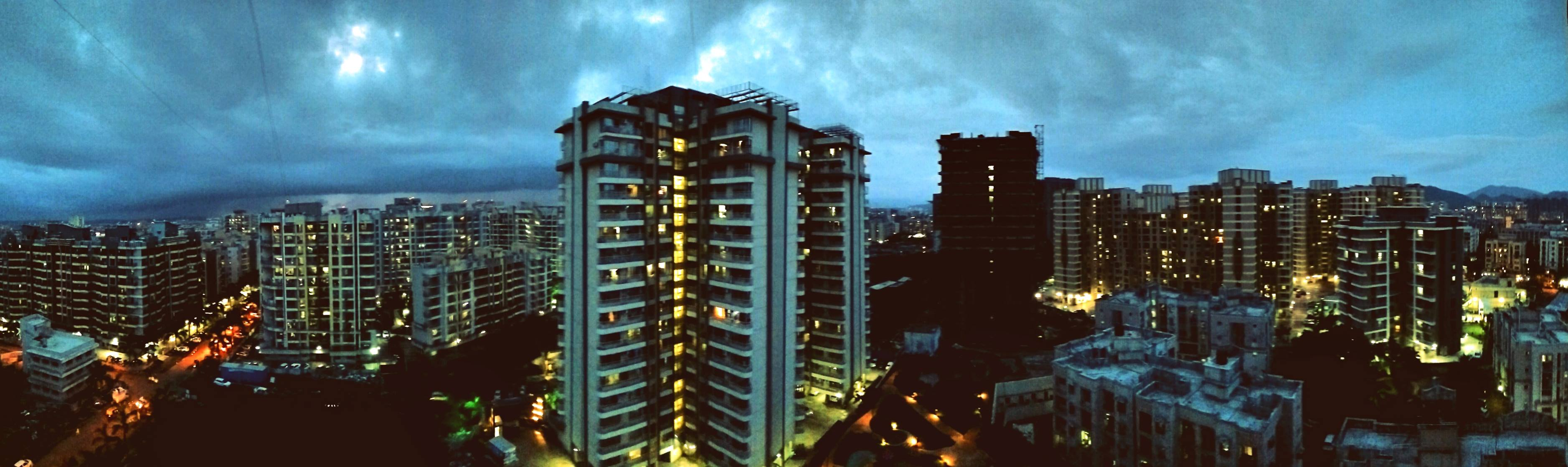
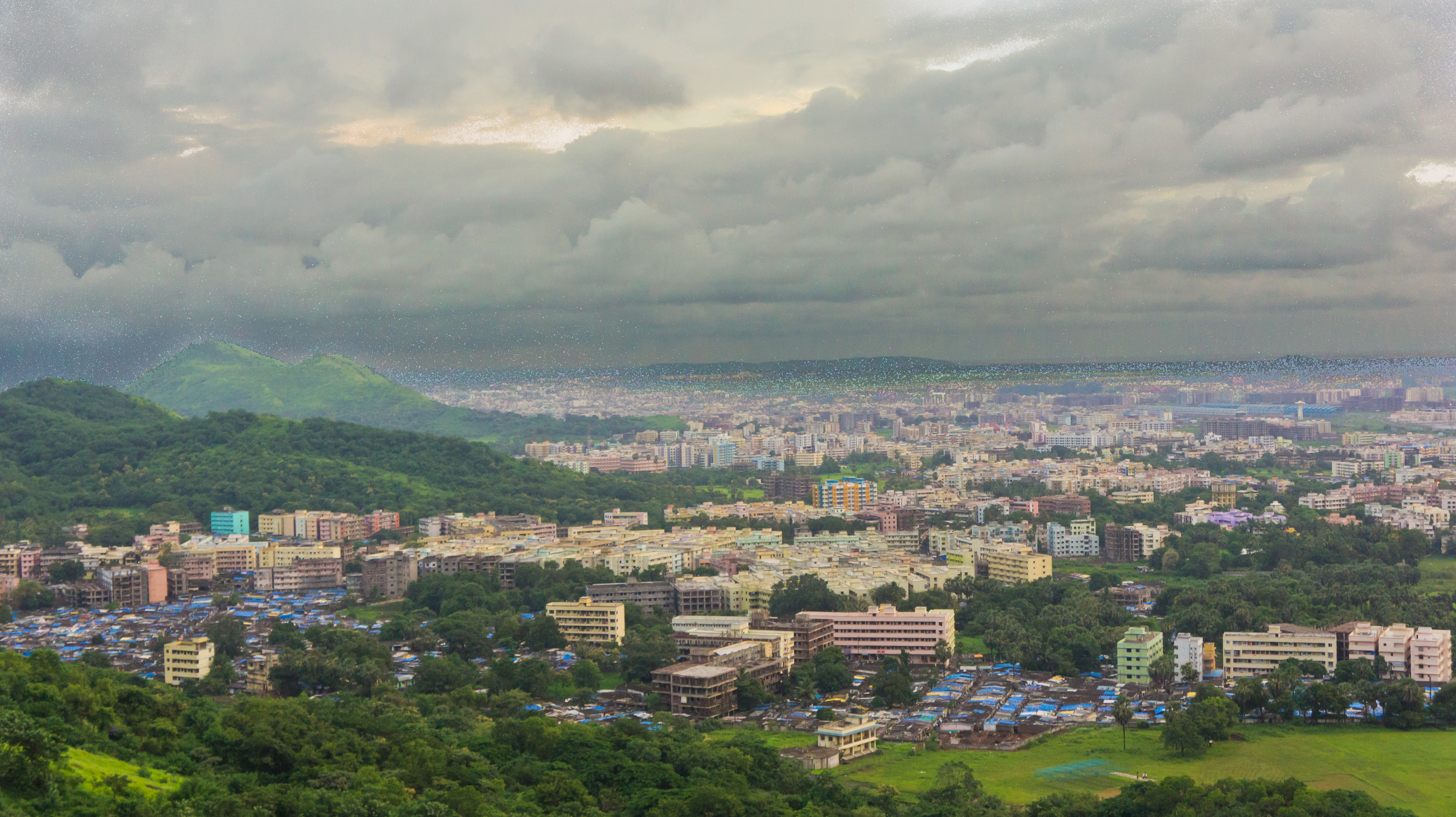
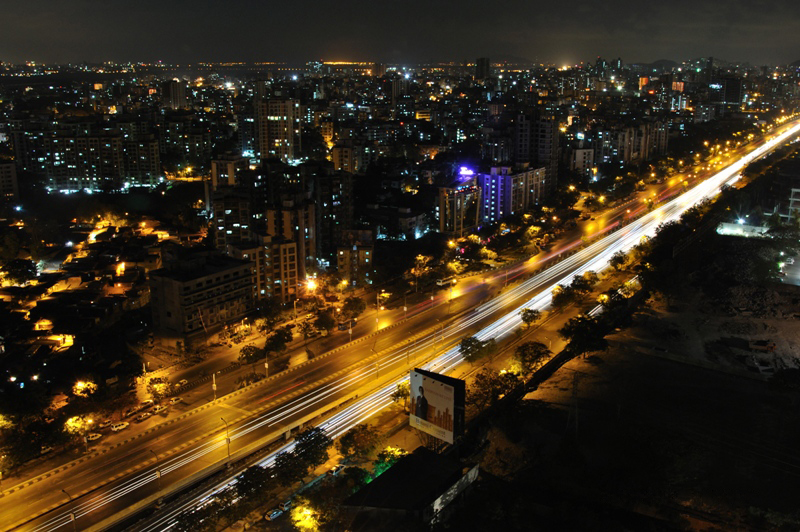
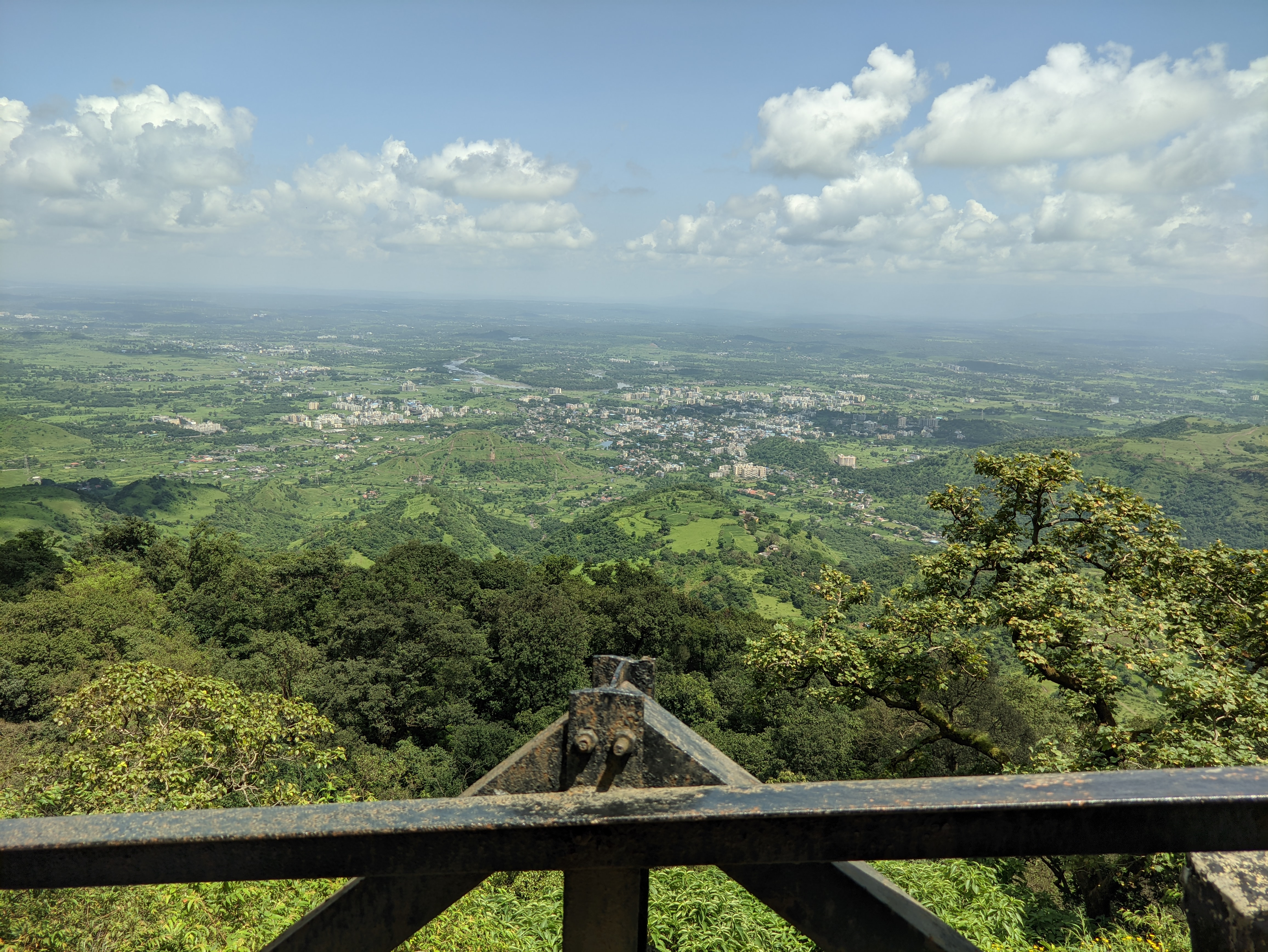
- From top, left to right: Mumbai, the centre of MMR; Navi Mumbai; Kalyan-Dombivli; Mira-Bhayandar; Vasai-Virar; Thane; View from Matheran
- Interactive map of Mumbai Metropolitan Region
- Country: India
- State: Maharashtra
- Core city: Mumbai
- Districts: Mumbai City; Mumbai Suburban; Thane; Palghar; Raigad

Government
  - Type: Urban Planning Agency
  - Body: Mumbai Metropolitan Region Development Authority

Area
  - Metro: 6,328 km^{2} (2,443 sq mi)

Population (2011)
  - Metro: 26,598,000
  - Metro density: 4,203/km^{2} (10,890/sq mi)
- Demonym(s): In Broader sense: Mumbaikar, Mumbaiite In Narrower sense: Thanekar, Navi Mumbaikar, Kalyankar, Bhiwandikar, Vasaikar, etc.

GDP
  - Metro: US$ 277.98 billion (nominal); US$ 400 billion (PPP)
- Time zone: UTC+5.30 (IST)
- PINs: 400xxx
- Website: mmrda.maharashtra.gov.in

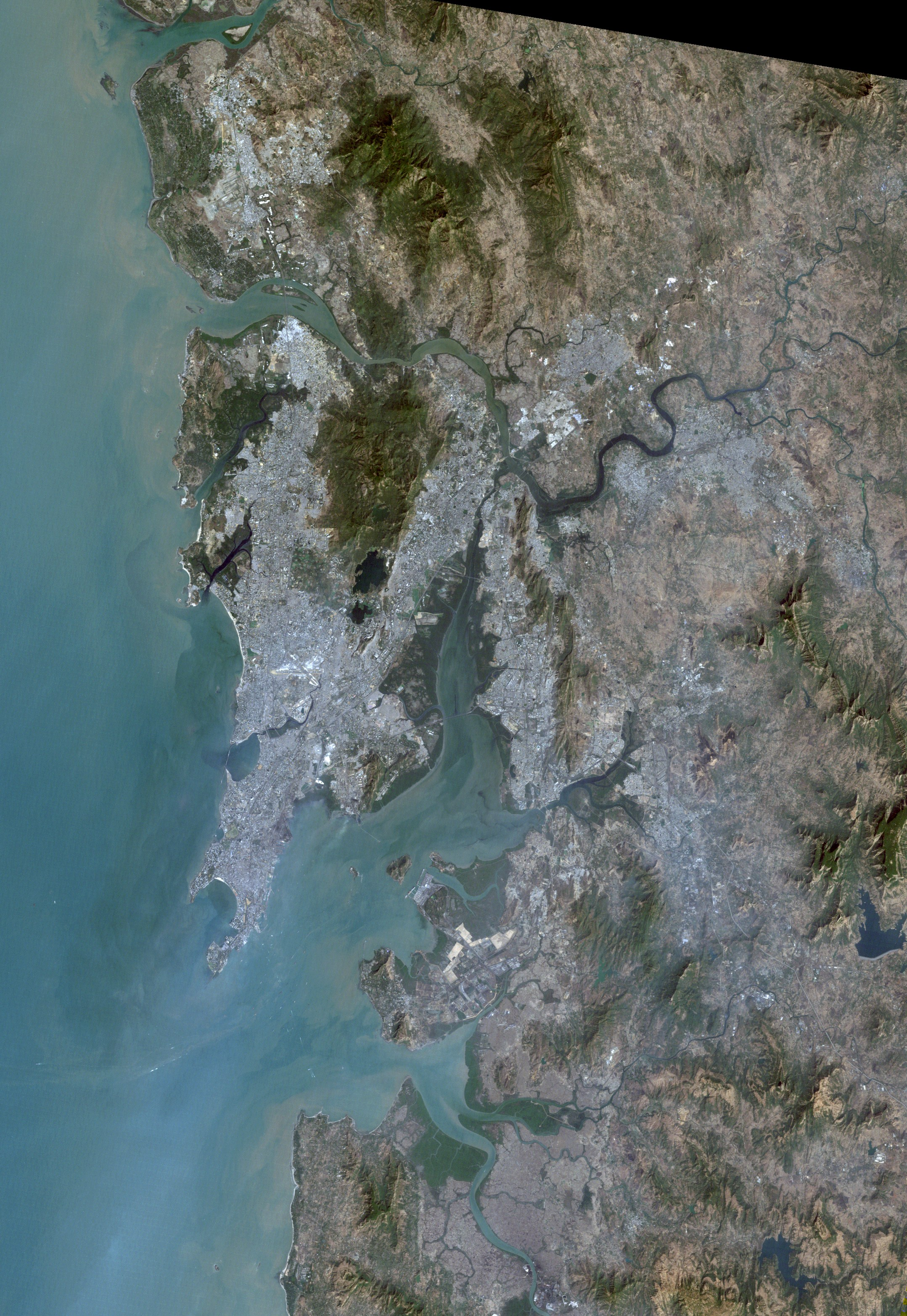
Satellite image of Mumbai metropolitan region

Mumbai Metropolitan Region (ISO: Muṁbaī Mahānagara Pradēśa; abbreviated to MMR and previously also known as Greater Bombay Metropolitan Area), is a metropolitan area consisting of Mumbai and its satellite towns on Salsette Island and in adjacent mainland areas in the northern Konkan division of Maharashtra in western India. The region has an area of 6,328 square kilometres (2,443 sq mi) and with a population of over 26 million it is among the most populous metropolitan areas in the world.

Developing over a period of about 20 years, it consists of nine municipal corporations and eight smaller municipal councils. The entire area is overseen by the Mumbai Metropolitan Region Development Authority (MMRDA), a state-owned organisation in charge of town planning, development, transportation and housing in the region.

The MMRDA was formed to address challenges in planning and development of integrated infrastructure for the metropolitan region. The areas outside Brihanmumbai (Greater Mumbai) and Navi Mumbai have lacked organised development. Navi Mumbai, developed as one of the largest planned cities in the world, was promoted by a state government-owned company, City and Industrial Development Corporation (CIDCO).

The region has had problems related to haphazard and illegal development as a result of rapid urbanisation. Villages along the NH 3 in Bhiwandi are examples of haphazard developments in the MMR, with some of the largest warehousing areas in India. Government agencies such as the Town Planner and Collector of Thane have had challenges in addressing unorganised development.

== Area ==
Municipal Bodies	Type	Districts	Area (km^{2})	Population (2011 Census)
Greater Mumbai	Corporation	Mumbai City	479	12,442,373
Greater Mumbai	Corporation	Mumbai Suburban	479	12,442,373
Bhiwandi-Nizampur	Corporation	Thane	28	709,665
Kalyan-Dombivli	Corporation	Thane	57	1,247,327
Mira-Bhayandar	Corporation	Thane	79.4	809,378
Navi Mumbai	Corporation	Thane	108.63	1,120,547
Navi Mumbai	Corporation	Raigad	108.63	1,120,547
Panvel	Corporation	Raigad	110	311,434
Thane	Corporation	Thane	128	1,841,488
Ulhasnagar	Corporation	Thane	13	506,098
Vasai-Virar	Corporation	Palghar	311	1,222,390
Ambarnath	Council	Thane	38	253,475
Badlapur	Council	Thane	38.68	174,226
Uran	Council	Raigad	17.78	23,251
Matheran	Council	Raigad	5.14	5,139
Karjat	Council	Raigad	25.54	29,663
Khopoli	Council	Raigad	58.66	108,648
Pen	Council	Raigad	30.20	37,852
Alibag	Council	Raigad	19.49	236,167

== Districts ==
1. Mumbai City (complete)
2. Mumbai Suburban (complete)
3. Thane (partial)
4. Raigad (partial)
5. Palghar (partial)

== Transport ==
Being one of the largest cities in India since and a regional center during the colonial period, Mumbai has an extensive transport network consisting of railways, buses, a rapidly expanding metro system, the only monorail line in India as well as a former tramway system that was discontinued in 1964. Taxis dominate the Mumbai City District, while auto-rickshaws are prevalent in the rest of the metropolitan region.

=== Railway ===
The first passenger train in India from Chhatrapati Shivaji Maharaj Terminus (Bori Bunder railway station) in Mumbai to Thane ran on 16 April 1853 on the track laid by the Great Indian Peninsula Railway. The Mumbai Suburban Railway serves the region, being operated by the Western Railways and the Central Railways. The Suburban Railway, colloquially called "Local trains" or simply "Locals" is the busiest suburban railway system in India as well as one of the busiest commuter rail systems in the world, with an annual ridership of 2.64 billion.

No.	Line Name	Terminals		Stations	Distance (km)
1	Western Line	Churchgate	Dahanu Road	39	124 km (77 mi)
2	Central Line	Chhatrapati Shivaji Terminus	Kasara	62	181 km (112 mi)
2	Central Line	Chhatrapati Shivaji Terminus	Khopoli	62	181 km (112 mi)
3	Harbour Line	Chhatrapati Shivaji Terminus	Panvel	35	74 km (46 mi)
3	Harbour Line	Chhatrapati Shivaji Terminus	Goregaon	35	74 km (46 mi)
4	Trans-Harbour Line	Thane	Vashi	17	38 km (24 mi)
4	Trans-Harbour Line	Thane	Panvel	17	38 km (24 mi)
5	Port Line	Nerul	Uran	10	27 km (17 mi)
5	Port Line	CBD Belapur	Uran	10	27 km (17 mi)
6	Vasai Road–Roha Line	Vasai Road	Roha	23	—N/a
7	Panvel-Karjat Railway Corridor	Panvel	Karjat	5	30 km (19 mi)

=== Metro ===
Mumbai Metropolitan Region has 3 metro systems covering the region. 2 of these, Mumbai Metro and Navi Mumbai Metro are operational, while the Thane Metro system is under construction. Mumbai Metro will serve all municipal corporations, while Navi Mumbai Metro and Thane Metro exist primarily to serve their respective cities. Mumbai Metro has an operational length of 90.95 km (56.51 mi) while Navi Mumbai Metro has an operational length of 11.10 km (6.90 mi). In addition, Mumbai Metro has several new lines and extensions under construction totalling to 132.45 km (82.30 mi). Thane Metro has a proposed length of 29 km (18 mi).

Mumbai is also home to Mumbai Monorail, the only monorail system in the country, which serves the eastern localities of Mumbai City district.

Mumbai
No.	Line Name	Terminals		Stations	Distance (km)	Status
1	Blue	Versova	Ghatkopar	12	11.40 km (7.08 mi)	Operational
2	Yellow	Dahisar East	Andheri West	17	18.6 km (11.6 mi)	Operational
2	Yellow	Andheri West	Mandala	20	23.6 km (14.7 mi)	Partially Operational
3	Aqua	Aarey JVLR	Cuffe Parade	27	33.53 km (20.83 mi)	Operational
4	Green	Gaimukh	Bhakti Park (Wadala)	36	32.32 km (20.08 mi)	Under Construction
4	Green	Shivaji Chowk (Mira Road)	Gaimukh	4	9.37 km (5.82 mi)	Proposed
4	Green	Bhakti Park (Wadala)	Chhatrapati Shivaji Maharaj Terminus	10	12.68 km (7.88 mi)	Proposed
5	Orange	Kapurbawdi	Bhiwandi	8	12.81 km (7.96 mi)	Under Construction
5	Orange	Bhiwandi	Kalyan APMC	9	11.48 km (7.13 mi)	Proposed
5	Orange	Kalyan APMC	Taloja	17	20.75 km (12.89 mi)	Under Construction
6	Pink	Swami Samarth Nagar (Lokhandwala)	Vikhroli EEH	13	14.47 km (8.99 mi)	Under Construction
7	Red	Dahisar East	Gundavali	14	16.5 km (10.3 mi)	Operational
7	Red	Gundavali	Chhatrapati Shivaji Maharaj International Airport - T2	2	3.17 km (1.97 mi)	Proposed
7	Red	Dahisar East	Subhash Chandra Bose Stadium	8	11.38 km (7.07 mi)	Partially Operational
Navi Mumbai
8	Line 1	CBD Belapur	Pendhar	11	11.10 km (6.90 mi)	Operational
Thane
9	Integral Ring	Thane Junction	Shivaji Chowk	22	29 km (18 mi)	Under Construction
Monorail
10	Mumbai Monorail	Chembur	Sant Gadge Maharaj Chowk	17	19.54 km (12.13 mi)	Operational

=== Air ===
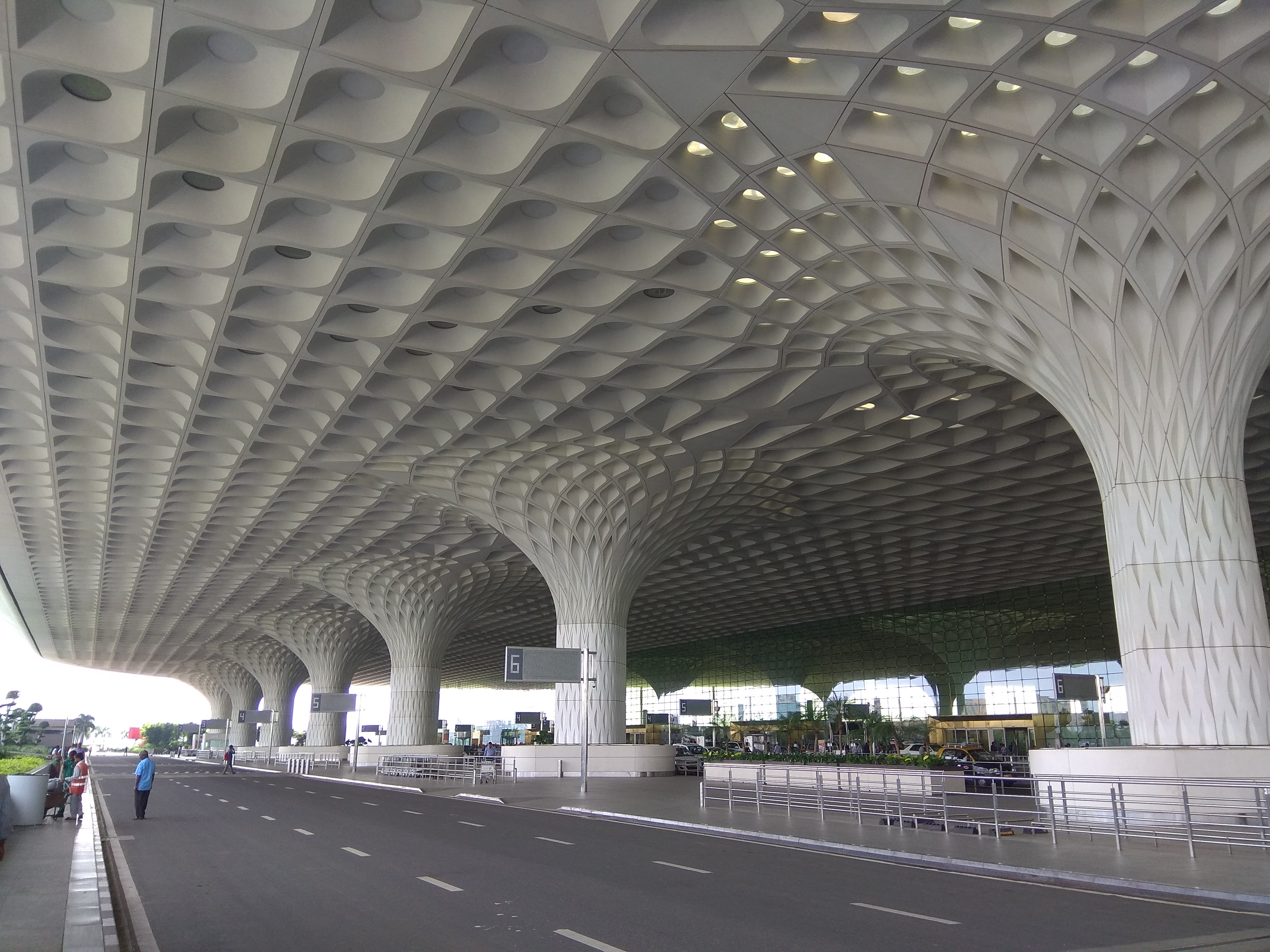
Chhatrapati Shivaji Maharaj International Airport, one of the two airports serving the region

The region has two airports, one located in Greater Mumbai called Chhatrapati Shivaji Maharaj International Airport and the other, Navi Mumbai International Airport is located in Navi Mumbai. There is also one aerodrome known as the Juhu Aerodrome, which is only used for general aviation.

=== Bus ===
- BEST (Mumbai)
- KDMT (Kalyan-Dombivli)
- MBMT (Mira-Bhayandar)
- NMMT (Navi Mumbai)
- TMT (Thane)
- VVMT (Vasai-Virar)

== See also ==
- National Capital Region (India)
- Chennai metropolitan area
- Kolkata metropolitan region
- List of metropolitan areas in India
