= CRZ =

CRZ may refer to:

- Coastal Regulation Zone of India
- Honda CR-Z, a compact hybrid electric automobile manufactured by Honda
- Congestion Relief Zone, a New York City surcharge to most motor vehicular traffic in an effort to encourage commuters to use public transportation instead
