= Green Line (Mumbai Metro) =

Indian rail transit line under construction

Overview
- Status: Under construction: Line 4; Line 4A; Proposed: Line 10; Line 11
- Owner: MMRDA (Note: Except Line 11 (under MMRC since 2023))
- Locale: Mumbai and Thane, Maharashtra, India
- Termini: Shivaji Chowk (Mira Road); Bhakti Park (Wadala)
- Stations: 38 (Main Line) 15 (Branch Line)
- Website: Line 4

Service
- Type: Rapid Transit
- System: Mumbai Metro
- Depot(s): Mogharpada, Anik Nagar Bus Depot
- Rolling stock: Alstom Metropolis

History
- Planned opening: 2027; 1 year's time

Technical
- Num of tracks: 2
- Character: Elevated & Underground
- Track gauge: 1,435 mm (4 ft 8 1/2 in) standard gauge
- Operating speed: 90 km/h (56 mph)
- Highest elevation: 3.90 m (12.8 ft)

Green Line is part of the Mumbai Metro rail network for the city of Mumbai, Maharashtra, India. During construction the line was divided into 3 smaller lines - Line 4 (Kasarvadavali to Bhakti Park (Wadala)), Line 4A (Kasarvadavali to Gaimukh), and Line 10 (Gaimukh to Shivaji Chowk (Mira Road)). The line also has a proposed spur line called Line 11 from Anik Nagar Bus Depot to Gateway of India. The proposed length of the line is 60.409km of which 35.2km is under construction. The line connects the regions of Mira Bhayandar to Wadala via Gaimukh and Kasarvadavali. Construction of Line 4 started in October 2018 and of Line 4A in September 2019. Meanwhile, the proposed Line 10 is currently under environmental review while Line 11 is undergoing Soil testing. The line has a total of elevated 38 stations of which 34 are under construction. The main line is fully elevated and has zero underground stations. In addition, the proposed spur line (Line 11) has 16 stations of which 2 are elevated and the remaining 14 are proposed to be underground.

The line offers interchange with the under construction Orange Line at Kapurbawdi, Pink Line at Gandhi Nagar (Kanjurmarg), and the Yellow Line at Siddharth Colony. In addition the line has a proposed interchange with the Red Line at Shivaji Chowk (Mira Road) and Aqua Line at Chhatrapati Shivaji Maharaj Terminus.

== Planning ==
Green Line
Line Number	Station		Opening	Distance
Line Number	From	To	Opening	Distance
4	Kasarvadavali	Cadbury Junction	December 2026	32.32 km (20.08 mi)
4	Cadbury Junction	Gandhi Nagar (Kanjurmarg)	December 2026	32.32 km (20.08 mi)
4	Gandhi Nagar (Kanjurmarg)	Bhakti Park (Wadala)	November 2027	32.32 km (20.08 mi)
4A	Kasarvadavali	Gaimukh	August 2026	2.88 km (1.79 mi)
10	Gaimukh	Shivaji Chowk (Mira Road)	Proposed	9.209 km (5.722 mi)
Total				61.919 km (38.475 mi)

=== Line 4 ===
In June 2015, the Mumbai Metropolitan Region Development Authority (MMRDA) proposed building a 32 km (19.88 mi) Wadala-Thane-Kasarvadavali metro line as part of a plan to build six new metro lines at a total estimated cost of ₹64,000 crore (US$6.8 billion). Line 4 was approved in June 2016, and was estimated to cost ₹14,549 crore (US$1.6 billion).

The foundation stone for Metro 4 was laid by Prime Minister Narendra Modi on 24 December 2016. The Maharashtra Coastal Zone Management Authority granted Coastal Regulation Zone (CRZ) clearance to the project in February 2017. Over 1 km (0.62 mi) of the line passes over water bodies in Bhakti Park and Wadala, both areas classified as CRZ II, where regulations limit construction activities. A total of 48 piers are proposed to be built in the CRZ II zone. The MMRDA proposed building metro car depots for the line on a 30-hectare (74-acre) plot at Owala village in Thane district and another in Vikhroli. The agency stated that the line would require two depots due to its length.

The MMRDA used a drone to carry out survey work for Metro 4. The drones were fitted with 360 degrees camera that provide up to 3 millimetres (0.12 in) accuracy. The aerial survey takes less time than a regular survey, achieves greater accuracy and helps protect against false claims for compensation.

The MMRDA appointed Systra MVA Consulting India Pvt. Ltd. as the detail design consultants for Line 4 on 9 November 2017. A consortium of DB Engineering, Louis Berger and Hill International was awarded a project management and construction management services contract for the Metro 4 project in April 2018. In October 2018, the MMRDA announced that it would construct Metro 4 along with three flyovers to minimize traffic disruption, with the metro running on the upper deck of the flyover. The three flyovers will be built at Bhayander Pada, Kasarvadavli and Anandnagar near Ghodbunder.

In May 2019, MMRDA Metropolitan Commissioner R.A. Rajeev announced a modified plan to use Siddharth Colony as the interchange station with Line 2. The original plan had proposed to use the Eastern Express Highway station on Line 2B and Siddharth Colony on Line 4 as the interchange stations. However, the two stations are approximately 480 metres (1,570 ft) away from Siddharth Colony and the change was made to simplify passenger transfers.

=== Line 4A ===
In February 2017, the MMRDA said it was studying the feasibility of extending the corridor from Kasarvadavali to Gaimukh. In March 2017, the agency said that it was conducting a pre-feasibility study on extending the line from Wadala to Mumbai General Post Office in South Mumbai, via the Mumbai Port Trust. The proposed 8 km (4.97 mi) extension is estimated to cost ₹300 crore per kilometer. The extension from Kasarvadavli to Gaimukh was approved by Fadnavis at the 144th meeting of the MMRDA on 12 January 2018. The 2.7 km (1.68 mi) extension is estimated to cost ₹949 crore (US$100 million).

=== Line 10 ===
In June 2015, the MMRDA announced Metro Master Plan covering over 300 km of metro lines to decongest roads and reduce pressure on the suburban railway system. As part of the master plan it announced a brand new line named Line 10, which would serve as an extension of the announced Line 4. The line would start in Gaimukh and terminate in Shivaji Chowk (Mira Road) where it would intersect with the Red Line. The line is proposed to add 4 brand new stations, all of which are proposed to be elevated despite the line having some underground sections.MMRDA later stated that the Line 4, 4A, and Line 10 would form the Green Line. In December 2022 MMRDA appointed SYSTRA MVA Consulting – DB Engineering & Consulting JV as the General Consultant responsible for the execution of the line. The line is currently awaiting environmental clearance for construction as it passes through the Sanjay Gandhi National Park.

=== Line 11 ===
Initially, Line 11 was announced as an extension from the Line 4 to the Chhatrapati Shivaji Maharaj Terminus, with a proposal for 2 elevated stations and 8 underground sections running from Wadala to the CSMT. The Maharashtra government assigned the task of executing the project to MMRDA. However, very early on, the project was transferred from the MMRDA to the MMRCL. This change in implementing agency saw the line being completely reworked. MMRCL announced a new alignment for the line, taking a more central route south of Byculla. The rework saw the line being converted to that of a spur line rather than a natural extension of the Green Line. It also saw the addition of new stations and the extension of the line beyond CSMT. The line construction estimates were also doubled from Rs.8,739 crore to Rs.16,000 crore.

In May 2025, as part of the Dharavi redevelopment project, it was proposed that the northern spur of Line 11 be extended from Anik Nagar Bus Depot to Dharavi via Sion. This proposal was part of the Dharavi redevelopment project, which included efforts to turn Dharavi into a transportation hub in Mumbai.

=== Depot ===
The MMRDA considered plots in Wadala, Aarey Colony and Gaimukh Nagar in Thane to build a depot for the line. On 16 October 2023, the state urban development allotted a 174-hectare (430-acre) plot of land at Mogharpada in Thane to the MMRDA at no cost. Nine hectares of the plot is reserved for use by the BMC for the Coastal Road and a further 29 hectares (72 acres) is protected mangrove land. The MMRDA will utilize a portion of the remaining plot to build a depot that serves Lines 4, 4A & 10. The land left over after building the depot is zoned for residential and commercial use.

== Construction ==
=== Tendering ===
Civil Work
Package	Section	Length	Successful bid/cost	Contractor	Award
CA-08	Wadala – Amar Mahal Junction	6.29 km (3.91 mi)	₹540.00 crore (US$58 million)	Reliance – Astaldi JV	03 Mar 2018
CA-09	Amar Mahal Junction – Surya Nagar	6.41 km (3.98 mi)	₹538.03 crore (US$57 million)	TPL – CHEC JV	03 Mar 2018
CA-10	Surya Nagar – Sonapur	6.68 km (4.15 mi)	₹513.00 crore (US$55 million)	Reliance – Astaldi JV	03 Mar 2018
CA-11	Sonapur – Majiwada	6.10 km (3.79 mi)	₹510.22 crore (US$55 million)	TPL – CHEC JV	03 Mar 2018
CA-12	Majiwada – Kasarvadavali	6.84 km (4.25 mi)	₹531.00 crore (US$57 million)	Reliance – Astaldi JV	03 Mar 2018
CA-54	Kasarvadavali – Gaimukh	2.88 km (1.79 mi)	₹342.00 crore (US$37 million)	J Kumar	13 Sept 2019
Total		35.20 km (21.87 mi)	₹2,974.25 crore (US$320 million)		
Architectural Finishing Works
Package	Section		Successful bid/cost	Contractor	Award
CA-194	Majiwada – Mulund Fire Station		₹245.64 crore (US$26 million)	Eagle Infra	08 Feb 2024
CA-222	Surya Nagar – Garodia Nagar		₹251.02 crore (US$27 million)	Godrej and Boyce	29 Feb 2024
CA-243	Hiranandani Estate – Kapurbawdi		Bidding Underway		
CA-257	Gaimukh – Vijay Garden		Bidding Underway		
Total			₹496.66 crore (US$53 million)		
Multi Modal Integration
Package	Section		Successful bid/cost	Contractor	Award
MMI1	Bhakti Park – Shreyas Cinema		₹139.71 crore (US$15 million)	NA Construction – J Kumar JV	24 Jun 2025
MMI2	Godrej Company – Shangrila		₹128.84 crore (US$14 million)	Dev Engineers – PRS Infra JV	24 Jun 2025
MMI3	Sonapur – Majiwada		₹140.25 crore (US$15 million)	NA Construction	24 Jun 2025
MMI4	Kapurbawdi – Gaimukh		₹126.26 crore (US$13 million)	NA Construction – SARE JV	24 Jun 2025
Total			₹535.06 crore (US$57 million)		
Miscellaneous
Package	Contract		Successful bid/cost	Contractor	Award
CA-160	Moghapada Depot Construction		₹905.77 crore (US$97 million)	SEW – VSE	26 Sept 2023
CA-161	Track Work for Mulund Fire Station – Gaimukh		₹121.55 crore (US$13 million)	Apurvakriti Infra	26 Sept 2023
CA-168	Track Work for Bhakti Park – Mulund Fire Station		₹188.59 crore (US$20 million)	Larsen & Toubro	24 Jun 2025
CA-234	Rolling Stock, Platform Screen Door & Signaling Contract		₹4,788 crore (US$510 million)	Larsen & Toubro – Alstom	24 Jun 2025
CA-237	Automated fare collection system		₹249.97 crore (US$27 million)	Aurionpro Solutions	24 Jun 2025
CA-298	Power Supply & Traction, E&M, Lifts & Escalators		₹1,260 crore (US$130 million)	Larsen & Toubro	27 Nov 2025
Total			₹7,513.88 crore (US$800 million)		
Total Cost			₹11,492.85 crore (US$1.2 billion)		

=== Line 4 & Line 4A ===
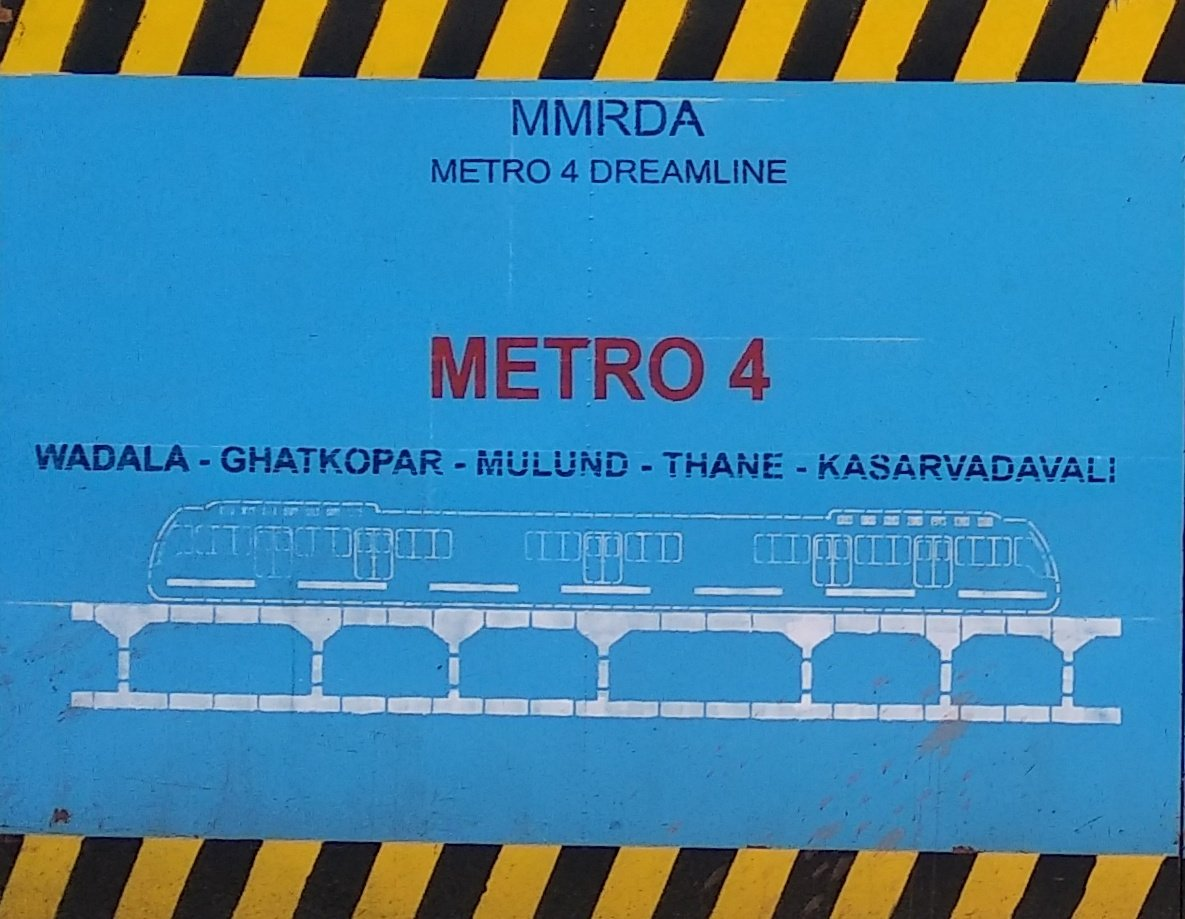
A construction barricade along the Line 4 route

The MMRDA invited bids for civil work on the corridor on 4 January 2017. The tenders for construction of viaducts and stations were divided into five packages - Wadala to Amar Mahal Junction, Garodia Nagar to Surya Nagar, Gandhi Nagar to Sonapur, Mulund Fire Station to Majiwada and Kapurbawdi to Kasarvadavali. Metro 4 was tendered alongside Metro 2B. L&T, Afcons Infrastructure, Tata, NCC and JMC, Reliance Infrastructure-RdE, JKumar Group, ITD Cementation, CHEC-TPL bid for packages on both Metro 2B and Metro 4. A total of 10 firms and/or consortia submitted bids for the two lines, two of whom (Simplex Infrastructure and a consortium of GHEC-RCC-JV-China) bid exclusively for Metro 2B packages.

The construction work was awarded through the engineering, procurement and construction (EPC) model in April 2018. A joint venture between Reliance Infrastructure and Italian firm Astaldi S.p.A. was awarded three packages between Kasarwadavali and Wadala worth ₹1,584 crore (US$170 million). The contract for the remaining two packages, worth a combined ₹1,048 crore (US$110 million), was awarded to a joint venture between Tata Projects Limited and China Harbour Engineering Company. The civil work was expected to be completed in 30 months. Construction began in October 2018. About 80% of soil-investigation works and 66% of utility works had been completed by 3 June 2019.

In September 2019, the MMRDA awarded a ₹342 crore (US$37 million) contract to J Kumar Infraprojects to build the viaduct and two stations for the Metro 4A extension from Kasarvadavli to Gaimukh. In August 2020, the Bombay High Court granted the MMRDA permission to carry out construction in a mangrove buffer zone. Survey work on the land for a depot at Mogharpada began in January 2022.

The MMRDA stated that 37% of total work on Lines 4 and 4A had been completed by June 2022. The agency stated that 43.44% of viaducts and 25.20% of work on stations on Line 4 had been completed. On Line 4A, 39.03% of viaducts and 19.82% of work on stations was completed. By November 2022, 41% of civil works on Line 4 and 45% of work on Line 4A had been completed.

The Bombay High Court dismissed two petitions filed by Indo Nippon Chemical Co. Ltd. and Shree Yashwant Co-operative Housing Society Ltd. challenging the alignment for Line 4 in March 2023. In September 2023, the MMRDA awarded a ₹905 crore (US$97 million) contract to a joint venture between SEW Infrastructure and Vishwa Samudra Engineering to build the depot at Mogharpada. It also awarded a ₹121 crore (US$13 million) to Apurvakriti Infrastructure Pvt Ltd. lay ballastless railway tracks connecting Mulund Fire Station with Gaimukh and the depot.

== Stations ==
32 stations are being planned on Line 4. Most of them were either in the stage of planning or under early stages of construction (as of November 2018) 2 stations are being planned on Line 4A. Connected to word Gaimukh to Kasarvadavali also connect Metro 10.

=== Main Line ===
Green Line
#	Station Name		Opening	Connections	Layout
#	English	Marathi	Opening	Connections	Layout
Line 10
1	Shivaji Chowk (Mira Road)	शिवाजी चौक (मिरा रोड)	Proposed	Line 9 Miragaon (under construction)	Elevated
2	Kashimira	काशिमिरा	Proposed	None	Elevated
3	Varsova Char Phata	वर्सोवा चार फाटा	Proposed	None	Elevated
4	Gaimukh Reti Bandar	गायमुख रेती बंदर	Proposed	None	Elevated
Line 4A
5	Gaimukh	गायमुख	2027	None	Elevated
6	Gowniwada	गोवनीवाडा	2027	None	Elevated
Line 4
7	Kasarvadavali	कासारवडवली	2027	None	Elevated
8	Vijay Garden	विजय गार्डन	2027	None	Elevated
9	Dongripada	डोंगरीपाडा	2027	Dongripada (under Construction)	Elevated
10	Tikuji-ni-wadi	टिकूजी-नी-वाडी	2027	None	Elevated
11	Manpada (Thane)	मानपाडा (ठाणे)	2027	None	Elevated
12	Kapurbawdi	कापूरबावडी	2027	Line 5 (under construction)	Elevated
13	Majiwada	माजिवडा	2027	None	Elevated
14	Cadbury Junction	कॅडबरी जंक्शन	2027	None	Elevated
15	Mahapalika Marg	महापालिका मार्ग	2027	None	Elevated
16	RTO Thane	आरटीओ ठाणे	2027	None	Elevated
17	Teen Haath Naka (Thane)	तीन हात नाका (ठाणे)	2027	Raila Devi (under construction)	Elevated
18	Mulund Naka	मुलुंड नाका	2027	None	Elevated
19	Mulund Fire Station	मुलुंड अग्निशमन केंद्र	2027	None	Elevated
20	Sonapur	सोनापूर	2027	None	Elevated
21	Shangrila	शांग्रीला	2027	None	Elevated
22	Bhandup	भांडुप	2027	None	Elevated
23	Bhandup Mahapalika	भांडुप महापालिका	2027	None	Elevated
24	Naval Housing	नौदल गृहनिर्माण	2027	None	Elevated
25	Gandhi Nagar (Kanjurmarg)	गांधी नगर (कांजुर मार्ग)	2027	Line 6 Kanjurmarg (West) (under construction)	Elevated
26	Surya Nagar	सूर्य नगर	2027	None	Elevated
27	Vikhroli	विक्रोळी	2027	None	Elevated
28	Godrej Company	गोदरेज कंपनी	2027	None	Elevated
29	Shreyas Cinema	श्रेयस सिनेमा	2027	None	Elevated
30	Laxmi Nagar (Ghatkopar)	लक्ष्मी नगर (घाटकोपर)	2027	None	Elevated
31	Pant Nagar	पंत नगर	2027	None	Elevated
32	Garodia Nagar	गरोडिया नगर	2027	Line 8 (proposed)	Elevated
33	Amar Mahal Junction	अमर महल जंक्शन	2027	None	Elevated
34	Siddharth Colony	सिद्धार्थ कॉलनी	2027	Line 2B Eastern Express Highway (under construction)	Elevated
35	Suman Nagar	सुमन नगर	2027	None	Elevated
36	Anik Nagar Bus Depot	आणिक नगर बस आगार	2027	None	Elevated
37	Wadala Truck Terminal	वडाळा ट्रक टर्मिनल	2027	None	Elevated
38	Bhakti Park (Wadala)	भक्ती पार्क (वडाळा)	2027	Bhakti Park	Elevated

=== Branch Line ===
Line 11
#	Station Name		Opening	Connections	Layout
#	English	Marathi	Opening	Connections	Layout
1	Anik Nagar Bus Depot	आणिक नगर बस डेपो	Proposed	None	At Grade
2	CGS Colony	सीजीएस कॉलनी	Proposed	Mumbai Monorail	Underground
3	Ganesh Nagar	गणेश नगर	Proposed	None	Underground
4	BPT Hospital	बीपीटी हॉस्पिटल	Proposed	None	Underground
5	Sewri	शिवडी	Proposed	Harbour	Underground
6	Hay Bunder	गवत बंदर	Proposed	None	Underground
7	Coal Bunder	कोळसा बंदर	Proposed	None	Underground
8	Reay Road	रे रोड	Proposed	Harbour	Underground
9	Byculla	भायखळा	Proposed	Central	Underground
10	Nagpada Junction	नागपाडा जंक्शन	Proposed	None	Underground
11	Bhendi Bazaar	भेंडी बाजार	Proposed	None	Underground
12	Crawford Market	क्रॉफर्ड मार्केट	Proposed	None	Underground
13	Chhatrapati Shivaji Maharaj Terminus	छत्रपती शिवाजी महाराज टर्मिनस	Proposed	Line 3 Central Harbour	Underground
14	Horniman Circle	हॉर्निमन सर्कल	Proposed	None	Underground
15	SPM Circle	एस.पी.एम. सर्कल	Proposed	None	Underground

== Cost ==
Line 4 is estimated to cost ₹14,549 crore (US$1.6 billion), and Line 4A is estimated to cost ₹949 crore (US$100 million). The Maharashtra Government signed an €545 million (₹4,000 crore) loan agreement with German development bank KfW to fund construction of Metro 4 and 4A in November 2020.

== Infrastructure ==
=== Rolling stock ===
The MMRDA awarded a ₹1,854 crore (US$200 million) contract to Alstom to supply 234 metro coaches for Line 4 and 4A in March 2021. This was Alstom's first order after acquiring Bombardier Transportation in January 2021. However, the company initially cancelled the order in March 2022, citing delays in completing the project. In February 2025, Larsen & Toubro (L&T), in collaboration with Alstom, has been awarded a significant contract to supply critical systems for the line. This contract encompasses the provision of 39 six-coach trains, Communication-Based Train Control (CBTC) signaling and train control systems, telecommunications, platform screen doors, and depot machinery and plant for the Mogharpada Depot.

=== Depot ===
The depot for the line is located at Mogharpada in Thane. It will also serve as the depot for Line 10 and Line 11. The depot has a maximum capacity for 64 stabling lines, half of which are reserved for future use, in addition to 10 inspection bays lines and 10 workshop lines. The depot also houses the operational control centre, administrative building, maintenance and workshop building, auxiliary substation, and staff quarters.

=== Pocket track ===
The Bhakti Park station will have a pocket track to enable trains to park off the main line. Line 4's depot at Mogharpada also serves Line 10 and Line 11 which creates the possibility of trains having to run without passengers from the depot to Chhatrapati Shivaji Terminus during morning hours. The pocket track enables trains to park off the main line without traveling to the last station on the line.
