= Orange Line (Mumbai Metro) =

Metro line in Mumbai, India

Overview
- Status: Under construction: Line 5 Line 12
- Owner: Mumbai Metropolitan Region Development Authority (MMRDA)
- Locale: Mumbai Metropolitan Region, Maharashtra, India
- Termini: Kapurbawdi; Kalyan APMC
- Stations: 34
- Website: Line 5

Service
- Type: Rapid transit
- System: Mumbai Metro
- Depot: Kasheli
- Rolling stock: Titagarh Rail Systems

History
- Work began: February 2020
- Planned opening: December 2026; 32 days' time

Technical
- Line length: 45.70 km (28.40 mi)
- Character: Elevated and underground
- Track gauge: 1,435 mm (4 ft 8 1/2 in) standard gauge

Orange Line of the Mumbai Metro is a rapid transit metro line in the city of Mumbai, Maharashtra, India. During construction the line was divided into two smaller lines - Line 5 (Kapurbawdi to Kalyan APMC) and Line 12 (Kalyan APMC to Taloja). The 45.70 km (28.40 mi) line will connect Thane with Taloja via Bhiwandi and Kalyan. Construction of Line 5 began in February 2020. However, the section from Bhiwandi to Kalyan APMC was put on hold by the State Government. The construction of Line 12 started in March 2020. The line is mostly elevated except for a small underground section in Bhiwandi. The line has a total of 34 stations, of which 33 are elevated, while the station in Bhiwandi is set to be the only underground station on the line. The line offers interchange with the Green Line at Kapurbawdi and with the Navi Mumbai Metro at Taloja. The line also has a proposed interchange with the Thane Metro at Balkum Naka.

== Planning ==
Orange Line
Line number	Station		Opening	Distance
Line number	From	To	Opening	Distance
5A	Kapurbawdi	Dhamankar Naka	December 2026	23.53 km (14.62 mi)
5B	Dhamankar Naka	Kalyan Railway Station	TBA	23.53 km (14.62 mi)
12	Kalyan Railway Station	Taloja	December 2027	22.17 km (13.78 mi)
Total				45.70 km (28.40 mi)

=== Line 5 ===
In March 2016, the Mumbai Railway Vikas Corporation proposed building an elevated suburban rail corridor from Kurla to Bhiwandi via Thane at an estimated cost of ₹7,500 crore (US$780 million). On 19 October 2016, the Mumbai Metropolitan Region Development Authority (MMRDA), headed by Chief Minister Devendra Fadnavis, approved a plan to build 24 km metro rail line from Thane to Kalyan via Bhiwandi. The line would have 17 stations and was estimated to cost ₹8,416 crore (US$870 million). A future extension to Taloja was also proposed. The project was approved by the Maharashtra Cabinet on 24 October 2017. The detailed project report for Line 5 was prepared by a consortium of D’Appolonia and Tata Consultancy Services (TCS).

The project received Coastal Regulation Zone (CRZ) clearance from the Maharashtra Coastal Zone Management Authority (MCZMA) in June 2017. A 3.9 km stretch of Line 5 passes through CRZ areas along the Kasheli bridge crossing the Ulhas river, and also near Durgadi Fort. The MMRDA utilized a drone to carry out survey work for Line 5. The drones were fitted with 360 degrees camera that provide up to 3 millimetres (0.12 in) accuracy. The aerial survey takes less time than a regular survey, achieves greater accuracy and helps protect against false claims for compensation.

Two potential routes were proposed for Line 5's alignment. The first route passed through more densely populated areas of Thane, Bhiwandi and Kalyan, while the second route passed through their outskirts. The Bhiwandi-Nizampur City Municipal Corporation demanded that the first route be taken in order to benefit more people. The MMRDA began carrying out survey work for the line by December 2017. The same month, the MMRDA stated that it had chosen the first route as the alignment for Line 5. Survey work was interrupted due to protests by some shopkeepers and residents of Bhiwandi.

Prime Minister Narendra Modi laid the foundation stone for Line 5 in Kalyan on 18 December 2018. In June 2019, the MMRDA stated that it had decided to start Line 5 from Kapurbawdi station, which would serve as an interchange with Line 4. The original plan had been to build a separate station 500 metres away from the Line 4 station. Systra France, Systra MVA Consulting (India) Pvt Ltd and Consulting Engineers Group Ltd were appointed as general consultants for the project on 6 August 2019.

In November 2021, the MMRDA decided to construct the depot for Line 5 at Kasheli in Thane, instead of the original plan to build it at Kongaon MIDC, after local residents opposed the plan. The agency invited tenders for the construction of the depot on 20 October 2022. Ritwik Projects Pvt. Ltd. was awarded a ₹589 crore (US$61 million) contract to build the Kasheli depot in September 2023.

=== Underground section ===
In December 2017 following requests from the Bhiwandi-Nizampur city municipal corporation the line was altered to bypass through core areas of Thane, Kalyan, and Bhiwandi. Soon however, locals in Bhiwandi began protesting over the line going through the area. Later in 2019, MMRDA released the tenders for the line through package CA-28. However, it was later announced the package will only include the section from Kapurbawdi to Bhiwandi with the section from Bhiwandi to Kalyan APMC being placed on hold due to disagreements in alignment. In February 2020, State Urban Development Minister Eknath Shinde stated that he had requested the MMRDA to alter the alignment of Line 5 to bypass several religious sites, and also to extend the line to Shahad. MMRDA Metropolitan Commissioner R.A. Rajeev stated that the agency would finalize a new route. In March 2022, Shinde stated that a stretch of the line passing through Bhiwandi would be underground in order to avoid affecting 735 buildings. The State Urban Development Department approved building a 3 km section of Line 5 between Dhamankar Naka and Temghar underground on 6 June 2023. The underground section is estimated to increase the cost of the project by ₹1,727 crore (US$180 million).

=== Line 12 ===
The MMRDA approved an extension of Line 5 from Kalyan to Dombivali and Taloja on 21 November 2018. The elevated corridor would be 20.75 km long with 17 stations and was estimated to cost ₹5,865 crore (US$610 million). The extension is called Line 12. The detailed project report for the extension was prepared by the DMRC. The extension was approved by the State Government on 23 July 2019.

In March 2023, the MMRDA proposed a 7.7 km extension of Line 5 from Kalyan to Ulhasnagar.

In October 2026, the MMRDA approved the 18.4 km Line 12A, which will connect Katai Mala and Taloja via Shilphata. The route will improve connectivity of Shilphata with Navi Mumbai and Kalyan-Dombivali.

== Construction ==
=== Tendering ===
Pre-Construction activity
Package	Contract	Section	Successful bid/cost	Contractor	Award
Metro- PIU/0002021	General Consultant	Kapurbawdi – Bhiwandi	₹42.49 crore (US$4.4 million)	SYSTRA MVA	Aug 2019
CA-256	General Consultant	Bhiwandi – Kalyan Railway Station	Bidding underway		
Metro- PIU/0002141	General Consultant	Kalyan Railway Station – Taloja	₹183.53 crore (US$19 million)	SYSTRA MVA – DB Engineering JV	29 July 2022
TBD	Detailed Design Consultant	Bhiwandi – Kalyan Railway Station	Bids to be invited		
TBD	Detailed Design Consultant	Kalyan Railway Station – Taloja	₹6.51 crore (US$680,000)	LKT - Enia JV	13 Jun 2023
Total			₹190.04 crore (US$20 million)		
Civil Work
Package	Section	Length	Successful bid/cost	Contractor	Award
CA-28	Kapurbawdi – Bhiwandi	12.81 km (7.96 mi)	₹802.00 crore (US$83 million)	Afcons	07 Jan 2020
TBD	Bhiwandi – Kalyan Railway Station	11.64 km (7.23 mi)	Bids to be invited		
CA-240	Kalyan Railway Station – Amandoot	22.17 km (13.78 mi)	₹1,971.77 crore (US$200 million)	Gawar Constructions	27 Mar 2024
Total		46.62 km (28.97 mi)	₹2,773.77 crore (US$290 million)		
Architectural finishing work
Package	Contract		Successful bid/cost	Contractor	Award
CA-246	Balkum Naka – Dhamankar Naka		₹157.47 crore (US$16 million)	NACPL-MANSI-UCC JV	25 July 2024
Miscellaneous
Package	Contract		Successful bid/cost	Contractor	Award
CA-151	Kasheli Depot construction		₹597.56 crore (US$62 million)	Rithwik Projects	14 Sept 2023
CA-166	Track work for Bhiwandi – Kalyan APMC		₹17.53 crore (US$1.8 million)	Paras Railtech	28 Feb 2024
CA-239	Power supply & traction, E&M, lifts & escalators		₹497.46 crore (US$52 million)	IRCON	To be confirmed
CA-241	Rolling stock, platform screen door & signaling contract		To be confirmed	Titagarh	To be confirmed
CA-242	Automated fare collection system		Bidding underway		
Total			₹4,233.83 crore (US$440 million)		

Construction of the 24.9 km line was divided into two phases. The first phase is a 11.68 km section between Kapurbawadi in Thane and Dhamankar Naka in Bhiwandi. The second phase is a 11.8 km section between Bhiwandi and Kalyan, which includes a 3 km underground section between Dhamankar Naka and Temghar.

=== Line 5A – Thane to Bhiwandi ===
In January 2019 MMRDA invited bids for the construction of the line from Kapurbawdi to Bhiwandi. The package was named CA-28 and included the construction of a 12.811 km elevated viaduct, and seven elevated stations at Kapurbawdi, Balkum Naka, Kasheli, Kalher, Purna, Anjur Phata, and Dhamankar Naka. Three companies made bids for the package, which were Larsen & Turbo, NCC, and Afcons infrastructure. On January 7, 2020 MMRDA awarded a Letter Of Appointment or LOA to a Afcons Infrastructure for an approximate cost of Rs. 802 crore. Construction began in February 2020. The first pier cap was erected near Balkum in Thane on 22 January 2021.

One construction worker died after being electrocuted at a construction site in Thane on 25 May 2021. Police registered first information reports against the site supervisor and a crane operator charging them with "causing death by negligence". The first marine pile cap was placed on Kasheli Creek in October 2021. The metro viaduct crossing the Kasheli creek is 550 metres long, and consists of 13 piers, of which 9 are in the creek and 5 are on land. The viaduct is 15 metres above the water and has 13 spans each with a length of 42.3 metres.

In 2021, five construction workers were injured by falling iron rods at the site. The MMRDA said that 65% of the work had been completed in November 2022, and 70% in December 2022 including 64% of work on stations. Construction of the 550 metre viaduct over Kasheli Creek was completed on 22 January 2023, taking a total of 123 days. In the same month, Afcons stated that it completed 9.3 km of viaducts. The MMRDA stated that 79% of civil work on the first phase had been completed on 6 June 2023.

== Stations ==
The Orange Line has a total of 34 stations. 33 are elevated, while the station in Bhiwandi is underground. Of the 34 stations, 26 are under construction and six are under various stages of tendering.

Orange Line
#	Station name		Status	Connections	Layout
#	English	Marathi	Status	Connections	Layout
Line 5
1	Kapurbawdi	कापूरबावडी	December 2026	Green Line (under construction)	Elevated
2	Balkum Naka	बाळकुम नाका	December 2026	Balkum Naka (under construction)	Elevated
3	Kasheli	कशेळी	December 2026	None	Elevated
4	Kalher	काल्हेर	December 2026	None	Elevated
5	Purna	पूर्णा	December 2026	None	Elevated
6	Anjur Phata	अंजूर फाटा	December 2026	Vasai Road–Roha	Elevated
7	Dhamankar Naka	धामणकर नाका	December 2026	None	Elevated
8	Bhiwandi	भिवंडी	Approved	None	Elevated
9	Gopal Nagar	गोपाळ नगर	Approved	None	Elevated
10	Temghar	टेमघर	Approved	None	Elevated
11	Rajnouli Village	रांजणोली गाव	Approved	None	Elevated
12	Govegaon MIDC	गोवेगाव एमआयडीसी	Approved	None	Elevated
13	Kongaon	कोनगाव	Approved	None	Elevated
14	Durgadi Fort	दुर्गाडी किल्ला	Approved	None	Elevated
15	Sahajanand Chowk	सहजानंद चौक	Approved	None	Elevated
Line 12
16	Kalyan Railway Station	कल्याण रेल्वे स्थानक	Under construction	Central and Indian Railways	Elevated
17	Kalyan APMC	कल्याण एपीएमसी	Under construction	None	Elevated
18	Ganesh Nagar (Kalyan)	गणेश नगर (कल्याण)	Under construction	None	Elevated
19	Pisavali Gaon	पिसवली गाव	Under construction	None	Elevated
20	Golavali	गोळवली	Under construction	None	Elevated
21	Dombivali MIDC	डोंबिवली एमआयडीसी	Under construction	None	Elevated
22	Sagaon	सागाव	Under construction	None	Elevated
23	Sonarpada	सोनारपाडा	Under construction	None	Elevated
24	Manpada (Dombivali East)	मानपाडा (डोंबिवली पूर्व)	Under construction	None	Elevated
25	Hedutane	हेदुटणे	Under construction	None	Elevated
26	Kolegaon	कोळेगाव	Under construction	None	Elevated
27	Nilaje Gaon	निळजे गाव	Under construction	None	Elevated
28	Vadavali	वडवली	Under construction	None	Elevated
29	Bale	बाळे	Under construction	None	Elevated
30	Waklan	वाकळण	Under construction	None	Elevated
31	Turbhe	तुर्भे	Under construction	None	Elevated
32	Pisarve Depot	पिसार्वे आगार	Under construction	None	Elevated
33	Pisarve	पिसार्वे	Under construction	None	Elevated
34	Amandoot	अमनदूत	Under construction	Amandoot	Elevated

== Cost ==
Line 5 is estimated to cost ₹8,416 crore (US$870 million). The cost was primarily borne by the MMRDA. The Asian Infrastructure Investment Bank and the OPEC Fund for International Development provided a total loan of ₹2,357.25 crore (US$240 million) for the project.
