= Gold Line (Mumbai Metro) =

Rapid transit line in Mumbai

Overview
- Status: Approved by the State Government
- Owner: MMRDA; CIDCO
- Locale: Mumbai, Maharashtra, India
- Termini: CSMIA T2; NMIA T2

Service
- Type: Airport Express Train
- System: Mumbai Metro

Technical
- Line length: 35 km (22 mi)
- Character: Elevated, Underground
- Track gauge: 1,435 mm (4 ft 8 1/2 in) standard gauge

Line 8 or the Gold Line is an approved line of the Mumbai Metro. It would run from Chhatrapati Shivaji Maharaj International Airport to Navi Mumbai International Airport. The 35-kilometre (22 mi) line would be both elevated and underground and cost ₹150,000,000,000.

It has been approved by the Government of Maharashtra, the Detailed Project Report may be made by CIDCO. It is to be developed in a Public-Private Partnership (PPP) model, similar to Mumbai Metro Blue Line 1.

== Stations ==
Gold Line (Line 8)
| # | Station | | Interchange | Opened | Alignment |
| # | English | Marathi | Interchange | Opened | Alignment |
| 1 | Chhatrapati Shivaji Maharaj International Airport - T2 | छत्रपती शिवाजी महाराज आंतरराष्ट्रीय विमानतळ - टी२ | Line 7A (under construction) Line 3 | Proposed | Underground |
| 2 | Phoenix Mall | फिनिक्स मॉल | | Proposed | Underground |
| 3 | SG Barve Marg | एस.जी. बर्वे मार्ग | Line 2B (under construction) | Proposed | Underground |
| 4 | Kurla | कुर्ला | | Proposed | Underground |
| 5 | Lokmanya Tilak Terminus | लोकमान्य टिळक टर्मिनस | | Proposed | Underground |
| 6 | Garodia Nagar | गरोडिया नगर | Green Line (under construction) | Proposed | Underground |
| 7 | Baiganwadi | बैगनवाडी | | Proposed | Elevated |
| 8 | Mankhurd | मानखुर्द | Line 2B | Proposed | Elevated |
| 9 | ISBT | आयएसबीटी | | Proposed | Elevated |
| 10 | Vashi | वाशी | | Proposed | Elevated |
| 11 | Sanpada | सानपाडा | | Proposed | Elevated |
| 12 | Juinagar | जुईनगर | | Proposed | Elevated |
| 13 | LP | एल.पी. | | Proposed | Elevated |
| 14 | Nerul | नेरुळ | | Proposed | Elevated |
| 15 | Seawoods | सीवूड्स | | Proposed | Elevated |
| 16 | Apollo | अपोलो | | Proposed | Elevated |
| 17 | Sagar Sangam | सागर संगम | | Proposed | Elevated |
| 18 | Targhar | तरघर | | Proposed | Elevated |
| 19 | Navi Mumbai International Airport West | नवी मुंबई आंतरराष्ट्रीय विमानतळ पश्चिम | | Proposed | Elevated |
| 20 | Navi Mumbai International Airport Terminal 2 | नवी मुंबई आंतरराष्ट्रीय विमानतळ टर्मिनल २ | Line 1 | Proposed | Elevated |
