= Vikhroli railway station =

Railway Station in Maharashtra, India

Vikhroli Railway station
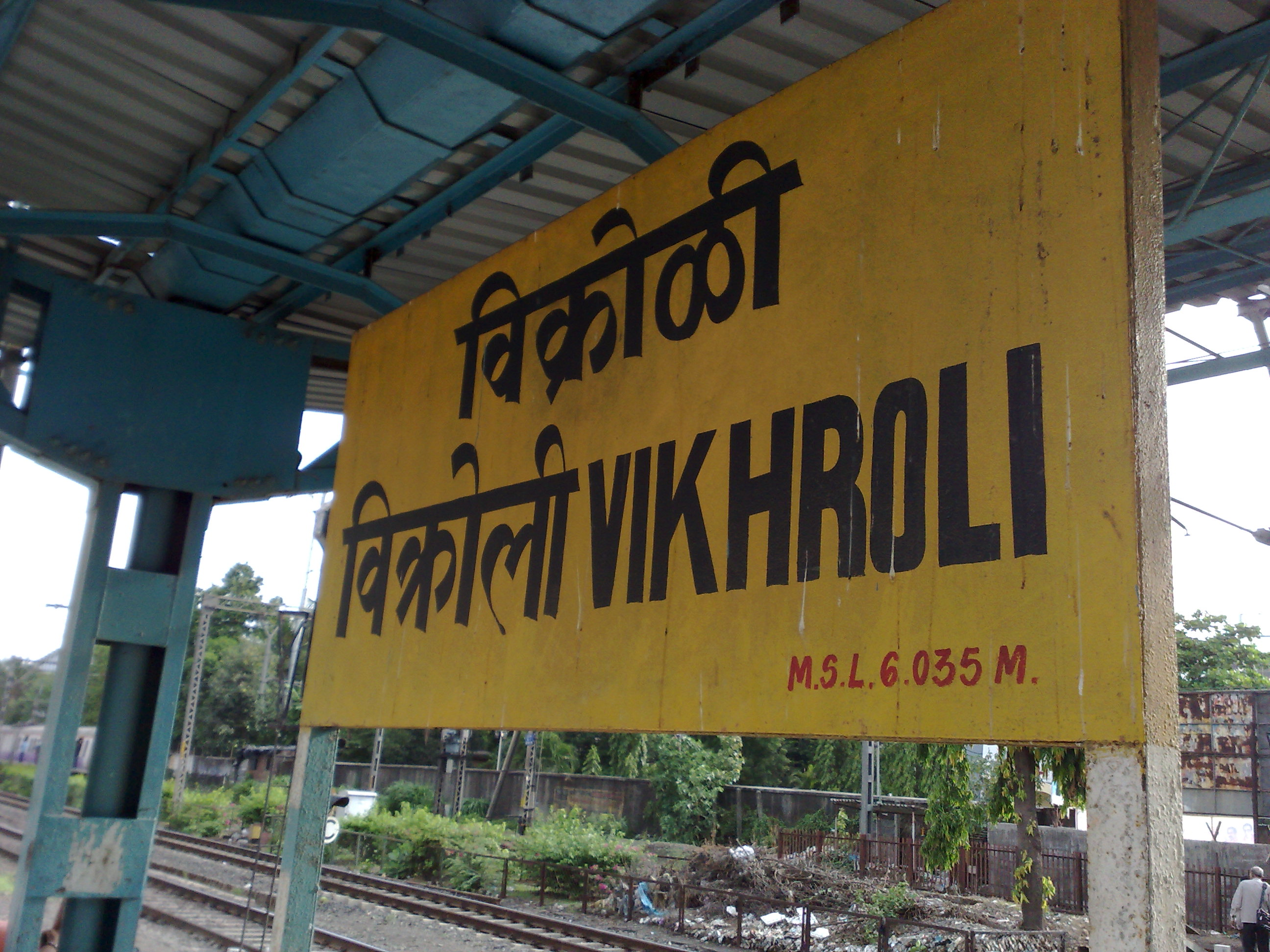

General information
- Coordinates: 19.11°N 72.92°E
- Elevation: 6.035 metres (19.80 ft)
- System: Indian Railways and Mumbai Suburban Railway station
- Owner: Ministry of Railways, Indian Railways
- Line: Central Line
- Platforms: 4

Construction
- Structure type: Standard on-ground station

Other information
- Status: Active
- Station code: VK
- Fare zone: Central Railways

History
- Opened: 1902-1907

Services
Preceding station	Mumbai Suburban Railway	Following station
Ghatkopar towards Chhatrapati Shivaji Terminus	Central line	Kanjur Marg towards Kasara or Khopoli
Route map
Location
- Location within India Location within Maharashtra Location within Mumbai

Vikhroli (station code: VK) is a railway station on the Central Line of the Mumbai Suburban Railway.

Vikhroli station banner

Vikhroli railway station – Platformboard 1

== History ==
In 1942, The Godrej family brought plots in Vikhroli. Sir Phirojsha Godrej brought entire village in order to set up industrial township. The station was built to serve the Godrej Industries Complex which houses several Godrej factories and IT companies like Accenture, Atos, Capgemini, WNS etc. The old Godrej railway siding were crucial links that helped in setting up democracy in India by helping to conduct first general election.
