= Ghatkopar railway station =

Railway station in Mumbai, India

Ghatkopar
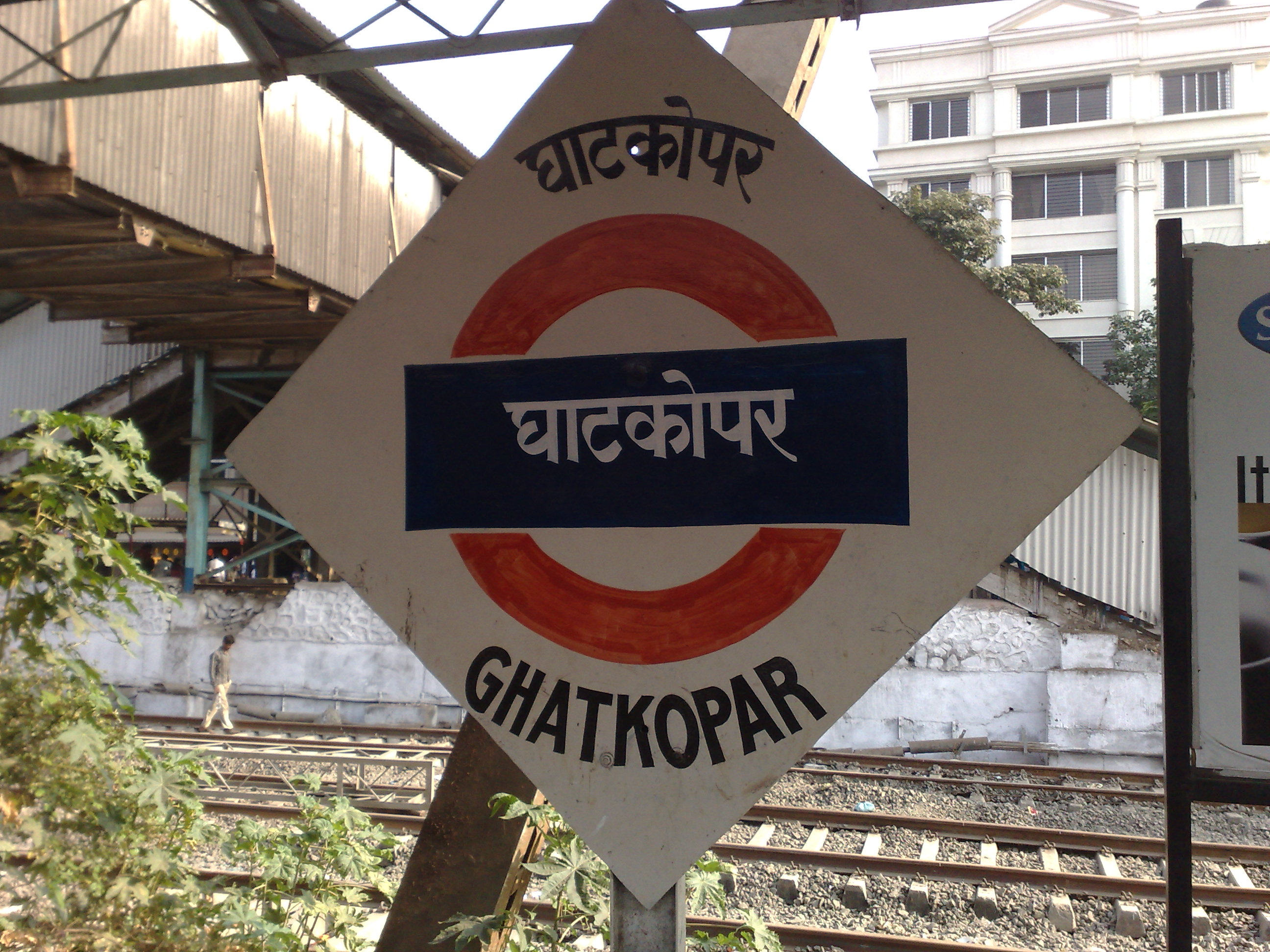

General information
- Location: Ghatkopar,
- Coordinates: 19.0857°N 72.9081°E
- System: Indian Railways and Mumbai Suburban Railway station
- Owner: Ministry of Railways, Indian Railways
- Line: Central Line
- Platforms: 4
- Tracks: 7
- Connections: Blue Line Ghatkopar

Construction
- Structure type: Standard on-ground station
- Parking: No
- Cycle facilities: No

Other information
- Status: Active
- Station code: GC
- Fare zone: Central Railway zone

History
- Opened: 1877

Passengers
- 2012-13: 2,68,225

Services
Preceding station	Mumbai Suburban Railway	Following station
Vidyavihar towards Chhatrapati Shivaji Terminus	Central line	Vikhroli towards Kasara or Khopoli
Out-of-system interchange
Preceding station	Mumbai Metro One	Following station
Jagruti Nagar towards Versova	Line 1 transfer at Ghatkopar	Terminus
Route map
Location
- Location within India Location within Mumbai

Ghatkopar (station code: GC) is a railway station on the Central Line of the Mumbai Suburban Railway network. It was opened in 1877, and serves the Ghatkopar suburb of Mumbai. About 465,000 commuters use the station daily as of 2014. An average of 35,000 tickets are sold daily.

The western side of Ghatkopar station is connected with the Ghatkopar metro station through a skywalk.
