= Pink Line (Mumbai Metro) =

Metro line in Mumbai, India

Overview
- Status: Under construction
- Owner: MMRDA
- Line number: 6
- Locale: Mumbai, Maharashtra, India
- Termini: Swami Samarth Nagar (Lokhandwala); Vikhroli EEH
- Stations: 13
- Website: Pink Line

Service
- Type: Rapid transit
- System: Mumbai Metro
- Depot: Kanjur Marg
- Rolling stock: Titagarh Rail Systems

History
- Planned opening: 2028

Technical
- Line length: 15.18 km (9.43 mi)
- Number of tracks: 2
- Character: Elevated
- Track gauge: 1,435 mm (4 ft 8 1/2 in) standard gauge
- Highest elevation: 38 m (125 ft)

Pink Line (Line 6) of the Mumbai Metro is a rapid transit metro line in the city of Mumbai, Maharashtra, India. The 14.477 km (8.996 mi) elevated line will connect Lokhandwala Complex with Vikhroli and will have 13 stations.

Pink Line will also provide interchanges with Yellow Line 2 at Adarsh Nagar, with Aqua Line 3 at SEEPZ, with Green Line 4 at Kanjur Marg West, and with Red Line 7 at Jogeshwari–Vikhroli Link Road. It also offers connectivity with the Mumbai Suburban Railway's Western line at Jogeshwari and with the Central line at Kanjur Marg. Pink Line is expected to open by December 2028.

== Planning ==
A 19.5 km (12.12 mi) metro line connecting Bandra Kurla Complex with Kanjurmarg via the airport was proposed as Pink Line in the original Mumbai Metro master plan unveiled by the Mumbai Metropolitan Region Development Authority (MMRDA) in 2004. In June 2015, the MMRDA proposed building a 12 km (7.46 mi) metro line from JVLR to Kanjurmarg as part of a plan to build six new metro lines at a total estimated cost of ₹64,000 crore (US$6.6 billion). On 19 October 2016, the Mumbai Metropolitan Region Development Authority (MMRDA), headed by Chief Minister Devendra Fadnavis, approved a plan to build a 14.47 km (8.99 mi) metro rail line connecting Lokhandwala Complex in Andheri to Vikhroli and Kanjurmarg in the east. The line would have 13 stations and was estimated to cost ₹6,672 crore (US$690 million). The detailed project report for Pink Line was prepared by the Delhi Metro Rail Corporation (DMRC) in December 2016. The project was approved by the Maharashtra Cabinet on 24 October 2017.

The MMRDA issued a tender to conduct a detailed aerial mapping survey of the alignment in April 2017. Authorities were to determine the location of trees along the alignment with an accuracy of up to 10 cm (3.9 in), utilizing a differential GPS (DGPS), while a digital aerial triangulation system is to help determine the types of trees, their heights and diameters. The project received Coastal Regulation Zone (CRZ) clearance from the Maharashtra Coastal Zone Management Authority (MCZMA) in June 2017. A 1.1 km (0.68 mi) stretch of Pink Line passes through CRZ areas at the junction of the JVLR and the Eastern Express Highway near Nehru Nagar. The MMRDA utilized a drone to carry out survey work for Pink Line. The drones were fitted with 360 degrees camera that provide up to 3 millimetres (0.12 in) accuracy. The aerial survey takes less time than a regular survey, achieves greater accuracy and helps protect against false claims for compensation.

In November 2017, the MMRDA stated that it had reached an agreement with the Brihanmumbai Municipal Corporation (BMC) to build a 2 km (1.24 mi) section of Pink Line on a common pier with a flyover. The BMC had been planning to build a flyover connecting Jogeshwari West and the Jogeshwari Vikhroli Link Road (JVLR) along the same alignment of Pink Line. Per the agreement, the metro piers and viaduct would be constructed first and the flyover would be built below it. Pink Line forms the top deck of a three deck structure on this 2 km (1.24 mi) stretch as the flyover itself passes over an existing rail overbridge.

In April 2018, the BMC stated that it was putting work on a proposed crocodile park at Powai Lake on hold until Pink Line was completed. The MMRDA faced criticism from Lokhandwala and Powai residents at a public consultation meeting held on 21 May 2019.

=== Alignment ===
The fully elevated line is 14.477 km (8.996 mi) long with 13 stations. The line begins at Swami Samarth Nagar station in Lokhandwala Complex and passes over Line 2A's viaduct near Infinity Mall junction on Link Road at a height of 20 metres (66 ft). Pink Line continues east passing over railway lines at Jogeshwari, Line 7's viaduct at the Western Express Highway, and the JVLR. It continues along the periphery of Powai Lake and terminates at Vikhroli station on the Eastern Express Highway. Pink Line has a total of 50 curves along the route, including many sharp turns. The detailed project report noted that the ground along the alignment was "undulated" resulting in a gradient that was very steep.

Pink Line is the highest metro line in India. The average height of the pillars supporting the line is 16 metres (52 ft) (fourth highest in India), but passes at heights over 30 metres (98 ft) in some sections. The tallest pillar on Pink Line is located at Gandhi Nagar in Kanjurmarg. It is 38 metres (125 ft) in height and is the tallest metro pillar in India. The tallest station on the line is Kanjurmarg at height of 30 metres (98 ft) above ground level.

=== Bidding ===
Pink Line
Civil work
| Package | Section | Length | Successful bid/cost | Contractor | Award |
|---|---|---|---|---|---|
| BC-01R1 | Vikhroli EEH – Powai Lake | 4.772 km (2.965 mi) | ₹444.98 crore (US$46 million) | J Kumar – CRTG | 13 Feb 2019 |
| BC-02R | Powai Lake – Mahakali Caves | 4.329 km (2.690 mi) | ₹372.22 crore (US$39 million) | MBZ-EIIL | 05 Sept 2018 |
| BC-03 | Mahakali Caves – Swami Samarth Nagar | 6.079 km (3.777 mi) | ₹867.75 crore (US$90 million) | J Kumar – CRTG | 07 Aug 2018 |
| Total | | 15.18 km (9.43 mi) | ₹1,684.95 crore (US$170 million) | | |
Architectural finishing works
| Package | Section | | Successful bid/cost | Contractor | Award |
| CA-264 | IIT Powai to Vikhroli EEH | | ₹76.68 crore (US$8.0 million) | SS Constructions | 1 Jan 2025 |
| CA-265 | Mahakali Caves to Powai lake | | ₹124.41 crore (US$13 million) | NA Construction | 8 Jan 2025 |
| CA-266 | Swami Samarth Naga to Shyam Nagar | | ₹165.93 crore (US$17 million) | Landmark – Neev JV | 8 Jan 2025 |
| Total | | | ₹366.94 crore (US$38 million) | | |
Miscellaneous
| Package | Contract | | Successful bid/cost | Contractor | Award |
| MT-08 | Track Fastening | | ₹29.84 crore (US$3.1 million) | Pandrol Rahee | 11 May 2021 |
| MT-09R | Track Work | | ₹80.49 crore (US$8.4 million) | Paras Railtech | 29 Jan 2024 |
| CA-208 | Kanjurmarg Depot Consultant | | ₹20.42 crore (US$2.1 million) | CEG – KNR | 1 Apr 2024 |
| CA-209 | Kanjurmarg Depot Construction | | ₹547.45 crore (US$57 million) | Sam India | 12 Mar 2024 |
| CA-232 | Rolling Stock, Platform Screen Door & Signaling Contract | | ₹2,269.66 crore (US$240 million) | NCC | 24 Jun 2025 |
| CA-233 | Power Supply and Traction, E&M, Lifts & Escalators | | ₹668.15 crore (US$69 million) | IRCON | 24 Jun 2025 |
| CA-238 | Automatic Fare Collection system | | Bidding Underway | | |
| Total | | | ₹3,616.01 crore (US$380 million) | | |
| Total cost | | | ₹5,667.90 crore (US$590 million) | | |

== Construction ==
The DMRC was appointed as the implementing agency for the project by the MMRDA in November 2017. The DMRC invited bids for the construction of Pink Line on 28 November 2017. The work was split into three packages. The first package included the IIT Powai, Kanjurmarg West and Vikhroli (EEH) stations. The second package included the section from Lokhandwala to Mahakali Caves. Construction of the first two packages required the cutting 899 trees. The DMRC awarded J Kumar Infraprojects an ₹867 crore (US$90 million) contract for the second package from Lokhandwala to Mahakali Caves in August 2018.

Girder launching began in November 2020. The MMRDA stated in the same month that around 21% of the total work had been completed. A 29.5-metre tall straddle carrier was used to launch girders for the line. A crane at a construction site along the JVLR near Kanjurmarg toppled and collapsed while installing a concrete girder on 16 January 2022, resulting in the death of the crane operator. About half the work on the line had been completed by July 2022, and 65% of civil works had been completed by December 2022. On 12 August 2025, the MMRDA stated that it had completed building 723 out of 768 pillars (85.75%) required for Pink Line.

== Stations ==
The line will consist of 13 stations from Swami Samarth Nagar in Lokhandwala Complex in Andheri (West) to Vikhroli (East). It will have interchanges with Lines 2, 3, 4 and 7. Stations on the line will be equipped with platform screen doors.

Pink Line (Line 6)
| # | Station name | | Opening | Interstation distance | Connections | Layout |
| # | English | Marathi | Opening | Interstation distance | Connections | Layout |
|---|---|---|---|---|---|---|
| 1 | Swami Samarth Nagar (Lokhandwala) | स्वामी समर्थ नगर (लोखंडवाला) | 2028 | 0 km (0 mi) | None | Elevated |
| 2 | Adarsh Nagar | आदर्श नगर | 2028 | 0.7288 km (0.4529 mi) | Line 2A Lower Oshiwara | Elevated |
| 3 | Jogeshwari (West) | जोगेश्वरी (पश्चिम) | 2028 | 0.9891 km (0.6146 mi) | Western Harbour | Elevated |
| 4 | JVLR Junction | जेवीएलआर जंक्शन | 2028 | 1.598 km (0.993 mi) | Line 7 Jogeshwari (East) | Elevated |
| 5 | Shyam Nagar | श्याम नगर | 2028 | 0.9619 km (0.5977 mi) | None | Elevated |
| 6 | Mahakali Caves | महाकाली लेणी | 2028 | 1.5478 km (0.9618 mi) | None | Elevated |
| 7 | SEEPZ Village | सीप्झ गाव | 2028 | 1.1228 km (0.6977 mi) | Line 3 Aarey JVLR | Elevated |
| 8 | Saki Vihar Road | साकी विहार रोड | 2028 | 1.1363 km (0.7061 mi) | None | Elevated |
| 9 | Rambaug (Powai) | रामबाग (पवई) | 2028 | 1.0122 km (0.6290 mi) | None | Elevated |
| 10 | Powai Lake | पवई तलाव | 2028 | 0.8493 km (0.5277 mi) | None | Elevated |
| 11 | IIT Powai | आयआयटी पवई | 2028 | 1.0644 km (0.6614 mi) | None | Elevated |
| 12 | Kanjurmarg (West) | कांजूरमार्ग (पश्चिम) | 2028 | 1.658 km (1.030 mi) | Line 4 (under construction); Central | Elevated |
| 13 | Vikhroli EEH | विक्रोळी इइएच | 2028 | 1.056 km (0.656 mi) | Line 14 (proposed) | Elevated |

== Infrastructure ==
=== Rolling stock ===
The MMRDA floated tenders to procure 108 metro cars for Pink Line in June 2023.

=== Depot ===
The depot for Pink Line is proposed to be located at Kanjurmarg.
