= Kanjur Marg railway station =

Railway Station in Maharashtra, India

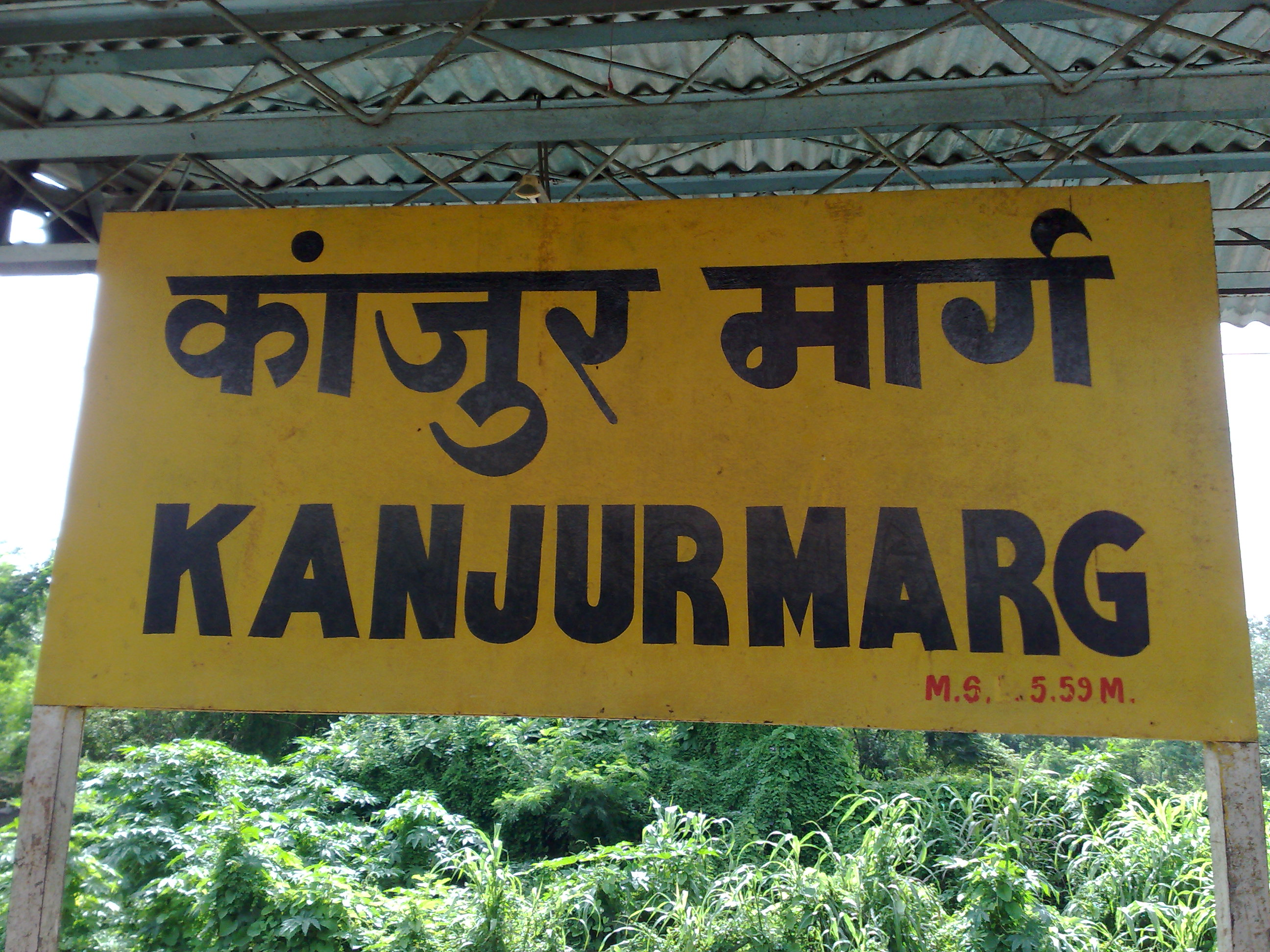

General information
- Coordinates: 19.1283°N 72.9275°E
- Elevation: 5.59 metres (18.3 ft)
- System: Indian Railways and Mumbai Suburban Railway station
- Owner: Ministry of Railways, Indian Railways
- Line: Central Line
- Platforms: 2
- Tracks: 6
- Connections: Line 6 Kanjurmarg (West)

Construction
- Structure type: On ground
- Parking: No
- Cycle facilities: No

Other information
- Status: Active
- Station code: KJRD
- Fare zone: Central Railways

History
- Opened: 26 January 1968

Services
Preceding station	Mumbai Suburban Railway	Following station
Vikhroli towards Chhatrapati Shivaji Terminus	Central line	Bhandup towards Kasara or Khopoli
Route map
Location
- Location within India Location within Maharashtra Location within Mumbai

Kanjur Marg (Marathi pronunciation: [kaɲd͡zuɾmaːɾɡ], (station code: KJRD)) is a railway station on the Central line of the Mumbai Suburban Railway network. Kanjur Marg station is the main access point for IIT Bombay, KV IIT Powai, NITIE, Hiranandani Gardens and other locations in Powai. The station was opened on 26 January 1968 and it is named after the local Kanjur village. It is the closest railway station to Powai which is not served by trains.

Kanjur Marg station is currently undergoing construction as part of the Amrit Bharat scheme, a government initiative to enhance railway infrastructure. Despite the ongoing construction, the station remains operational, and there have been no reported delays in train services new Ticket counter has been made.

== Platforms ==
There are 2 platforms on Kanjur Marg station,

- Platforms No. 1 and 1A are for locals going towards Kasara or Khopoli
- Platform No. 2 is for locals going towards CSMT
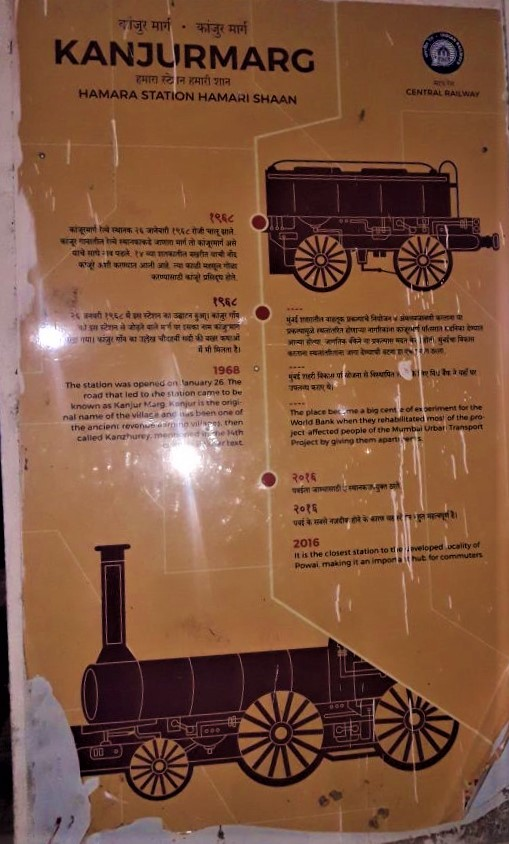
Kanjur Marg station Banner

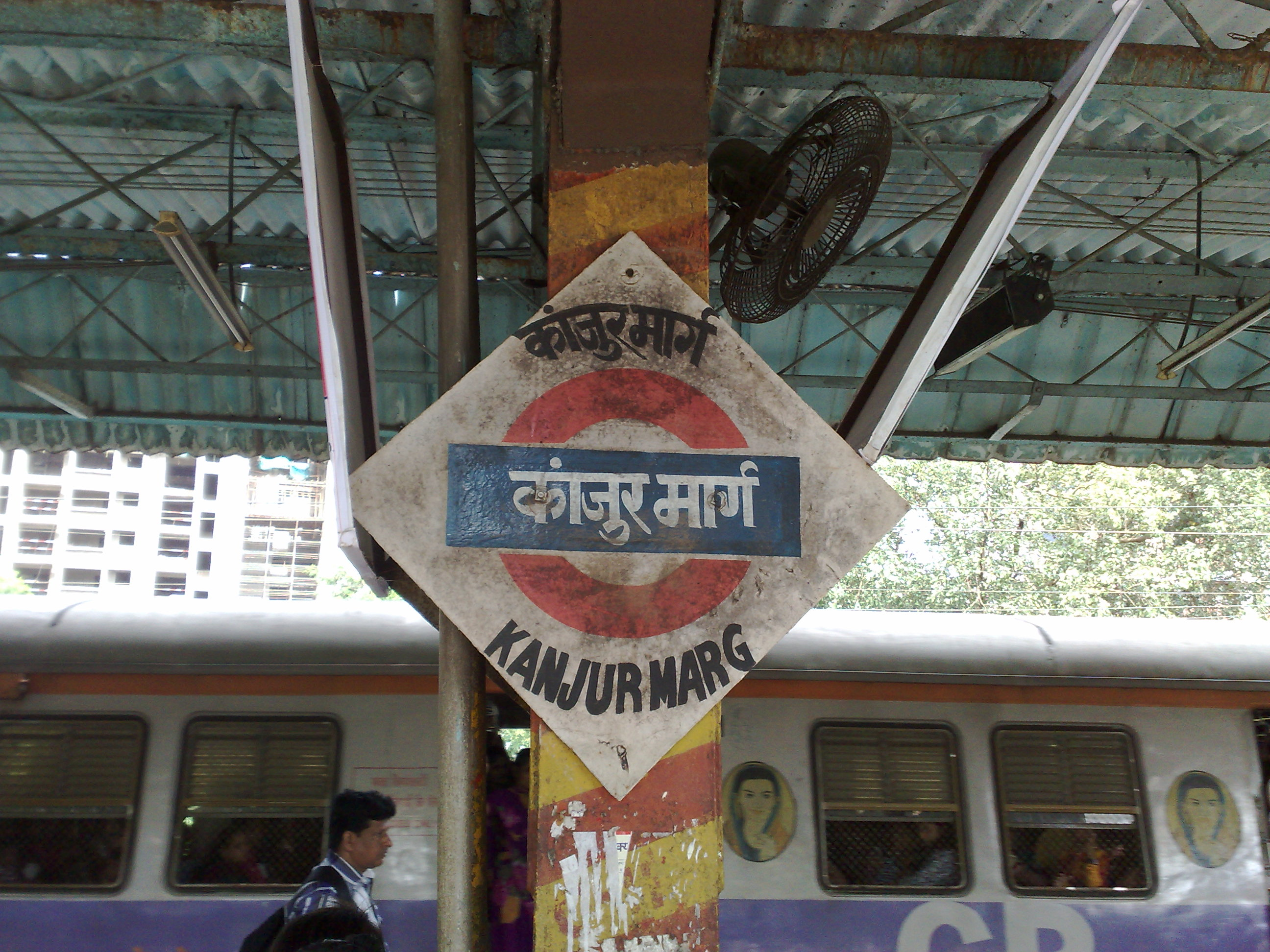
Kanjur Marg railway station - platformboard
