= Chhatrapati Shivaji Maharaj Terminus metro station =

Mumbai Metro's Aqua Line metro station

Chhatrapati Shivaji Maharaj Terminus Metro
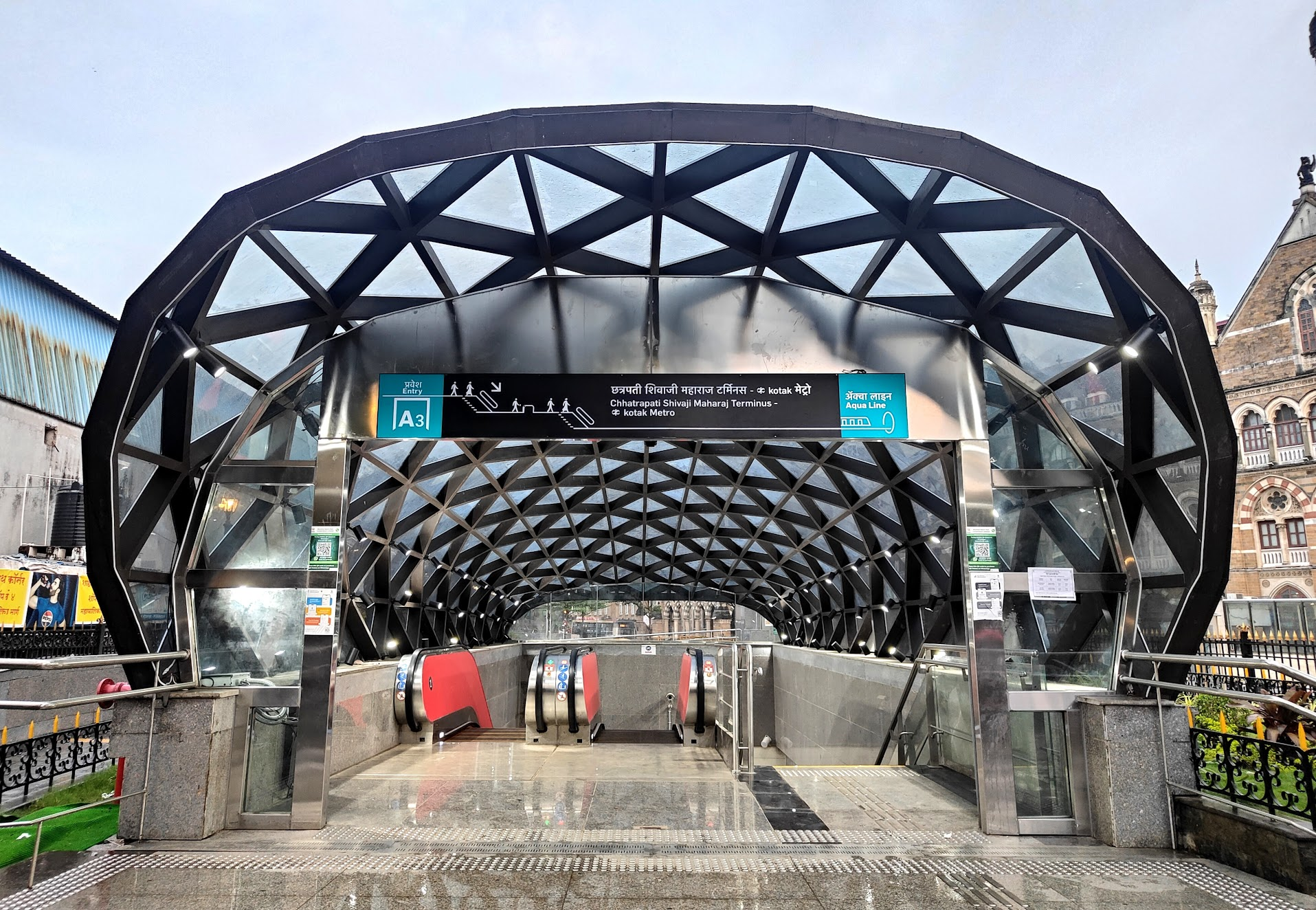
- Entrance A3 to the metro station

General information
- Location: Azad Maidan, Fort, Mumbai, Maharashtra 400001
- Coordinates: 18°56′29″N 72°49′51″E
- Owner: Mumbai Metro Rail Corporation Ltd.
- Line: Line 3
- Platforms: 1 island platform
- Connections: Central Harbour at Mumbai CSMT

Construction
- Structure type: Underground
- Accessible: Yes
- Architect: Ayesa Engineering

Other information
- Status: Staffed, Operational
- Station code: CSTM

History
- Opened: 8 October 2025; 11 months ago

Services
Preceding station	Mumbai Metro	Following station
Hutatma Chowk towards Cuffe Parade	Line 3	Kalbadevi towards Aarey JVLR
Track layout
Location

Chhatrapati Shivaji Maharaj Terminus Metro station (also known as Chhatrapati Shivaji Maharaj Terminus – क Kotak Metro for sponsorship reasons) is an underground metro station located in the Fort area, on the North–South corridor of the Aqua Line of the Mumbai Metro in Mumbai, India. The station was inaugurated on 8 October 2025, along with the remaining section of the Aqua Line from Acharya Atre Chowk to Cuffe Parade.

== Station layout ==
G	Ground level	Exit/Entrance
UG1	Top of Box	Shops, Ancillary Infrastructure, Fire Exit
UG2	Concourse	Customer Service, Shops, Vending machine, ATM, Turnstiles
P	Platform 2	Towards Aarey JVLR (Kalbadevi) →
P	Island platform, doors will open on the right
P	Platform 1	← Towards Cuffe Parade (Hutatma Chowk)

=== Entrances and exits ===
- A1 - Brihanmumbai Municipal Corporation Head Office, Chief Metropolitan Magistrate Court
- A2 - Chhatrapati Shivaji Maharaj Terminus, Manish Market
- A3 - Court of Small Cases, Bombay Gymkhana
- A4 - Press Club, Azad Maidan
- B1 - Cama & Albless Hospital, St. Xavier's College
- B2 - Metro INOX Cinema, Bombay Hospital

== See also ==
- Mumbai
- Transport in Mumbai
- List of Mumbai Metro stations
- List of rapid transit systems in India
- List of metro systems
- Mumbai Suburban Railway
