= Coastal Regulation Zone =

Environmental legislation in India

Ministry of Environment and Forests
- Enacted by: Ministry of Environment and Forests
- Status: In force

Under the section 3 of Environment Protection Act, 1986 of India, Coastal Regulation Zone notification was issued in February 1991 for the first time, for regulation of activities in the coastal area by the Ministry of Environment and Forests (MoEF).

As per the notification, the coastal land up to 500m from the High Tide Line (HTL) and a stage of 100m along banks of creeks, lagoons, estuaries, backwater and rivers subject to tidal fluctuations, is called the Coastal Regulation Zone (CRZ). CRZ along the country has been placed in four categories. The above notification includes only the inter-tidal zone and land part of the coastal area and does not include the ocean part. The notification imposed restriction on the setting up and expansion of industries or processing plants etc. in the said CRZ. Coastal Regulation Zones (CRZ) are notified by the Government of India in 1991 for the first time. Under this coastal areas have been classified as CRZ-1, CRZ-2, CRZ-3, CRZ-4. And the same were retained for CRZ in 2003 notifications as well.

- CRZ-1: These are ecologically sensitive areas, these are essential in maintaining the ecosystem of the coast. They lie between low and high tide lines. Exploration of natural gas and extraction of salt are permitted
- CRZ-2: These areas are urban areas located in the coastal areas. Under Coastal Regulation Zone (CRZ) Notification 2018, the floor space index norms has been unfrozen.
- CRZ-3: Rural and urban localities which fall outside the 1 and 2. Only certain activities related to agriculture and even some public facilities are allowed in this zone
- CRZ-4: This lies in the aquatic area up to territorial limits. Fishing and allied activities are permitted in this zone. No Solid waste should be let off in this zone. This zone has been changed from 1991 notification, which covered coastal stretches in islands of Andaman & Nicobar and Lakshadweep.

== Coastal regulation zone notification 2018-19 ==
The Coastal regulation zone notification 2019 was issued to replace the 2011 notification and develop the coastal region of the country in sustainable manner on scientific principles, keeping in view current global problem of climate change and sea level rise. The earlier notification of 2011 had frozen the floor space index or floor space area which was unfrozen in the latest notification. One of the important development was the division of CRZ-III areas(rural areas) into two categories namely CRZ-IIIA and CRZ-IIIB of which the former denotes an area with population density more than 2161 persons per square km while the later denotes rural areas with population density less than 2161 persons per square km. As per the latest notification the CRZ-IIIA areas will have no development zone (NDZ) of 50 metres from the high tide line (HTL) as compared to the 200 metres as stipulated in the notification of 2011. The CRZ-IIIB areas however will have a no development zone of 200 metres from the HTL. The population density of respective areas will be measured on the basis of Census 2011.

The notification of 2019 also promotes the development of tourism infrastructure in the coastal areas. One of the important feature of 2019 notification is the streamlining of the coastal regulation zone clearing procedure. The Ministry of Environment forest and climate change will oversee the matter of CRZ clearance only for CRZ-I; i.e. the ecologically vulnerable areas and CRZ IV (area between low tide line and 12 nautical miles seaward) areas while for the other two categories namely CRZ-III and CRZ-II (urban areas), the power of clearance has been designated at state level. The notification also proposes a no development zone of 20 metres for all islands. The ecologically vulnerable areas identified on the basis of Environment Protection Act, 1986 are to be managed in partnership with coastal communities and fisherfolks. For the purpose of pollution abatement in coastal areas, the development of treatment facilities is proposed under the regulation in CRZ-IB areas.
