= Azad Nagar metro station =

Mumbai Metro's Blue Line 1 metro station

Azad Nagar आझाद नगर
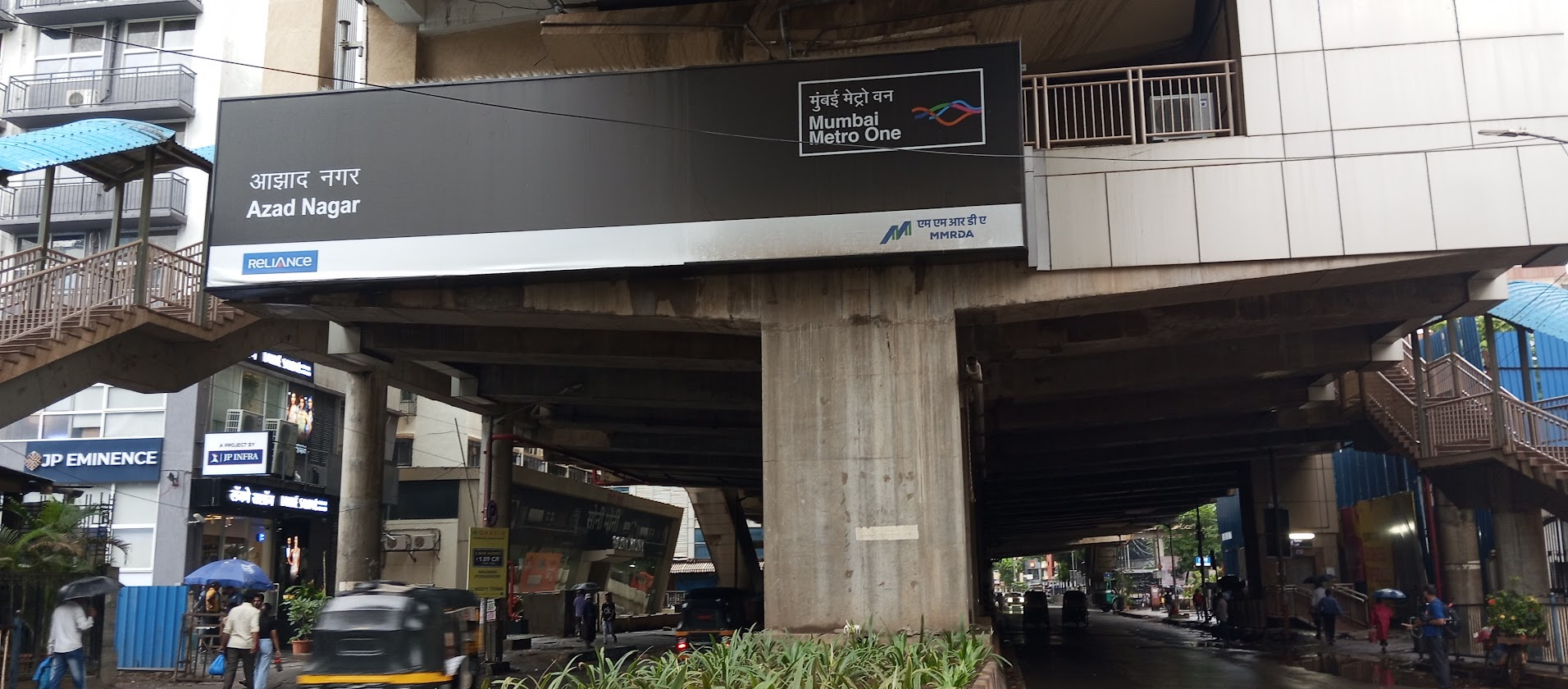

General information
- Location: JP Road, Azad Nagar, Andheri (West), Mumbai
- Coordinates: 19°07′37″N 72°50′16″E
- Operator: Mumbai Metro One Pvt Ltd
- Line: Line 1
- Platforms: 2 side platforms

Construction
- Structure type: Elevated
- Parking: No
- Cycle facilities: Yes
- Accessible: Yes

Other information
- Station code: AZN

History
- Opened: 8 June 2014; 12 years ago

Services
Preceding station	Mumbai Metro One	Following station
D N Nagar towards Versova	Line 1	Andheri towards Ghatkopar
Route map
Blue Line
Location

Azad Nagar is an elevated metro station on the East-West Corridor of the Blue Line 1 of Mumbai Metro serving the Azad Nagar neighbourhood of Andheri in Mumbai, India. It opened to the public on 8 June 2014.

== Station layout ==
2nd Floor	Side platform
2nd Floor	Platform 1	towards Ghatkopar (Andheri) →
2nd Floor	Platform 2	← towards Versova (D N Nagar)
2nd Floor	Side platform
1st Floor	Mezzanine	Fare control, station agent, Metro Card vending machines, crossover
Ground	Street level	Exit/Entrance

== Connections ==
The station is located near the Mumbai Football Arena.

== Entrances and exits ==
- 1 - Near Andheri Sports Complex
- 2 - Veera Desai Rd
- 3 - Towards Amboli
- 4 - Towards Bhavan's College, Near Mao Resataurant
- 5 - Near Sony Mony Shop
- 6 -

== Gallery ==
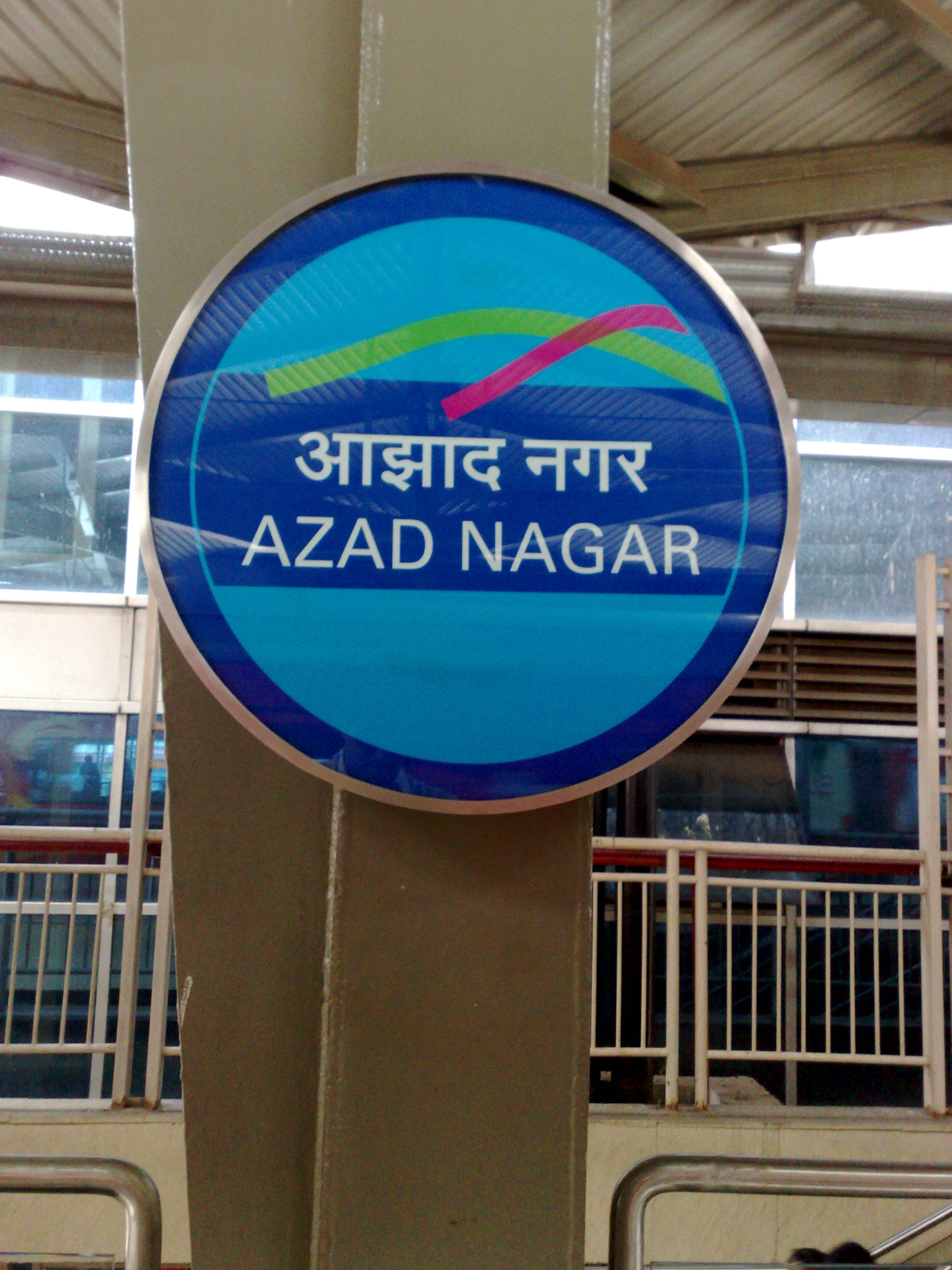

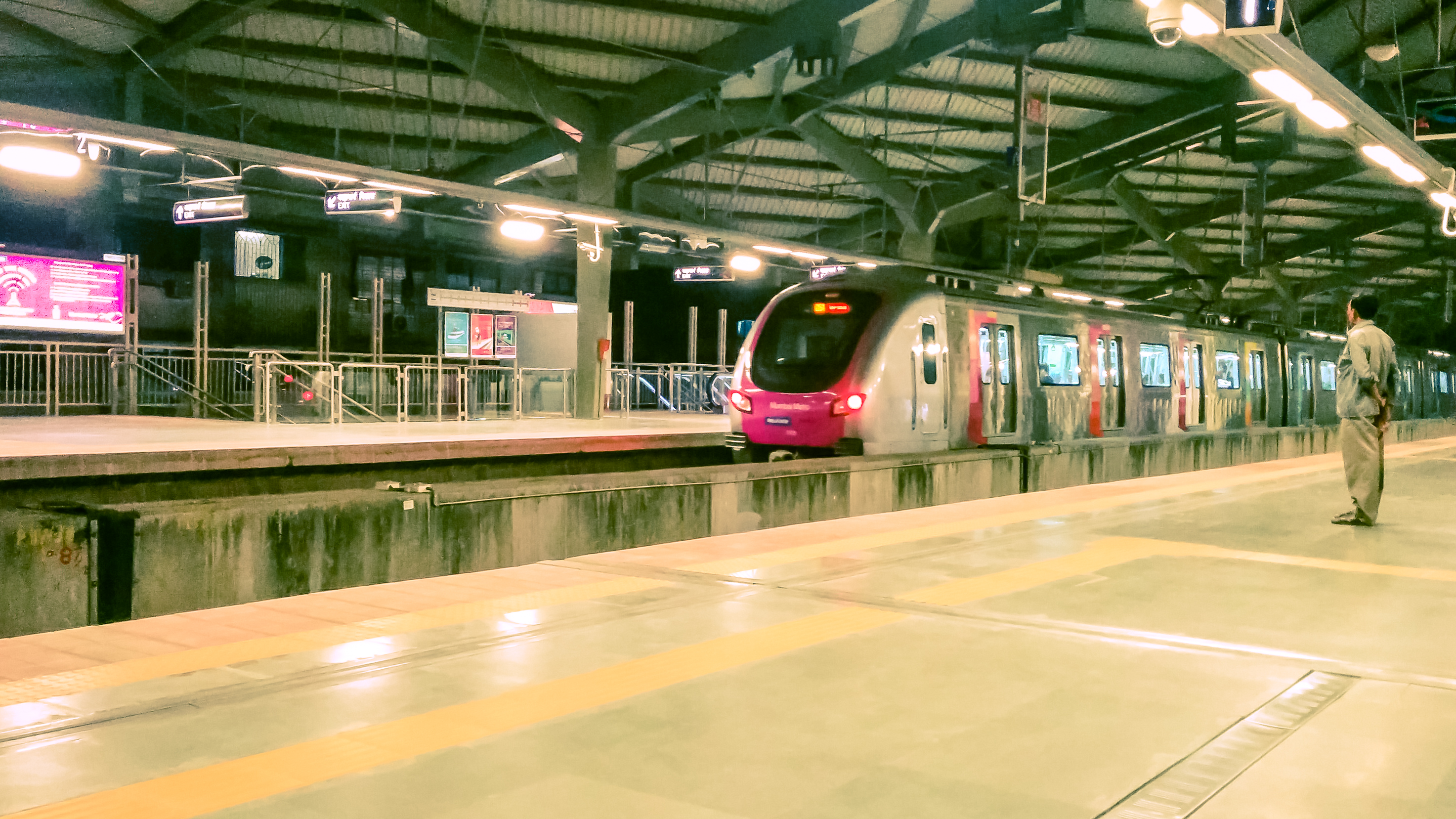
Mumbai Metro train arriving at Azad Nagar

== See also ==
- Public transport in Mumbai
- List of Mumbai Metro stations
- List of rapid transit systems in India
- List of Metro Systems
