= Western Express Highway metro station =

Mumbai Metro One rapid transit station

Western Express Highway पश्चिम द्रुतगती महामार्ग
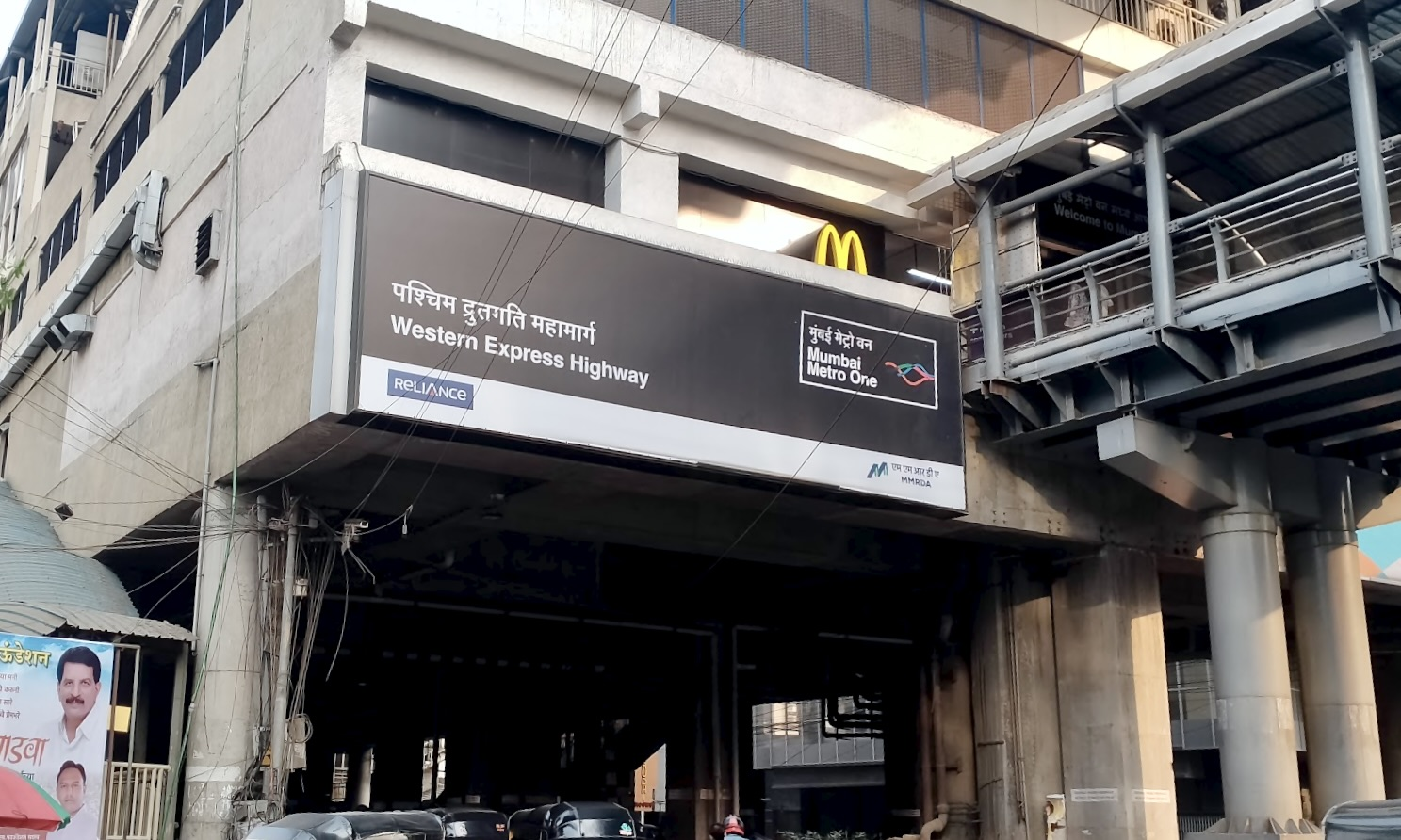
- Western Express Highway metro station in January 2024

General information
- Location: Andheri-Kurla Road, next to Andheri Flyover, Andheri (E), Mumbai - 400069
- Coordinates: 19°6′56″N 72°51′23″E
- Operator: Mumbai Metro One Pvt Ltd
- Line: Line 1
- Platforms: 2 side platforms
- Connections: Line 7 Gundavali

Construction
- Structure type: Elevated
- Accessible: Yes

Other information
- Station code: WEH

History
- Opened: 8 June 2014; 12 years ago

Services
Preceding station	Mumbai Metro One	Following station
Andheri towards Versova	Line 1	Chakala (J. B. Nagar) towards Ghatkopar
Location

Western Express Highway (WEH) is an elevated metro station on the Blue Line 1 of Mumbai Metro serving the Andheri suburb of Mumbai, India. It is the flagship station of the line and was opened to the public on 8 June 2014. It is connected to Gundavali metro station and thus Red Line 7.

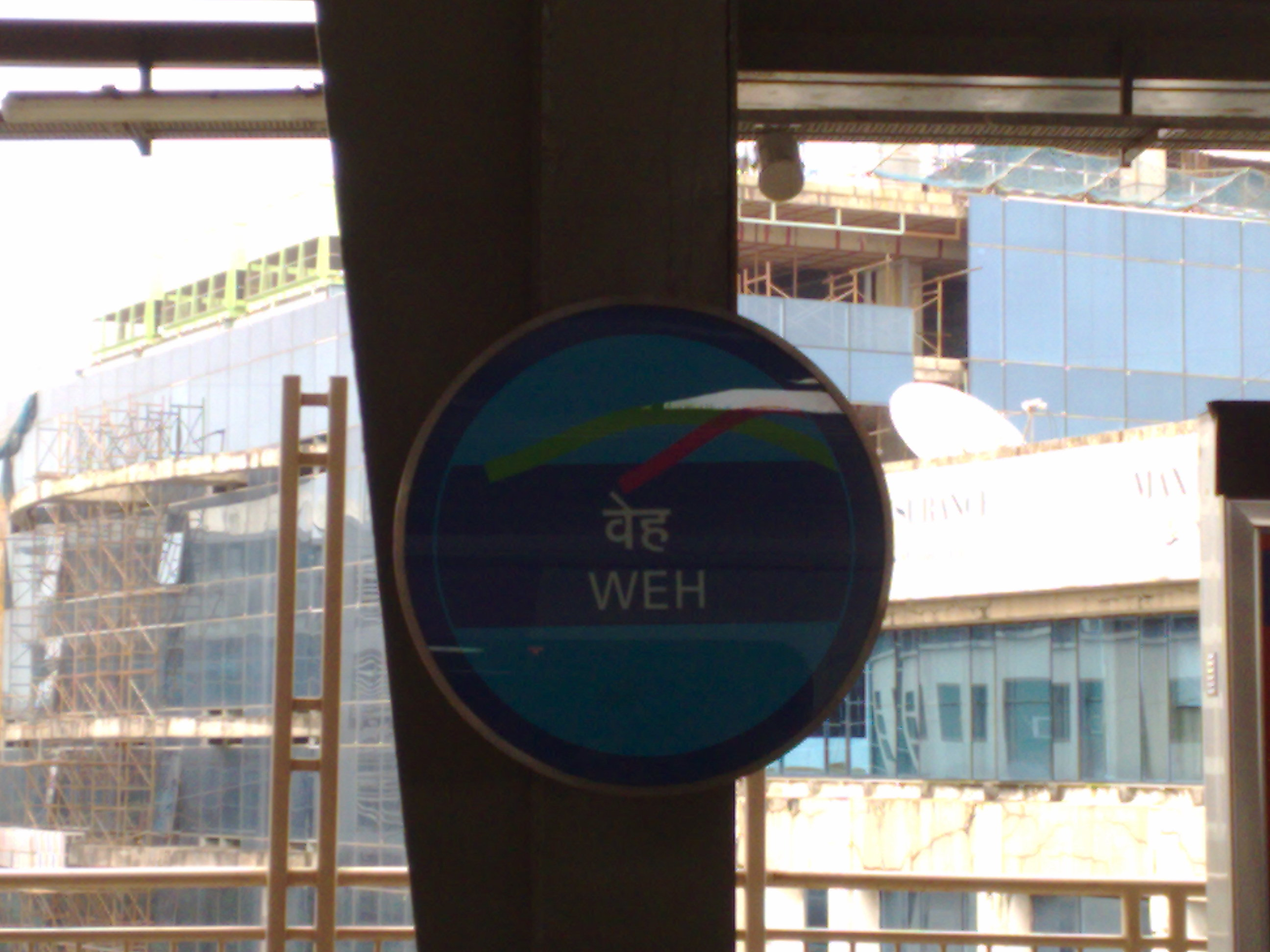
Western Express HIghway metro station

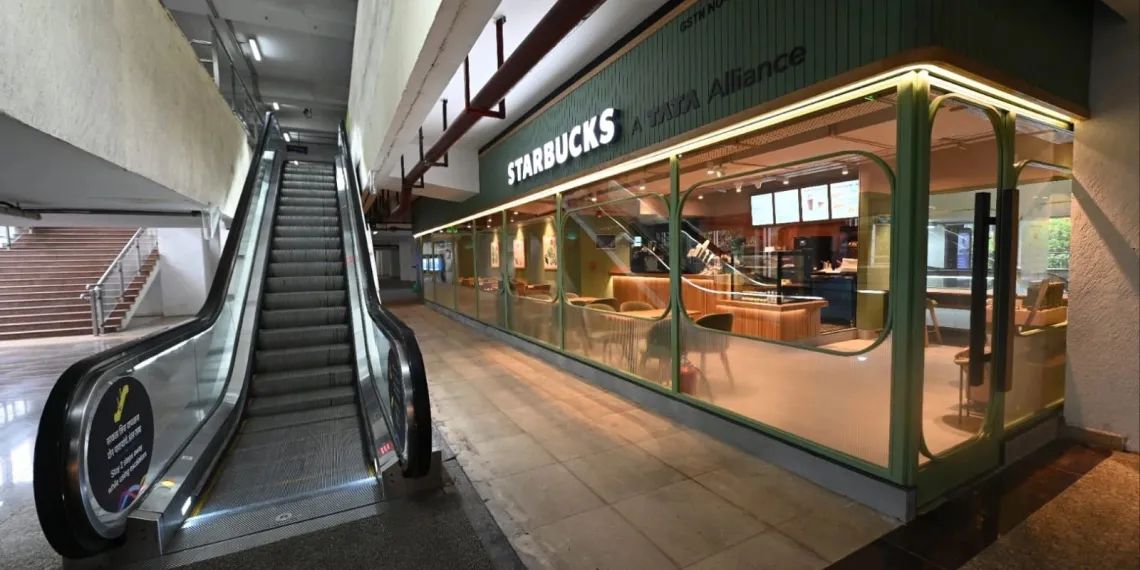
Starbucks outlet opened in July 2024

== History ==
The Western Express Highway station was opened to the public on 8 June 2014. In August 2016, the MMOPL announced that Western Express Highway station would be rebranded as MagicBricks WEH Metro station, as part of a sponsorship deal.

On 29 November 2022, the Mumbai Metropolitan Region Development Authority completed construction of a 58 metre long foot overbridge connecting the station with Gundavali on Line 7. Gundavali station was opened to the public on 20 January 2023.

== Station layout ==
2nd Floor	Side platform
2nd Floor	Platform 1	towards Ghatkopar (Chakala (J. B. Nagar)) →
2nd Floor	Platform 2	← towards Versova (Andheri)
2nd Floor	Side platform
1st Floor	Mezzanine	Fare control, station agent, Metro Card vending machines, crossover
Ground	Street level	Exit/Entrance

== Facilities ==
List of food outlets available are: Monginis, Burger King, Jumbo King, KFC, Warana Milk, Starbucks, Belgian Waffle and McDonalds.

== Connections ==
The station is an interchange station between Lines 1 and 7 of the Metro with a foot over bridge facility.

== Entrances and exits ==
- 1 - Near Landmark Building, Suren Road
- 2 - Near Gurunanak Petrol Pump
- 3 - Near BABA House, The Summit Business Bay
- 4 - Near Mehta Industrial Estate, Holy Family Church
- 5 - Not Operational
- 6 - Near Hotel Laxmi Punjab
- 7 - Near Metro Avenue Building
- 8 - Toward Highway Exit, Maharaja Restaurant

== See also ==
- Public transport in Mumbai
- List of Mumbai Metro stations
- List of rapid transit systems in India
- List of Metro Systems
- Western Express Highway
