= Andheri station =

Andheri station may refer to these train stations in the Andheri suburb of Mumbai, India:

- Andheri railway station, a railway station of the Mumbai Suburban Railway and the Western Railway zone of Indian Railways; formerly serviced by the Salsette–Trombay Railway
- Andheri metro station, a metro station on Line 1 (Blue Line) of the Mumbai Metro; interconnecting the railway station of same name
- Andheri West metro station, a metro station on Line 2 (Yellow Line) of the Mumbai Metro

== See also ==
- Andheri-Trombay Railway or Salsette–Trombay Railway, defunct transit line in Mumbai, Maharashtra
