= D N Nagar metro station =

Mumbai Metro One rapid transit station

D.N. Nagar डी.एन. नगर
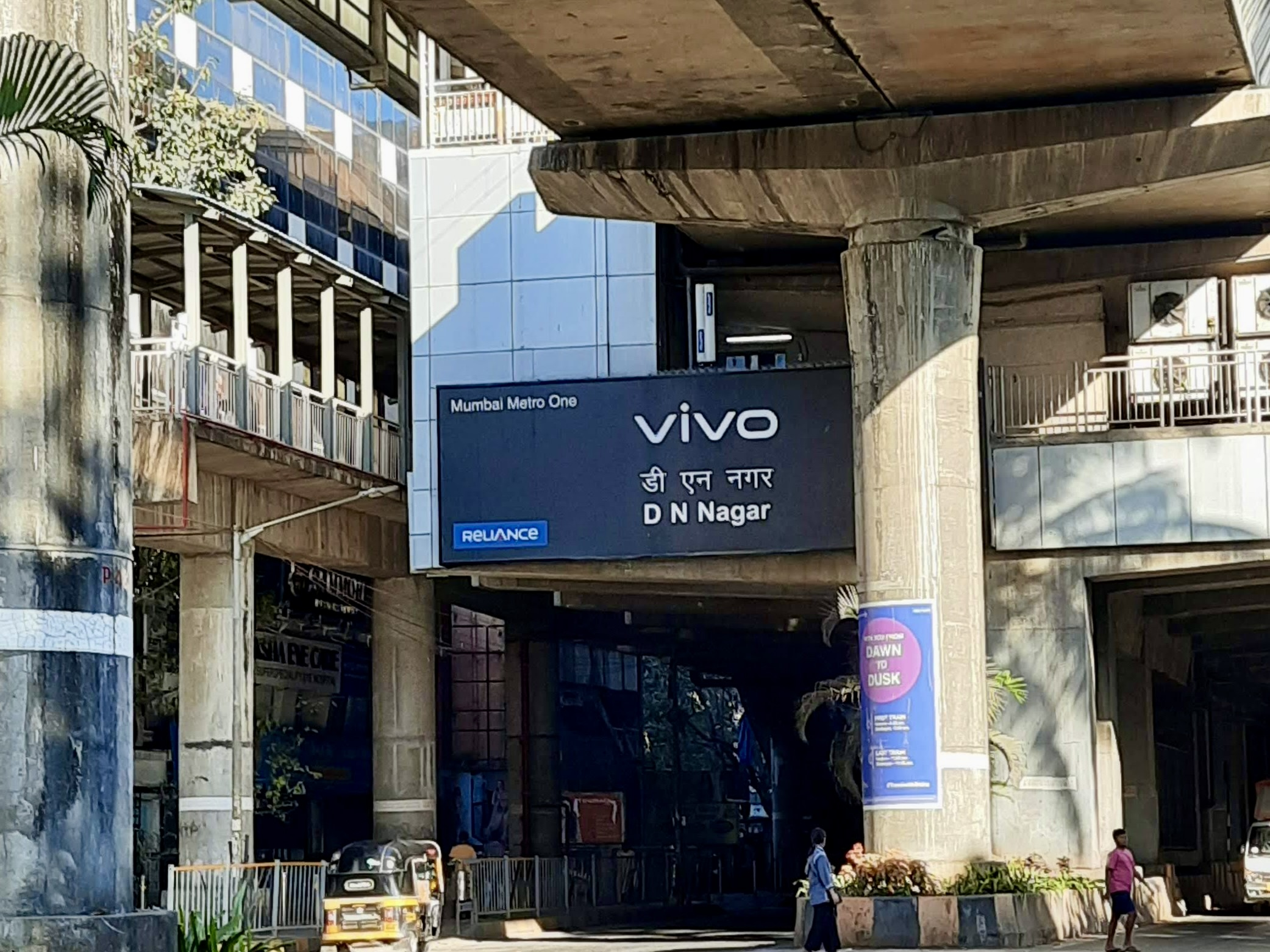
- D N Nagar metro station in February 2023

General information
- Location: JP Road, D.N. Nagar, Andheri (West), Mumbai
- Coordinates: 19°7′41″N 72°49′49″E
- Operator: Mumbai Metro One Pvt Ltd
- Line: Line 1
- Platforms: 2 side platforms
- Connections: Line 2A Andheri (West)

Construction
- Structure type: Elevated
- Accessible: Yes

Other information
- Station code: DNG

History
- Opened: 8 June 2014; 12 years ago

Services
| Preceding station | Mumbai Metro One | Following station |
|---|---|---|
| Versova Terminus | Line 1 | Azad Nagar towards Ghatkopar |
Location

D N Nagar is an elevated metro station on the East-West Corridor of the Blue Line 1 of Mumbai Metro serving the D.N. Nagar neighbourhood of Andheri in Mumbai, India. It was opened to the public on 8 June 2014. The station is located at Indian Oil Junction.

== Station layout ==
| 2nd Floor | Side platform |
| 2nd Floor | Platform 1 | towards Ghatkopar (Azad Nagar) → |
| 2nd Floor | Platform 2 | ← towards Versova (terminus) |
| 2nd Floor | Side platform |
| 1st Floor | Mezzanine | Fare control, station agent, Metro Card vending machines, crossover |
| Ground | Street level | Exit/Entrance |

== Facilities ==
List of available ATM at D N Nagar metro station are

== Connections ==
The station is an interchange station between the Blue and Yellow lines of the Mumbai Metro. A pedestrian bridge connects it to the Andheri West Yellow Line station.

== Entrances and exits ==
- 1 - Next to Westside
- 2 - Near Heritage Plaza, Bank of Baroda
- 3 - Near Link Road, Towards Apna Bazaar
- 4 - Towards Iskon Temple
- 5 - Next to Indian Oil Building
- 6 - Towards Four Bungalows, Gurudwara

== See also ==
- Public transport in Mumbai
- List of Mumbai Metro stations
- List of rapid transit systems in India
- List of Metro Systems
