= Blue Line (Mumbai Metro) =

Part of the metro system for the city of Mumbai, India

Blue Line (Line 1)

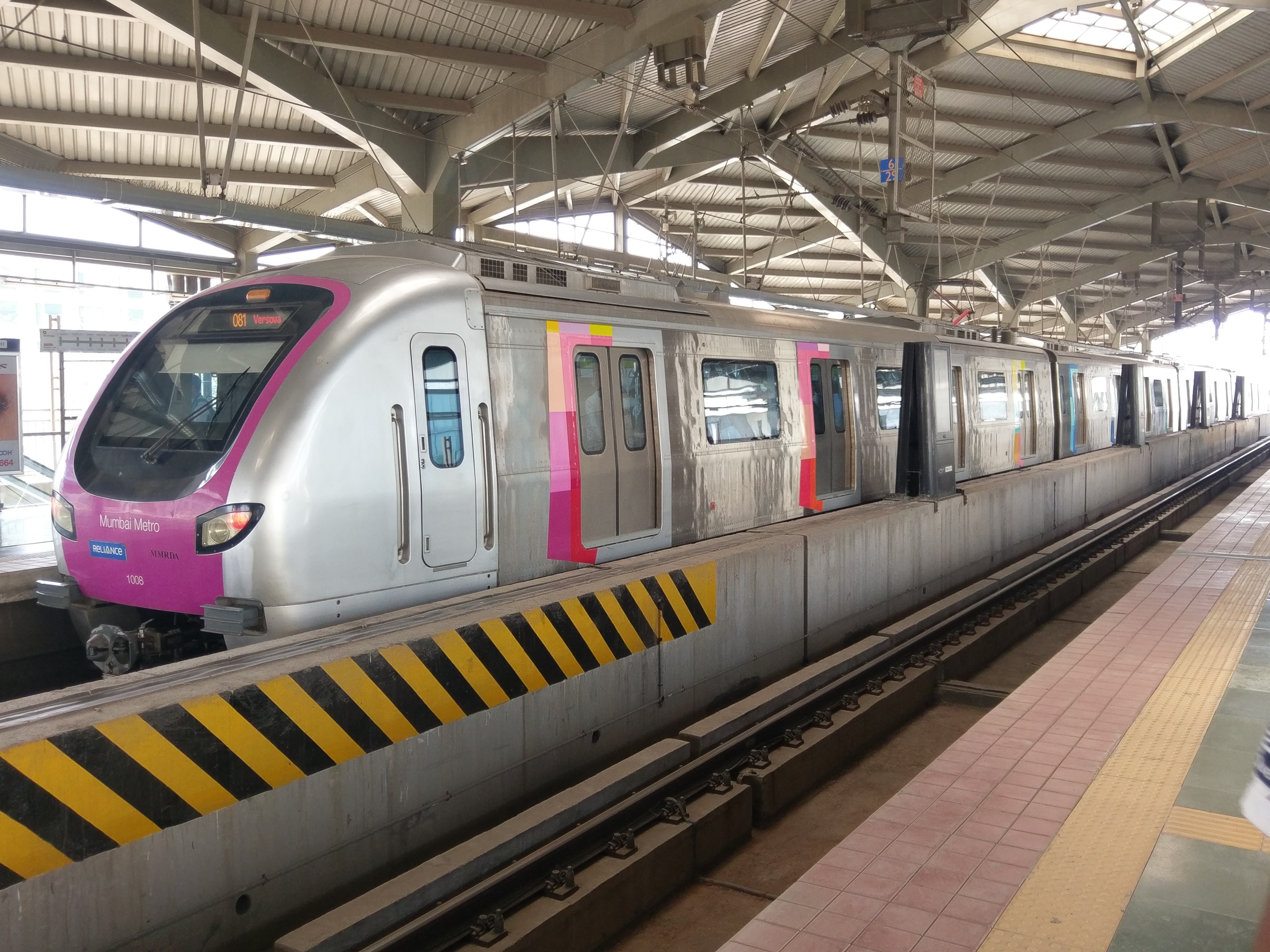
- CRRC Nanjing Puzhen rakes of the Mumbai Metro Blue Line on Chakala (J. B. Nagar)

Overview
- Other names: Blue Line 1; Versova–Andheri–Ghatkopar corridor
- Status: Operational
- Owner: Mumbai Metro One Pvt Ltd (MMOPL): Reliance Infrastructure (74%); Mumbai Metropolitan Region Development Authority (MMRDA) (26%)
- Line number: 1
- Locale: Mumbai Suburban district
- Termini: Versova; Ghatkopar
- Connecting lines: Line 2A; Line 3; Line 7
- Stations: 12
- Website: reliancemumbaimetro.com

Service
- Type: Rapid transit
- System: Mumbai Metro
- Operator: Mumbai Metro One Pvt Ltd (MMOPL)
- Depot: Four Bungalows
- Rolling stock: CRRC Nanjing Puzhen
- Daily ridership: 500,385 (August 2024)

History
- Work began: 2008
- Opened: 8 June 2014; 12 years ago
- Completed: 2014

Technical
- Line length: 10.81 km (6.72 mi)
- Track length: 11.40 km (7.08 mi)
- Number of tracks: 2
- Character: Grade-separated, Elevated
- Track gauge: 1,435 mm (4 ft 8 1/2 in) standard gauge
- Minimum radius: 100 metres (330 ft)
- Electrification: 25 kV 50 Hz AC overhead catenary
- Operating speed: 80 km/h (50 mph)

The Blue Line (Line 1) is a rapid transit metro line of the Mumbai Metro, in the city of Mumbai, Maharashtra, India. The 11.40 km (7.08 mi) line is fully elevated and consists of 12 stations, from Versova to Ghatkopar. The line connects the eastern and western suburbs of Mumbai. It was built at an estimated cost of ₹4,321 crore (equivalent to ₹80 billion or US$830 million in 2026) and is operated by the Mumbai Metro One Pvt. Ltd (MMOPL) on a 5-year contract. This special purpose vehicle, namely, Mumbai Metro One Private Limited (Mumbai Metro 1), was incorporated for the implementation of the project. Reliance Infrastructure holds 74% of the equity share capital of MMOPL, 26% is with the Mumbai Metropolitan Region Development Authority (MMRDA).

Beginning construction in February 2008, the line began operations on 8 June 2014. It has the eighth-highest passenger density of any metro line in the world. The Blue Line has the steepest curve of any metro line in India. There are a total of 64 curves on the line, with the steepest curve being 107 metres (351 ft).

== History ==
=== Background ===
The Government of Maharashtra through the MMRDA, in order to improve the traffic and transportation scenario in Mumbai and to cater to the future travel needs in the next 2-3 decades began exploring the viability of various alternative mass transit systems which are efficient, economically viable and environment friendly. In this context, a detailed feasibility study was carried out under Indo-German technical co-operation by entrusting the consultancy work to Tewet in association with DE-Consult GmbH and Tata Consultancy Services, during 1997–2000. The study recommended a mass transit corridor from Andheri to Ghatkopar as potentially bankable and economically viable, after examining a number of alternative corridors and alignments. This study was updated by the MMRDA in May 2004. Meanwhile, the Delhi Metro Rail Corporation (DMRC) prepared the master plan for Mumbai Metro, wherein they recommended extending the Andheri-Ghatkopar section to Versova as part of the master plan and identified it as a priority corridor for implementation. The State Government declared the project as a "public vital infrastructure project" and designated the MMRDA as the Project Implementation Agency (PIA). The Versova-Andheri-Ghatkopar corridor was chosen as the first line in the master plan to be implemented.

The Mumbai Suburban Railway connects Mumbai from north to south. However, east–west connectivity is poor. The Versova-Ghatkopar route had no suburban rail link and was serviced by either BEST buses, autos or taxis. Blue Line provides east–west rail connectivity between the Eastern and Western suburbs of Mumbai. It facilitates interchange between the Mumbai Suburban Railway and Mumbai Metro at Andheri and Ghatkopar stations. The line significantly reduces the journey time from Versova to Ghatkopar from 90–120 minutes to 21 minutes, and bypasses about 45 traffic signals. It also provides rail connectivity to the MIDC and SEEPZ.

=== Construction ===
Contracts for Blue Line
Package	Awarded to
Civil Works – Viaduct	Simplex Infrastructure Ltd
Civil Works – Stations	Sew Infrastructure Ltd
Civil Works – Special Bridges	Sew Infrastructure Ltd
Civil Works – Depot Earthworks	Shyam Narayan & Bros
Rolling stock	CSR Puzhen
Signalling system	Siemens
Power Supply Traction & SCADA	ABB
E&M	ABB
Communication system	Thales
Trackwork	VNC Rail One
Automatic Fare Collection	Indra Sistemas
Escalators	Schindler
Elevators	OTIS
Depot Machinery & Plant	Awarded to various suppliers
Depot Civil Works	Ahluwalia Contracts (India) Ltd.

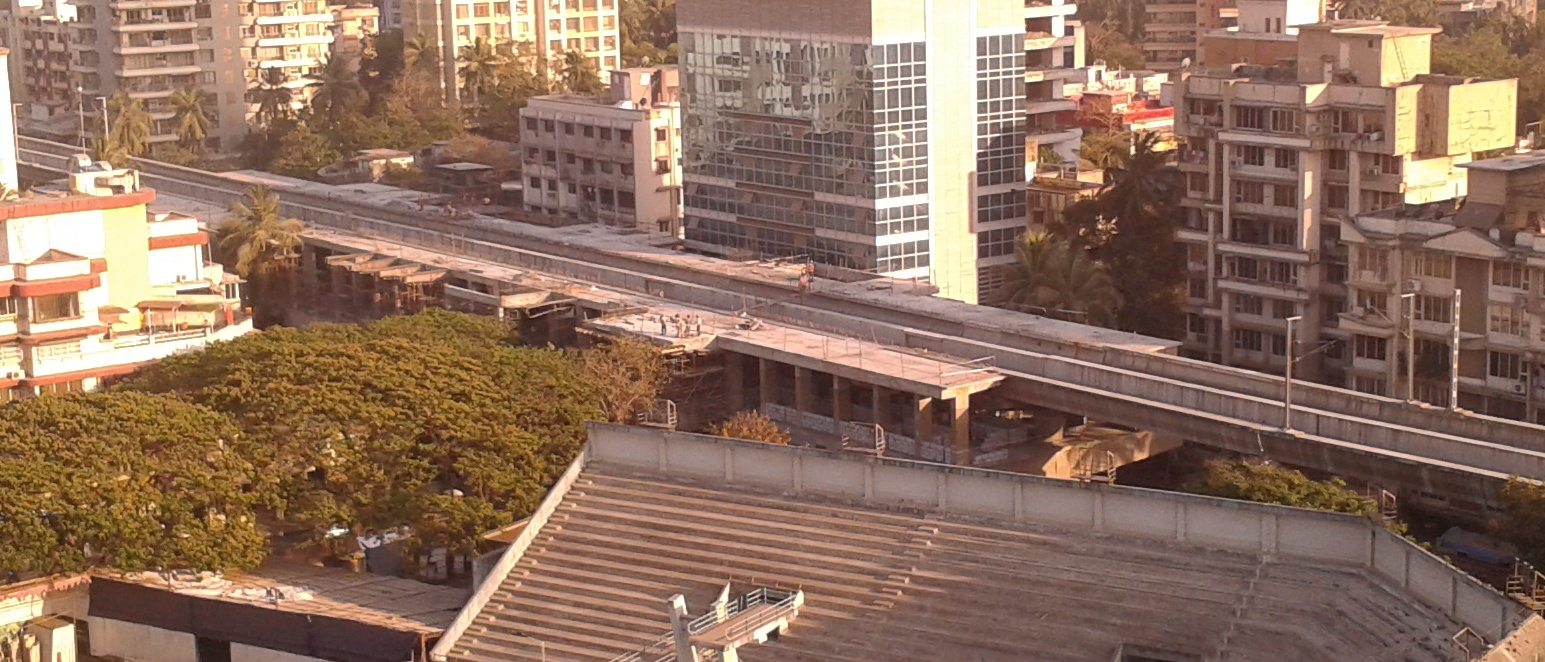
Azad Nagar station under construction in Andheri in March 2012

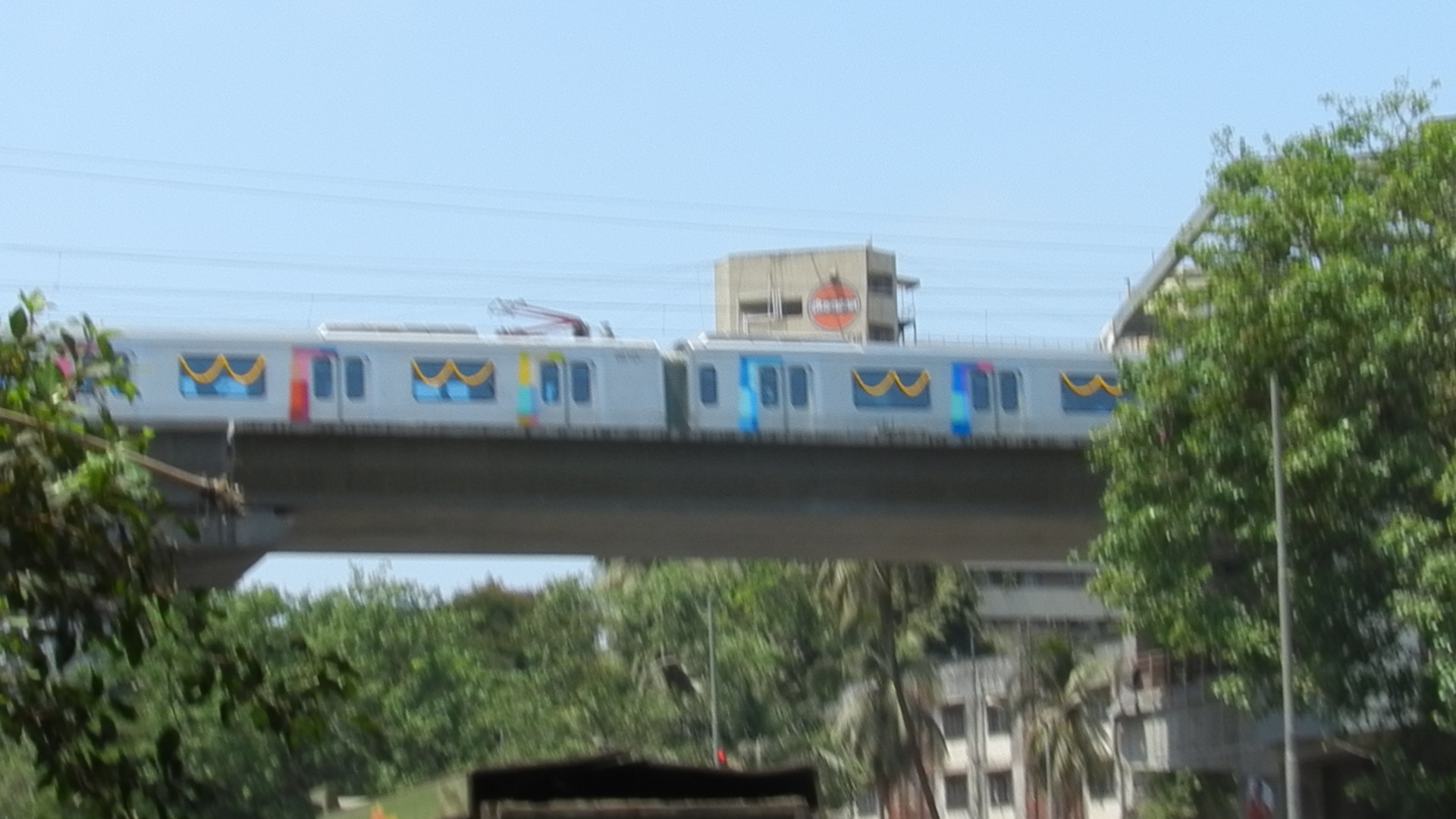
A metro train arriving at the D.N. Nagar station during the trial run in May 2013

The concession agreement for the Versova–Andheri–Ghatkopar corridor was signed with Mumbai Metro One Pvt Ltd (MMOPL), a joint venture company owned by Reliance Infrastructure (69%), Veolia Transport (5%) and the MMRDA (26%), in March 2007. SSRI Creative Infrastructure (Choksi Group) was the main technical contractor. Prime Minister Manmohan Singh laid the foundation stone on 21 June 2006. The work order for the project was issued on 21 January 2008, and work began on 8 February 2008. In September 2011, MMOPL officials claimed that trial runs on the first section of the corridor, the 3 km (1.9 mi) Versova–D.N. Nagar–Azad Nagar stretch, would start by February 2012, with a view to opening the stretch to commuters by March or April 2012. The deadline for completion of Blue line has been shifted several times. The following months have all, at some point of time, been announced as the deadline for completion of the project - July and September 2010, July 2011, March and November 2012, September 2013 (Phase 1: Versova to Airport Road) and December 2013 (Phase 2: Airport Road to Ghatkopar), and 31 March 2014.

The MMOPL blamed the delay in construction on the MMRDA. RInfra officials said that the MMRDA had to acquire land along the route and provide right of way to the MMOPL by December 2008. As of August 2008, the MMRDA had only freed up 20% of required land. The lack of maps of underground utilities made the task more difficult. As per the contract between the MMOPL and the MMRDA, the MMRDA was supposed to hand over complete right of way to the MMOPL by mid-2008. The MMOPL eventually received nearly 100% of the land required for the project in December 2011, with the exceptions of the minaret of a mosque near Andheri station and a portion of the roof of Maheshwar Temple near Jagruti Nagar station that still needed to be demolished. Both impediments were resolved in October 2012 and the MMRDA finally obtained 100% right of way along the entire alignment of Blue Line.

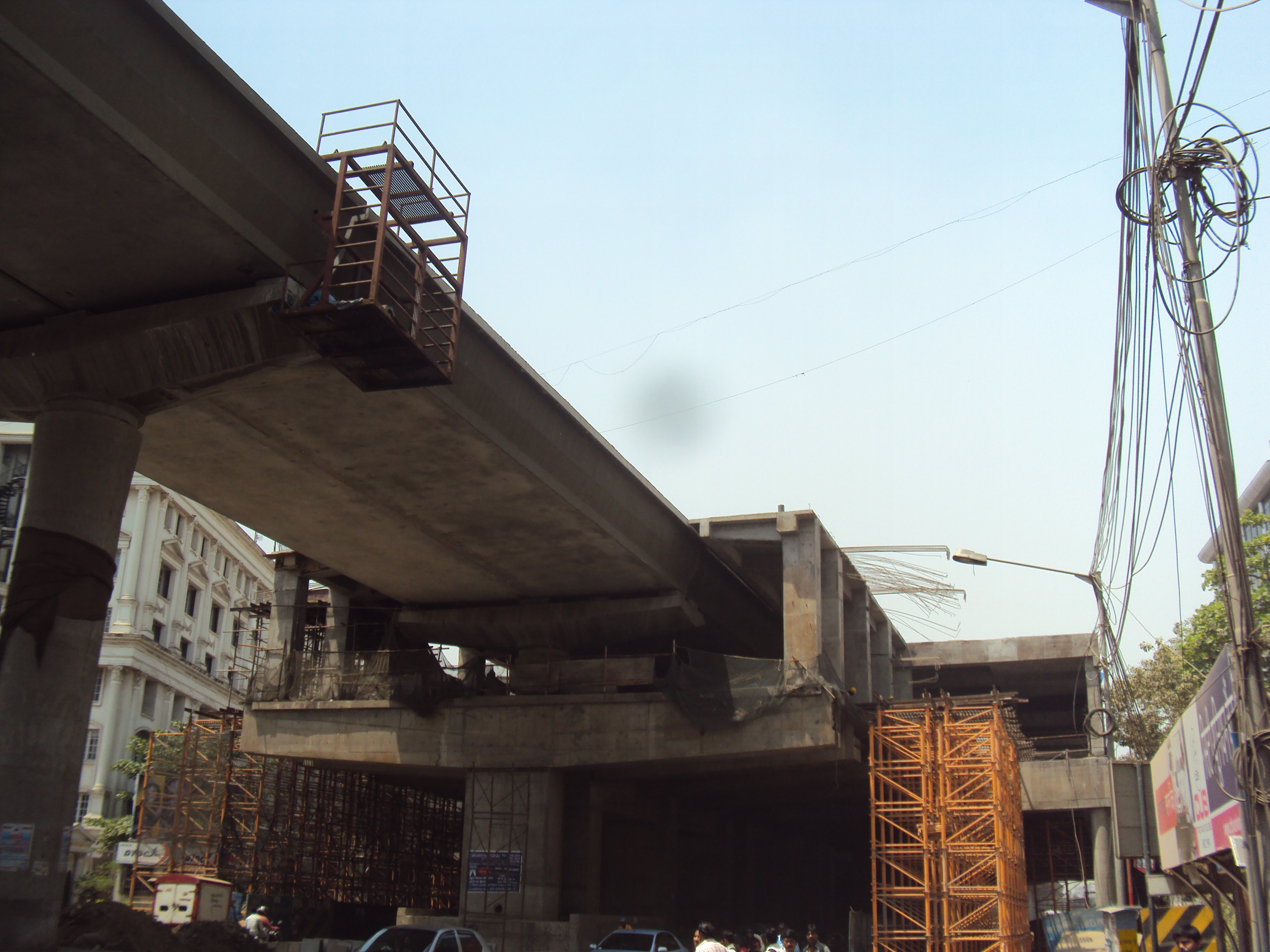
Marol Naka station under construction in Andheri in 2012

By October 2011, the majority of the corridor's track-support pillars and girders had been laid, and the 12 individual stations were 70% complete, with most of the stations rising above platform level. However, land acquisition and right-of-way issues, along with problems with the construction of a Metro-related viaduct, delayed the line's predicted completion to summer 2012. In May 2012, the Indian Bank restructured the Mumbai Metro's ₹1.08 billion (US$11 million) loan account, citing the project's land use problems.

On 1 May 2013, a successful 2 km (1.2 mi) trial run from Versova to Azad Nagar stations was conducted on Blue Line in the presence of Chief Minister Prithviraj Chavan, who said that the line would open to the public from September 2013. However, MMRDA officials told Business Standard in August 2013 that the metro would be delayed further as it had not received approval from the Central Railway Safety Commissioner, and some of the facilities remained incomplete. The first major trial run on Blue Line, began at 6:45pm IST on 3 June 2013 from Versova metro station, and covered the 2 km (1.2 mi) stretch to Airport Road metro station by 7:05pm, according to MMRDA additional commissioner S.V.R. Srinivas, who was on board the train. Trial runs had been conducted for the past month, the most notable being the trial run on 1 May 2013, that was officially flagged off by the Chief Minister. However, trials prior to the 3 June trial, were restricted to the 3 kilometres (1.9 mi) between Versova and Azad Nagar stations on JP Road.

Several tests were conducted before the metro opened to the public. According to the information given by the MMRDA to a Right to Information Act (RTI) query filed by activist Anil Galgali, around 5% of the civil works of the line were still pending as of December 2013. The reply to the RTI query said that Versova, D.N. Nagar, Azad Nagar, Chakala (J. B. Nagar) and Airport Road stations were 99% complete as of December 2013. Andheri, Saki Naka, Marol and Western Express Highway stations were in the range of 95-98%. Construction work at Ghatkopar was 90% complete, Asalpha and Jagruti Nagar stations were 80% and 85% complete respectively.

The MMRDA sent a letter to RInfra on 31 December 2013, asking them to change the name of the metro system from Reliance Metro to Mumbai Metro. The MMRDA pointed out that the original concession agreement said that the project would be named as the Mumbai Metro. RInfra issued a press statement on 2 January 2014, blaming the MMRDA for having "failed to provide any guidance on this subject during the bidding stage and/or during the implementation stage". Republican Party of India (A) workers protested the name Reliance Metro on 8 January 2014 by blackening boards with Reliance's logo at Chakala (J. B. Nagar) metro station. On 11 January, Shiv Sena MLA Subhash Desai sent a letter to Chief Minister Chavan opposing the Reliance Metro name, and expressing support for the name Mumbai Metro. In February 2014, U.P.S. Madan, metropolitan commissioner of MMRDA, confirmed that RInfra had agreed to rename the project as Mumbai Metro from Reliance Metro. However, even by April 2014, the Reliance Metro logos that had been stuck on trains and stations had not been removed. MMOPL officials said that they had not yet received any new logo design, and were still awaiting the same. On 30 April 2014 The MMOPL unveiled a new logo, which uses the name "Mumbai Metro" but also includes the MMRDA and Reliance Infrastructure. The new name was also confirmed by Chavan at a press conference at Vidhan Bhawan on 14 June 2014. When asked about RInfra posting its "Reliance Metro" branding at some metro stations, he said, "It is 'Mumbai Metro' and we will ensure that it remains the same in future also".

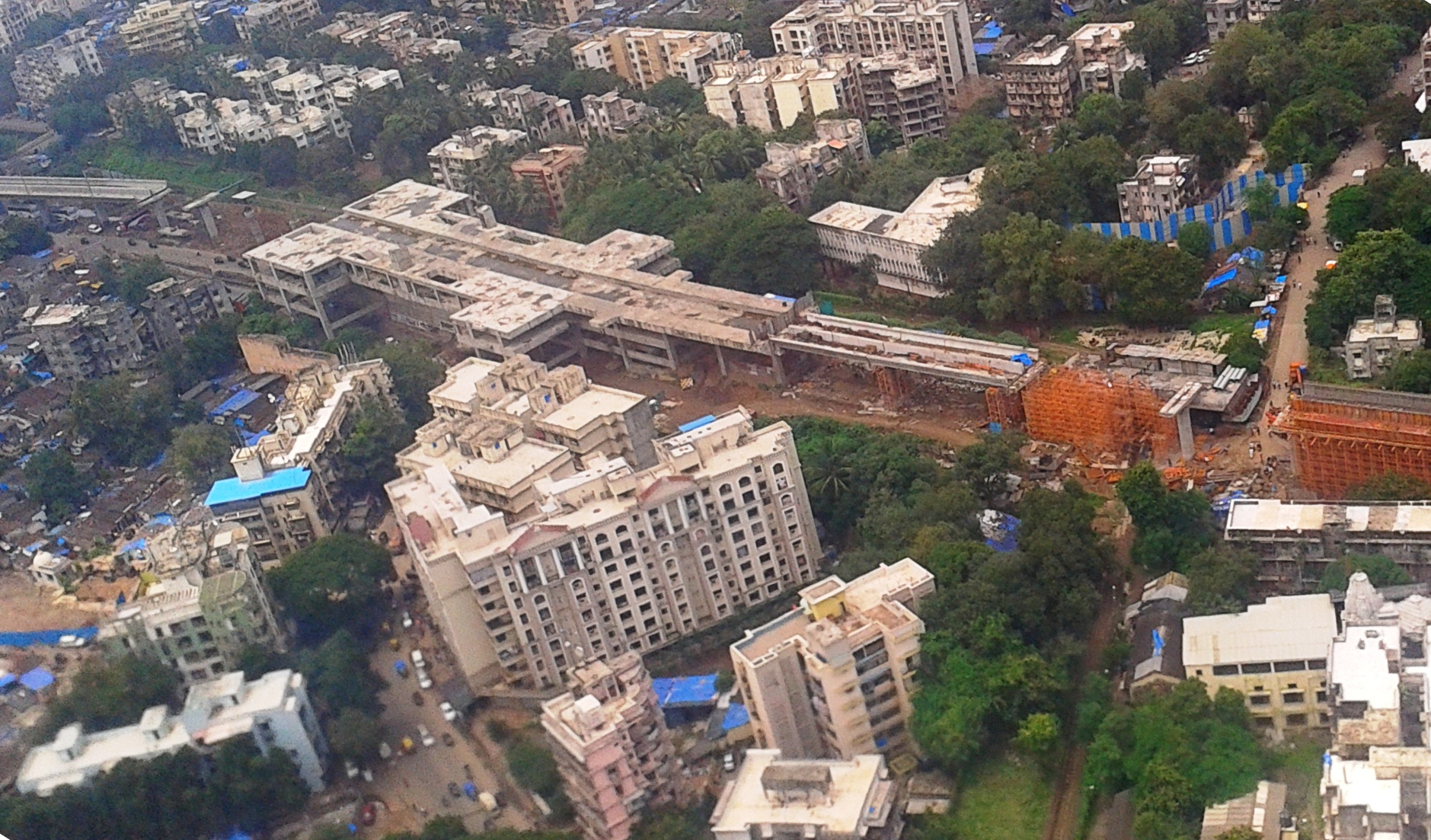
Jagruti Nagar station under construction in Ghatkopar in 2012

On 6 February 2014, RInfra announced that construction was complete, and that some of the regulatory approvals were in place. However, the construction of approach roads to stations such as Jagruti Nagar and Asalpha Road had not been completed, although this work was to be undertaken by the MMRDA, and not MMOPL. A comprehensive fire drill was undertaken by the Fire Brigade, Mumbai Police, and MMOPL in March 2014. During trials in mid-March 2014, the Mumbai Metro ran trains at a headway of almost 4 minutes.

Oscillation trials were completed in early 2014. However, the submission of the report by the RDSO to the Chief Commissioner of Railway Safety was delayed a public interest litigation (PIL) filed in Maharashtra High Court on the height of Mumbai Suburban Railway station platforms. The RDSO had to divert its resources to inspecting the suburban railway platforms, because passengers were falling into the gap between the platform and the trains. The MMOPL was granted a "speed certificate" from the RDSO on 2 April. MMRDA and MMOPL authorities jointly applied to the CMRS for safety certification on 4 April.

Then CMRS for the western circle P.S. Baghel began physically inspecting the line on 18 April, and completed it on 28 April. The CMRS required certain minor improvements to access areas before the metro could begin operations. The CMRS also said that he would travel to Lucknow to discuss the inspection with RDSO officials and then cross check all the other necessary approvals, including rolling stocks, from the Railway Board. The line received safety clearance from the CMRS on 2 May 2014.

The Congress-NCP government had wanted to open the line by 24 April 2014, the voting day in Mumbai for the 2014 general elections. The MMRDA had to obtain approval for the locomotives from the railway board. The MMOPL approached the Railway Board for approval of rolling stock (including the rakes and wheels) on 22 April. MMRDA and MMOPL officials said that the line would open within 7 days of receiving approval from the Railway Board. Despite the MMOPL submitting the necessary paperwork on 22 April, the Railway Board did not grant approve until late May 2014. According to railway officials, this was because the rakes and wheels used in the metro were "of a new kind, with newer dimensions". Another reason given for the delay was the change of government at the Centre following the 2014 general elections. The newly appointed Railway Minister D.V. Sadananda Gowda gave the final approval on 5 June. MMOPL Chief Executive Abhay Mishra announced on 7 June that the metro would open the following day.

A key proposal of the Station Area Traffic Improvement Scheme (SATIS) was the integration of the metro rail system with the BEST. The BEST and the BMC jointly worked towards relocating existing bus stops. BEST bus feeder routes were created along the metro corridor. Bus stops have electronic indicators displaying the expected arrival time of the next train, and information about bus schedules is available inside the metro stations. The MMRDA widened footpaths below metro stations. Parking for bikes and motorbikes is available at all stations.

==== Accidents ====
Eight accidents occurred during the construction of Blue Line. In total, 2 people were killed and 21 injured during the construction of the line. The first accident occurred in May 2008 when 1 person was killed and another injured, when a pile rig collapsed at a construction site in Andheri (West). In 2009, 4 people were injured, when a steel reinforcement cage and temporary scaffolding of a concrete pillar caved in it Andheri (East). In April 2012, a crane at a construction site in Ghatkopar, veered off a truck and crashed on a portion of the nearby Sarvodaya Hospital. No one was injured as the affected portion of the hospital building was empty at the time.

On 5 September 2012, a slab collapsed at the under-construction Subhash Nagar metro station in Andheri, killing one construction worker and injuring 16 people. Following the incident, construction work on the metro was suspended. MMOPL fined the contractor, Hindustan Construction Company, ₹10 lakh (equivalent to ₹21 lakh or US$21,000 in 2026). On 11 September 2012, MMOPL appointed Geneva-based SGS Consultants as independent safety consultants for the construction of Blue Line. Construction resumed on 25 September 2012, under the supervision of SGS Consultants, after the consultant submitted its preliminary report to the MMOPL. The consultant remained with the project until the completion of Blue Line to help prevent future accidents.

According to SVR Srinivas, then additional metropolitan commissioner at MMRDA, "The accident was basically due to voids in the support. The support weakened due to rain and utilities underneath created voids. So, it was basically due to loosening of the soil due to construction activity and its erosion due to heavy rain that the support weakened. If because of any reason a part of the support settles, stress increases on the staging and causes it to fail leading to a cascading effect".

=== Opening ===
The first metro service was flagged off by Maharashtra Chief Minister Prithviraj Chavan, along with Reliance Infra Chairman Anil Ambani and wife Tina Ambani, on 8 June 2014 at 10:10 am from Versova station. Chavan's appearance at the inauguration came despite the fact that he had threatened to boycott the ceremony the previous day to protest RInfra's decision to raise fares. The line was scheduled to open to the public at 12:10pm, with the first service departing from Ghatkopar station. This was delayed by 10 minutes and departed at 12:20 pm. The train was further delayed by nearly half an hour, as it had to halt beyond the planned dwell time at certain stations due to a technical glitch. This in turn caused some other trains to also be delayed by 20–30 minutes.

MMOPL announced a special introductory fare of ₹ 10, regardless of distance, for the first 30 days of service. The authority also announced that children under the age of 12 years and/or up to four feet tall, and accompanied by their parents, could travel for free on opening weekend. On opening day, the line ran for 11 hours, and carried 2.40 lakh commuters. The second day, which saw the line operated for its entire 18.5-hour schedule, saw 2.97 lakh commuters use the line. Blue Line had transported 1 million passengers by 4:30 p.m. on 11 June or within 59 operating hours; reaching the milestone quicker than any other Indian metro system. In the first week of operations, 21.56 lakh commuters travelled on the line, at an average of 3.08 lakh daily. Within days of the metro's opening, many commuters switched from using BEST buses and autos. Authorities estimated a 25% reduction in BEST commuters along the route as a result of the metro. Ticket sales on BEST Bus Route Number 340, the most popular bus route between Andheri and Ghatkopar, dropped by ₹ 1.5 lakh in the first three days of Blue Line's opening.

=== 2014-17 ===
In its first year of operation, from June 2014 to June 2015, Blue Line transported over 92 million commuters, and made over 130,000 trips, covering a distance of over 1,400,000 km (869,920 mi). The line carried an average of 263,000 commuters on weekdays. The MMOPL earned a total revenue of ₹136 crore (US$14 million), and incurred losses of ₹191 crore (US$20 million). The revenues include ₹13.1 crore (US$1.4 million) earned through leasing station space to 52 stalls across its 12 stations. The MMOPL said that it incurred an expenditure of ₹55 lakh (US$57,000) per day to maintain the system and car depot. On 4 June 2015, metro authorities announced that Blue Line had transported 100 million passengers since operations began.

Mumbai Metro One announced that Blue Line had transported more than 150 million passengers since operations began, crossing the milestone on 26 January 2016, India's 67th Republic Day. Blue Line transported 200 million passengers within 786 days of operations. It crossed the 250 million mark on 11 February, or within 957 days, the fastest time in which any metro in India has reached the milestone.

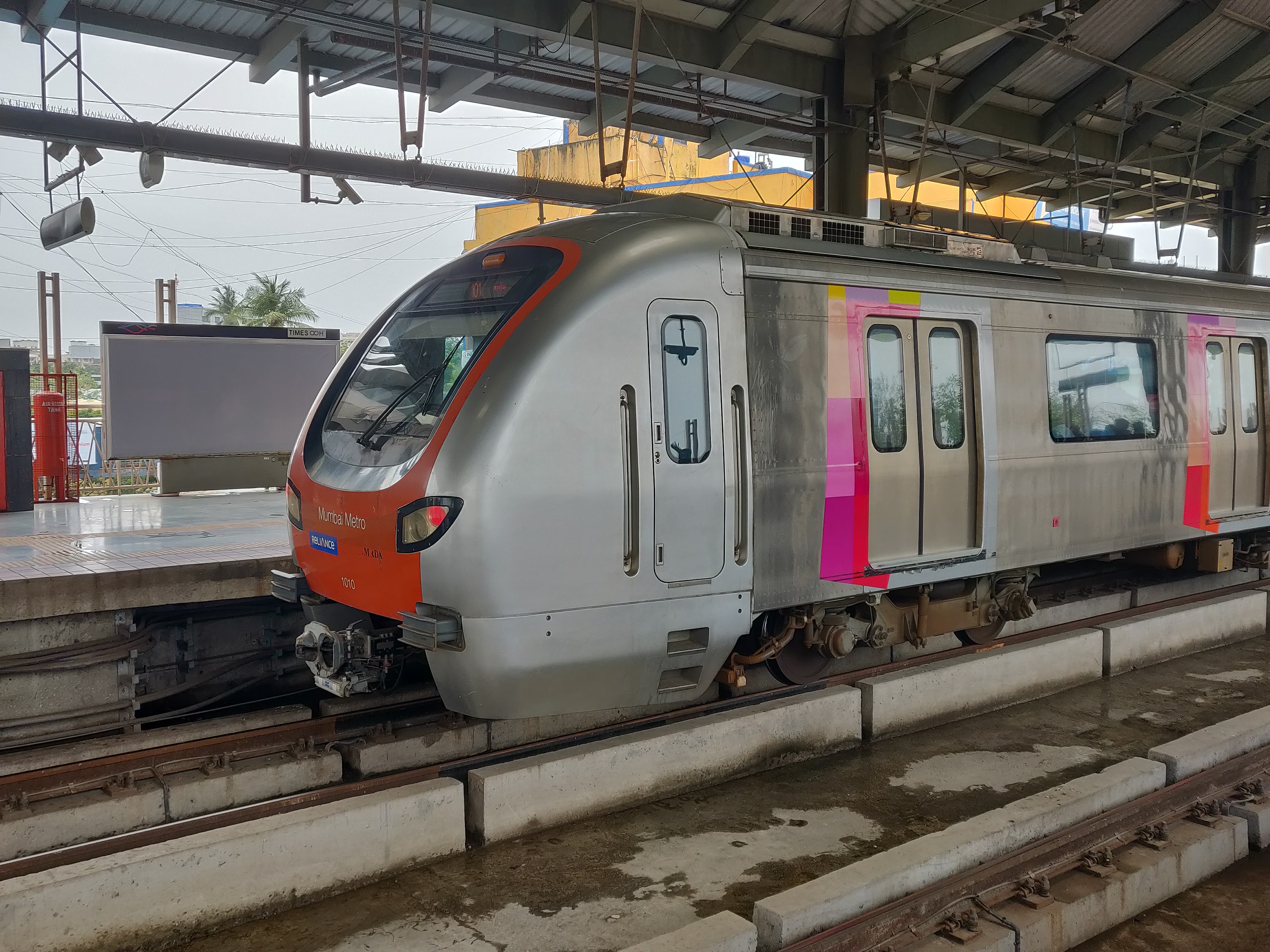
Metro rake approaching Andheri station in 2019

In 2017, Mumbai Metro One partnered with Google to integrate metro details into Google Maps. This collaboration enabled users to access authentic timetables and geographic information for the Versova-Andheri-Ghatkopar route. Trip timings, with frequencies of four minutes during peak hours and eight minutes during non-peak hours, were provided. Google Maps also displayed facilities like stairs, escalators, and ticket counters, helping commuters plan their journeys more efficiently.

== Finances ==
=== Construction cost ===
The original estimated cost of constructing Blue Line was ₹2,356 crore (equivalent to ₹78 billion or US$810 million in 2026) when the contract was signed in March 2007. However, delays increased the cost by 84% over six years, and the project cost was ₹4,321 crore (equivalent to ₹80 billion or US$830 million in 2026).

To offset the escalation, RInfra-led MMOPL asked for a 130-150% increase in fares. An MMOPL spokesperson said, "The principal reason for an increase is the inability of MMRDA to provide 100 per cent unencumbered RoW, which was contractually committed by MMRDA to be handed over to MMOPL on or before September 2007. The increase in fares is necessitated due to an increase in operating costs, owing to a steep increase in all economic indices; inflation, interest rate, foreign exchange, etc. These factors have also increased the estimated project cost." However, the MMRDA denied the request stating that the cost escalation of the project and the fare hike demand were separate issues. An MMRDA official told Business Standard, "There is no question of any fare hike right now, as the issue will be considered after the service is started by MMOPL. The rise in capital expenditure will not impact fares immediately."

MMOPL completed the refinancing of project borrowings, achieving substantial benefits through extension of maturity and reduction of interest costs in June 2015. With this refinancing, the final repayment of ₹1,650 crore (US$170 million) on the loans has been extended to the year 2037. The interest rate stands reduced from 13% to 11.75% per annum, and the average maturity period of loans has almost doubled to 14 years.

=== Dispute over initial fare ===
The state government announced in 2004 that the fare as per 2003-04 levels was fixed as ₹ 6 up to 3 km (1.9 mi), ₹ 8 for 3–8 km (1.9–5.0 mi) and ₹ 10 beyond 8 km (5.0 mi). The originally agreed tariff hike schedule until 2042–43, based on the fare formula of 1.5 times the BEST fare, provided for an 11% hike after every three years. On 6 June 2013, the MMRDA said that MMOPL had asked for the fares for Blue Line be increased by more than 50%, even though the metro had not yet been opened. On 5 September 2013, the Chief Minister approved a revision of fares to between ₹ 9 and ₹ 13. The notification allowed for fares to be raised by 11% every four years.

On 11 September 2013, the MMOPL said that the metro would commence operations in December 2013, regardless of whether or not the fare increase was granted. The Union Urban Department Ministry brought the Mumbai Metro under the Metro Railways (Construction of Works) Act of 1978 on 18 November 2013, thereby granting MMOPL the authority to fix fares. Prior to this notification, Blue Line

was under the Indian Tramways Act, 1886, and the Chief Minister had the sole power to decide fare revisions. In a letter to the state government dated 7 February, the Urban Development Ministry said, "MMOPL can fix the fare afresh after obtaining the recommendation of the Fare Fixation Committee (FFC). However, no FFC recommendation is necessary to fix the initial fare." Fare fixation is governed by relevant provisions of the Metro Railways (operations and maintenance) Act, 2002. The Ministry's notification permits initial fare fixation without an FFC recommendation, but makes it mandatory for subsequent fare revisions.

In an interview with DNA published on 9 May, MMRDA Commissioner U.P.S. Madan declared that the August 2013 fares were final stating, "There is already a fare notification in place about metro, which is final. The notification was issued recently with a revision in ticket prices. The fare notification is final and binding." Anil Galgali, an RTI activist and chairman of the Mumbai-based NGO Athak Seva Sangh, wrote a letter to the Chief Minister on 2 May 2014, urging him to use his special powers to prevent the fare hike. Galgali said, "The Maharashtra state government should use its special powers and stop the new fares from being implemented. The delay in project and increase in cost is not the fault of Mumbai's citizens. It is the responsibility of the Maharashtra state government to act against MMOPL's demands." He further accused the MMOPL of "blackmailing the government and playing with citizens". MMOPL announced the minimum and maximum fares on the line as ₹ 10 and ₹ 40 respectively in early May 2014. However, MMOPL later announced a special introductory fare of ₹ 10, regardless of distance, for the first 30 days of service, i.e. from 8 June to 8 July.

On 9 June 2014, the MMRDA filed a case in the Bombay High Court seeking appointment of an arbitrator for the fare.

== Stations ==
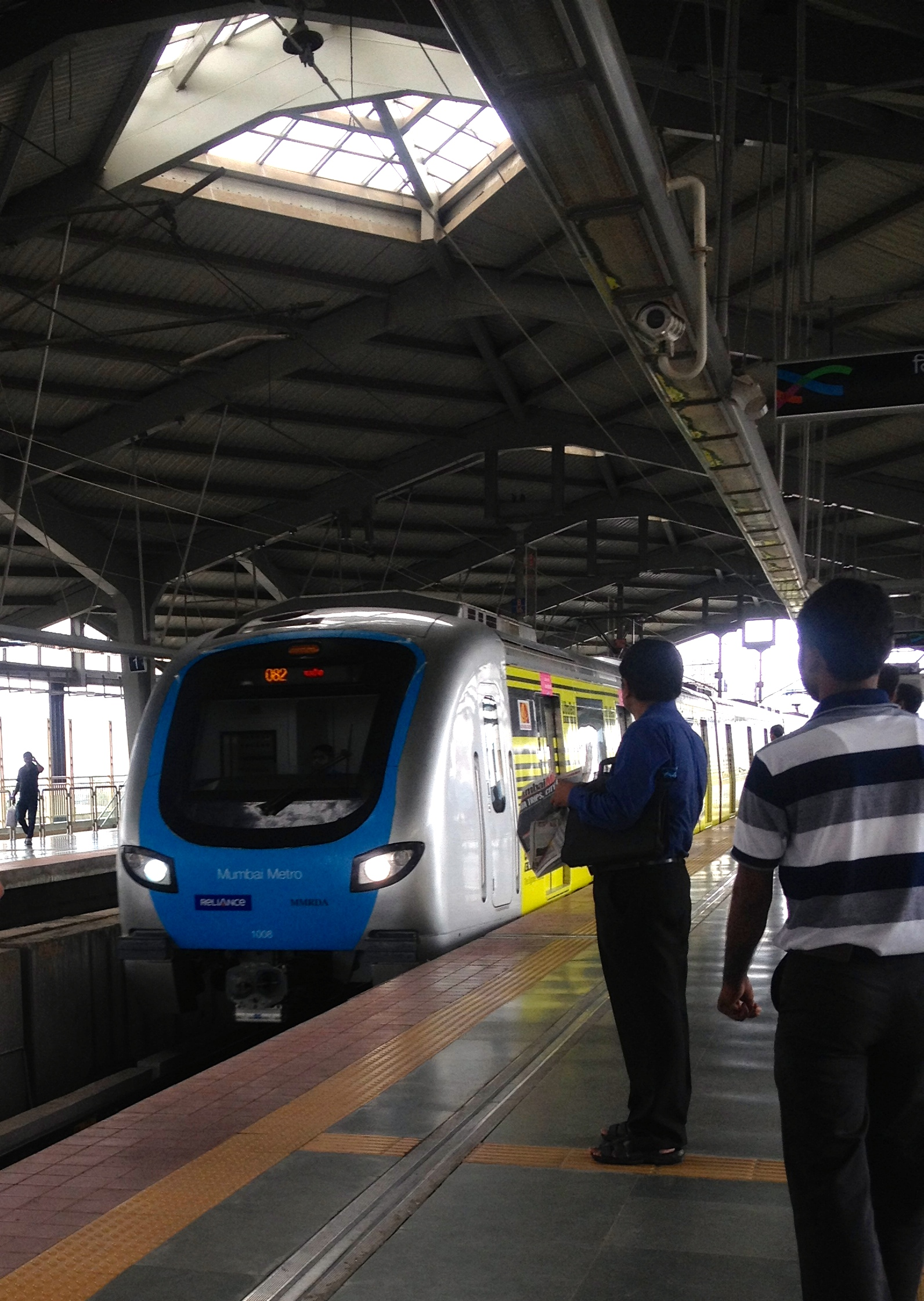
A train arriving at Saki Naka station

There are 12 stations on Blue Line. All stations have three levels that are accessed via stairs, escalators, and elevators. Trains leave from the second floor, which is the Platform level. There is a maximum gap of 85 mm (3.3 in) between the platform and train doors.

There are 100 staircases (minimum 4 in each station), 45 elevators and 95 escalators on the 12 stations of Blue Line. Platforms have polycarbonate roofs which allow them to be naturally lit. Stations feature murals created by university students. Metro authorities organised the "Majhi Metro" festival and requested art and architecture students to enter a contest, where the winners were awarded the opportunity to design and style a metro station, based on the theme "Mumbai".

On 3 July 2013, MMOPL announced that Wi-Fi services were enabled at all 12 stations on the line. The facility is expected to be available on moving trains by the end of the month. You Broadband is the service provider.

There are no parking facilities available on Blue Line. The MMRDA said that this was because there was no space available. The Ghatkopar station is connected with the western side of the Ghatkopar railway station through a 12-metre (39 ft) wide foot-over-bridge.

Under sponsorship agreements, the MMOPL rebranded the Andheri and WEH stations as the Bank of Baroda Andheri station and the Magicbricks WEH station in August 2016 and February 2017 respectively. The MMRDA said that MMOPL cannot re-brand station's without its permission. In March 2017, the Union ministry of urban development clarified that MMOPL was permitted to rebrand stations. The revenue earned by MMOPL through the rebranding is not shared with the MMRDA, nor passed on to commuters through lower ticket fares.

As part of the Station Area Traffic Improvement Scheme (SATIS), the MMRDA moved all bus and taxi stands to a distance of about 40–50 metres away from the stations. The MMRDA believes that the previous location of the stands just next the stations resulted in traffic congestion and restricted the movement of pedestrians. Congestion issues were resolved after the implementation of SATIS at all stations on the line.

Blue Line (Line 1)
#	Station		Opened	Interchange	Alignment
#	English	Marathi	Opened	Interchange	Alignment
1	Versova	वर्सोवा	8 June 2014		Elevated
2	D N Nagar	डी.एन. नगर	8 June 2014	Line 2A Andheri West	Elevated
3	Azad Nagar	आझाद नगर	8 June 2014		Elevated
4	Andheri	अंधेरी	8 June 2014	Western Harbour	Elevated
5	Western Express Highway	पश्चिम द्रुतगती महामार्ग	8 June 2014	Line 7 Gundavali	Elevated
6	Chakala (J. B. Nagar)	चकाला (जे.बी. नगर)	8 June 2014		Elevated
7	Airport Road	विमानतळ रस्ता	8 June 2014		Elevated
8	Marol Naka	मरोळ नाका	8 June 2014	Line 3	Elevated
9	Saki Naka	साकी नाका	8 June 2014		Elevated
10	Asalpha	असल्फा	8 June 2014		Elevated
11	Jagruti Nagar	जागृती नगर	8 June 2014		Elevated
12	Ghatkopar	घाटकोपर	8 June 2014	Central	Elevated

== Infrastructure ==
=== Rolling stock ===
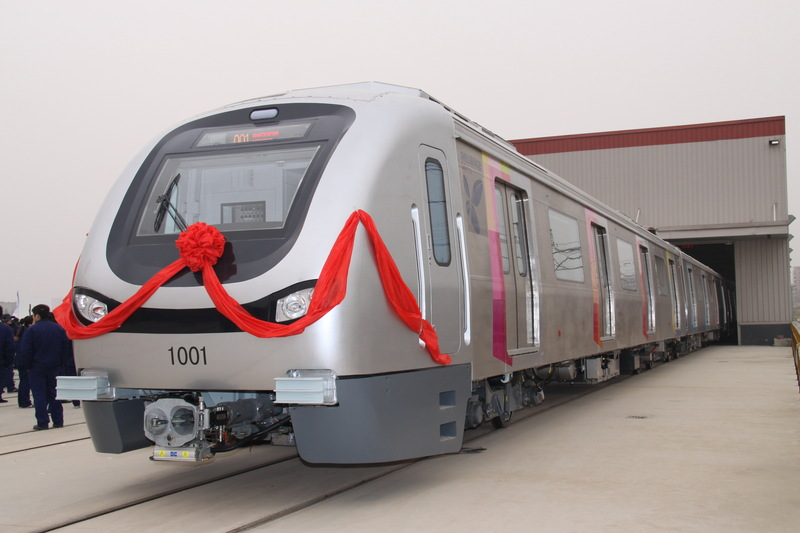
A Mumbai Metro train in 2010

Six international firms - Siemens, Bombardier, Alstom, Rotem-Hyundai, CNR Changchun, and Nippon Sharyo - were shortlisted to provide rolling stock for the line, but CSR Puzhen was ultimately chosen to supply rolling stock. CSR Puzhen was awarded a contract in May 2008 to supply 16 trains of 4 cars each for a total fee of ₹6 billion (equivalent to ₹18 billion or US$190 million in 2026). The first rake was shipped from Shanghai on 23 March 2010, and the last rake arrived at Mumbai port by the end of February 2014.

Blue Line was allotted 64 coaches. Fourteen trains (of four cars) are in service during rush hour, and seven or eight in non-peak hours. All coaches are air-conditioned and have humidity control, and are designed to reduce noise and vibration. Each coach is approximately 2.9 metres (9 ft 6 in) wide and has 48 seats. A coach has a capacity of 375 passengers, and a single four car train has a total capacity of 1500 passengers. The coach body is made of lightweight stainless steel, with fire resistant metal doors. Coaches have metallic silver colour exteriors, and can be covered with vinyl sheets to display advertisements. The interior features anti-skid floors, and longitudinal seats with dedicated space to accommodate wheelchairs. Trains on Blue Line are fitted with the VTS Firetide 7010 video transmission system. Coaches are also fitted with LED displays showing dynamic route map, and LCD TVs for entertainment, information and advertising. Windows in coaches are made of double glazed laminated glass to shut out noise. Each coach has eight externally hung, sliding bi-parting doors except the pilot cabin which has only 2. Doors are broad to enable wheelchair access. The maximum gap between the station platform and the doors is 85 mm (3.3 in). Trains are outfitted with a number of features for safety and convenience, first-aid kits, fire-fighting equipment and intercom systems permitting communication with the train driver. Each coach contains a black box to assist in accident investigations.

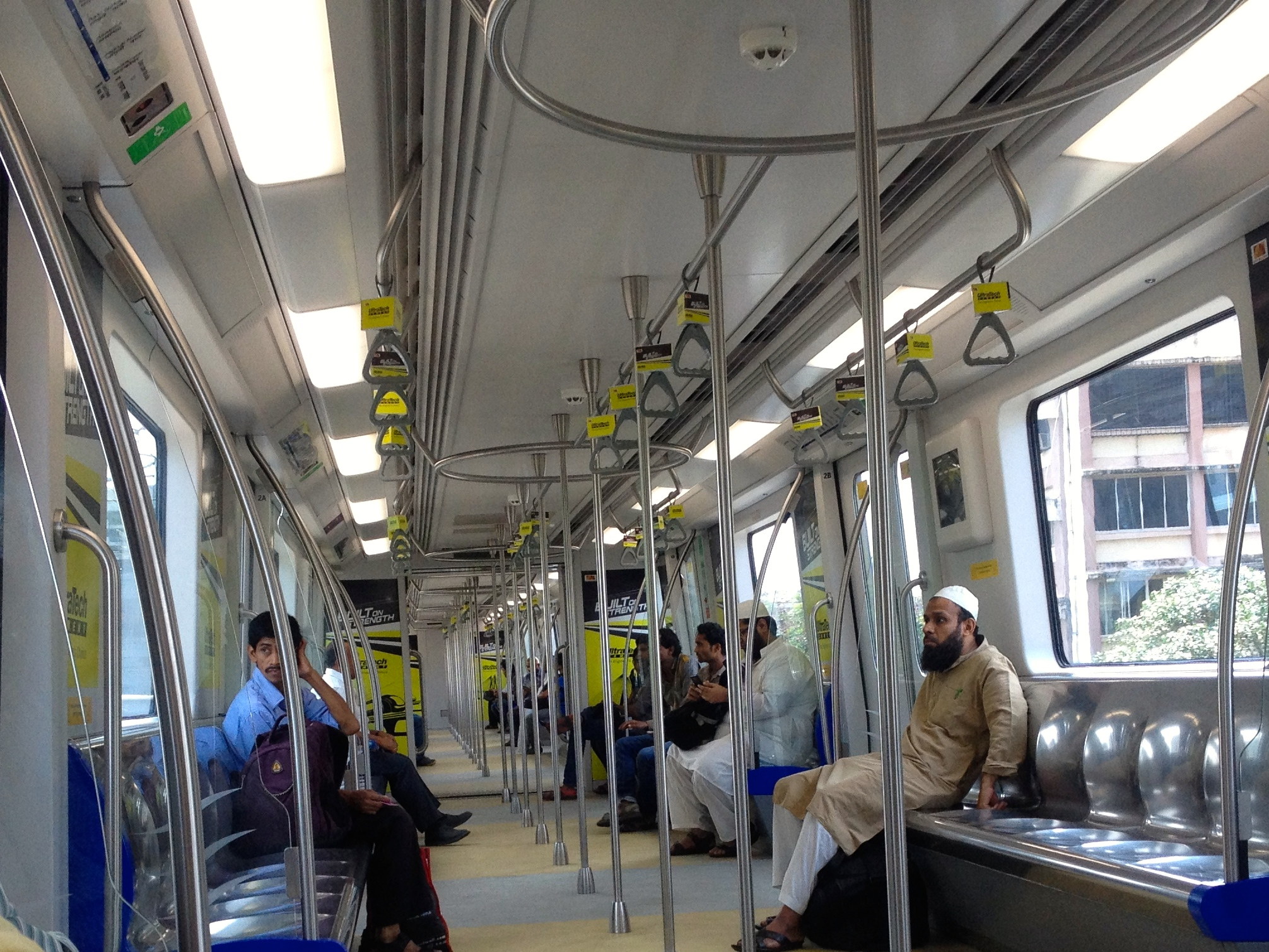
Interiors of the Metro coach

The rolling stock is cleaned daily in an automated washing plant utilizing eco-friendly technology.

MMOPL initially used a Wheel Flange Lubrication (WFL) system to reduce wear and tear of rolling stock wheels. The agency invested ₹30 crore (US$3.1 million) to introduce a Radio Frequency Identification (RFID) chip based system to accomplish the task. The MMOPL said that the RFID system provides even longer lifespan for wheels, and the agency states that it will recover the ₹ 30 crore investment within 2 years through savings on maintenance costs.

=== Power ===
The ABB Group was awarded the contract for supplying power systems to Blue Line on 31 July 2008. The line is electrified using 25 kV AC at 50 Hz via overhead catenary.

In early 2017, MMOPL completed the installation of light-emitting diode (LED) lighting at all metro stations, the depot, and administrative buildings to reduce electricity consumption. The MMOPL also began a project under the Renewable Energy Service Company (RESCO) model to install rooftop solar panels at all stations and the metro depot. Under the model, a private company will bear the cost of setting and operating the panels, and will sell the generated power to the MMOPL at a rate of ₹ 5.1 per unit. A total of 2.30 MWp will be generated by the system, of which about 2 MWp is generated by the station's rooftop solar panels and 0.30 MWp is generated by the depot's solar panels. The LED lighting system and solar panels are estimated to reduce Blue Line's carbon emissions by 2,430 tons per year.

The MMOPL said that 30% of the total annual non-traction power requirement of approximately 11 MW would be met using solar power from May 2017. Solar energy powers the operation of station equipment such as lighting, air-conditioning, lifts, escalators and pumps.

=== Signaling and communications ===
Blue Line features an advanced signaling system, including an automatic train protection system (ATPS) and automated signaling to control train movements. Siemens supplied the signalling and train control systems required for the project, while Thales supplied the communication systems. The network's signaling and train control systems are based on LZB 700M technology.

=== Bridges ===
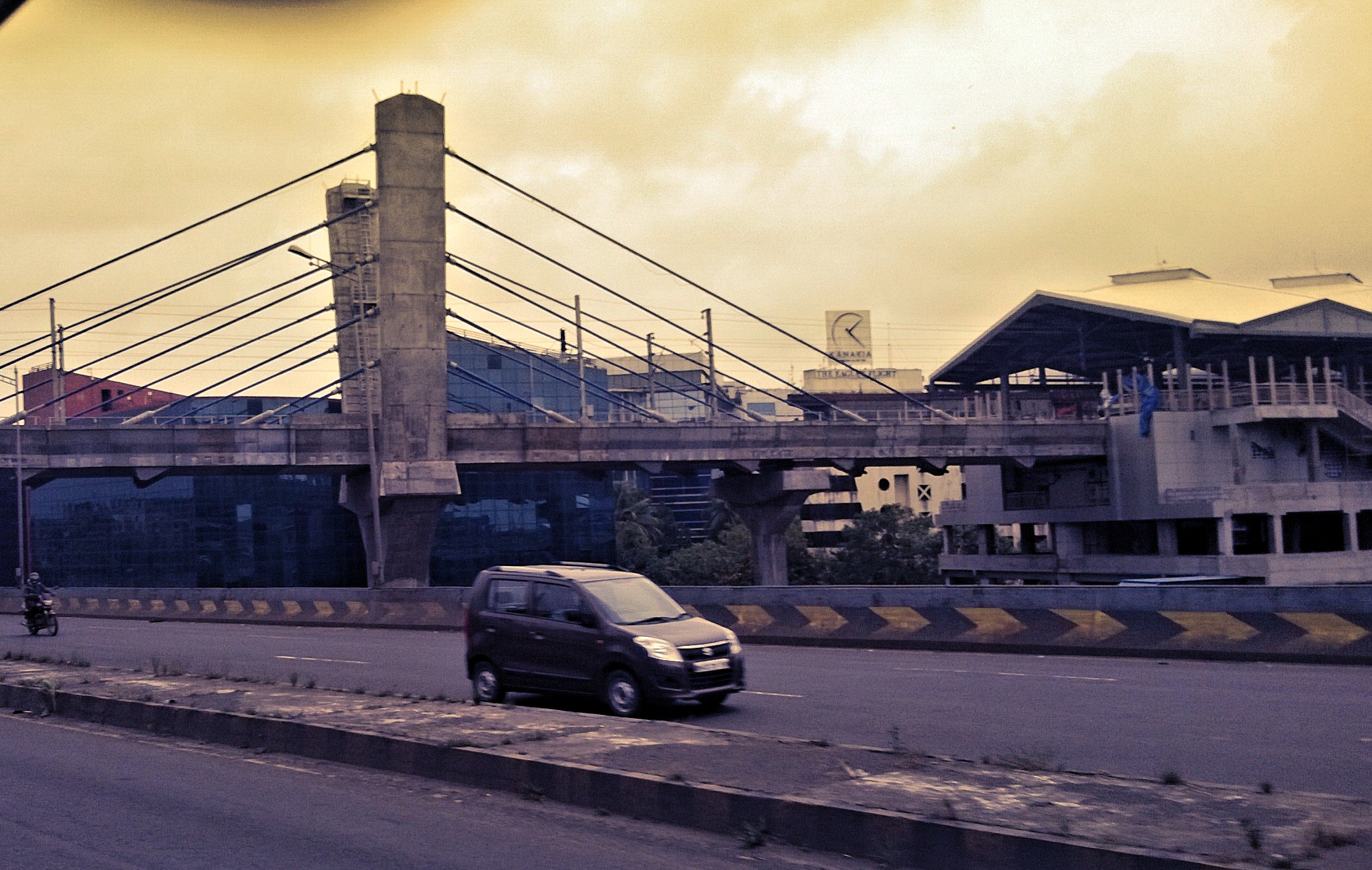
The cable-stayed metro bridge over the Western Express Highway in Andheri.

Blue Line contains a 1284-metre steel bridge, modeled on the Howrah Bridge in Kolkata, crossing the Western Line at Andheri. The bridge was constructed in 2012. It cost ₹350 million (equivalent to ₹720 million or US$7.5 million in 2026). The bridge, which was initially planned to be made of concrete, was constructed of steel by Braithwaite Burn & Jessop Construction Company (BBJ), Kolkata, who also fabricated the Howrah Bridge. The steel girders were pre-fabricated at BBJ's Heavy Plant Yard in Kolkata. The bridge was then disassembled and transported over the course of a week to the site.

Another notable bridge on Blue Line is the 175-metre-long cable-stayed bridge over the Andheri Flyover on the Western Express Highway. The Andheri flyover is 13 metres above ground level, and the metro line travels 6.5 metres above it. The bridge is 39 metres above the ground at its highest point. Construction on the bridge started in mid-2009 and was completed on 24 August 2012. The bridge was built by MMOPL, with Switzerland-based VSL International Limited as its partners.

=== Wastewater treatment ===
On 1 October 2012, Xylem, a water technology provider based in the United States, announced that it had been awarded a contract to develop wastewater treatment and recycling systems for the Mumbai Metro. The value of the contract was undisclosed. The system will incorporate a 1.2-million-litre-capacity sewage treatment plant with wastewater recycling capabilities; trials of the plant were expected to be commissioned by late November 2012. The plant will be equipped with Xylem's Sanitaire wastewater treatment technology, which is expected to help save up to 1.2 million litres of water a day.

== Operations ==
Lines on the Mumbai Metro are currently identified by numbers. In March 2016, MMRDA Metropolitan Commissioner, U.P.S. Madan, announced that all lines on the system would be colour coded after more lines were opened. Blue Line is generally depicted in blue in most maps, including on maps onboard Blue Line trains, leading to speculation that the line would be renamed the Blue Line when the colour coding is announced.

=== Operator ===
Logo of MMOPL, the special purpose vehicle (SPV) that operates Blue Line 1

The contract for the Versova–Andheri–Ghatkopar corridor (Blue Line 1) was awarded in March 2007 to Mumbai Metro One Pvt Ltd (MMOPL), a special purpose vehicle (SPV) formed specifically to implement the project. MMOPL was promoted as a public–private partnership with equity participation from Reliance Infrastructure (69%), the Mumbai Metropolitan Region Development Authority (MMRDA) (26%), and Veolia Transport (5%). Veolia's stake has since been transferred to RATP Dev Transdev Asia. RATP Dev Transdev Asia later sold its 5% stake to MMOPL, resulting in Reliance Infrastructure increasing its shareholding to 74%.

While MMOPL is the project owner and asset operator, day-to-day train operations were contracted to Metro One Operation Pvt Ltd (MOOPL), a separate joint venture between Reliance Infrastructure (30%) and RATP Dev Transdev Asia (70%), under a 5-year operations and maintenance agreement.

MMOPL is designated as the Metro Railway Administrator under the Metro Railway (Operations and Maintenance) Act, 2002. Although this legally requires RTI compliance, a workaround has been implemented where RTI requests for Blue Line 1 can be routed through the MMRDA, similar to the model used for Rapid Metro Gurgaon.

The initial 5-year contract to operate and maintain the metro expired on 7 June 2019. MMOPL expressed its intent to extend this contract beyond the initial term.

In April 2017, MMOPL partnered with Google to provide real-time train schedules and indoor station maps via Google Maps.

Following the COVID-19 pandemic lockdown in India, operations were suspended in March 2020. In August 2020, MMOPL informed MMRDA of its intention to divest its stake, citing financial losses.

=== Fare collection ===
The minimum and maximum fares on the line are ₹ 10 and ₹ 40 respectively, roughly 1.5 times the current unsubsidized BEST bus fare for a given distance. Blue Line utilizes an Automatic Fare Collection System (AFC). The contract for the fare collection system was awarded to Spain's Indra Sistemas in 2008. Riders can pay their fare using tokens, reloadable smart cards or by through QR code payment. Smart cards can be recharged online.

From 19 June 2014, the MMOPL introduced an off-peak fare of ₹ 5 on Blue Line. The fare applies between any two stations, regardless of distance, from 5:30am to 8:00am on weekdays. The relevant token must be purchased during off-peak hours and used within half an hour of purchase. Smartcards automatically deduct the lower fare if a commuter uses his card to exit the metro during off-peak hours. Approximately 55% of commuters on the line, pay using smart cards as of June 2015.

From January 2017, passengers can also purchase tickets on their phone and enter the gates by means of QR code payment. The service is provided by Paytm and a QR code is generated on the commuter's phone which is read at entry and exit by a scanner at the turnstiles. In January 2020, MMOPL started issuing paper tickets with a QR code printed on it with an aim to completely move from the earlier plastic RFID-based tokens. The same month, it launched an unlimited trip pass that could be purchased as an add-on to an existing trip pass. In November 2022, MMOPL began allowing passengers to purchase tickets through WhatsApp. Passengers can text "Hi" to 967000 8889 to receive a link through which they can complete the ticket purchase, and ultimately receive a QR code that serves as the ticket.

In December 2023, MMOPL began accepting the National Common Mobility Card (NCMC) at all metro stations.

=== Frequency ===
Services operate on Blue Line for 18.5 hours everyday (5:30 AM to midnight). Headway on the line is 3 minutes during peak hours and 5 minutes during non-peak hours (11:30am and 4:30pm).

Station dwell time is 30 seconds. Blue Line has a high rate of punctuality with 99.99% of trains arriving on time.

=== Ridership ===
A metro train has four coaches and an overall capacity of 1500 passengers (375 per coach). The seating capacity of every coach alternates between 48 and 52, of which 4 seats in each coach are reserved for senior citizens and handicapped commuters. From 15 August 2014, following demands by female commuters, 32 of 48 seats in the Versova-end coach of every four coach train is reserved for women. These seats are part of a reserved space for women which is separated from the rest of the coach by a strip separator and can accommodate 150 passengers, including standees. Male children under the age of 12, who are accompanied by female passengers, are permitted in the reserved space. Prior to the introduction of the reserved space, 6 seats per coach had been reserved for women.

Blue Line transported 200 million passengers within 786 days of operations. It crossed the 250 million mark on 11 February, or within 957 days, the fastest time in which any metro in India has reached the milestone.

The maximum ridership recorded on a single day was 312,215 and minimum was 64,522 till January 2019. In early January 2019, a strike by BEST staffers saw a spike in the ridership of the Metro and the Monorail. Daily ridership crossed 500,000 for four consecutive days with an average increase of 55,000 per day with ridership touching 520,000 on 11 January.

Growth of ridership on the corridor slowed down in 2019 when the BEST undertaking slashed its minimum fares to ₹5 for up to 5 kilometres (3.1 mi).

=== Speed ===
The RDSO Chief Engineer Ajay Kumar Verma initially permitted a maximum speed of only 50 km/h (31 mph). "These tracks have been constructed based on European standards but we follow Indian Railway standards. The two have differences on several technical parameters, including the tolerance limit of tracks and even curves," said a railway official. The slower speed added around 7 minutes to the journey time. Another reason why trains on the line operate at slower speeds is because stations are only 800 to 1,000 m (2,600 to 3,300 ft) apart, which prevents trains from picking up speed.

Trains began operating at speeds of 65 km/h (40 mph) from 24 March 2016. The increase is not expected to significantly reduce travel time on the line due to the low inter-station distance. The Commissioner of Metro Railway Safety (CMRS) granted approval to operate at speeds up to 80 km/h (50 mph), and RDSO gave its clearance on 18 November 2015. The MMRDA plans to further increase the operating speed to that limit after training metro pilots to operate trains at higher speeds.

=== Security ===
In a statement on released 13 December 2013, MMOPL announced, "Trained sniffer dogs will patrol each of the stations. There will be security guards in civilian dress who will intermingle with the public to check for any suspicious activity outside and inside the station premises." Security is provided by private security guards deployed by MMOPL and the Maharashtra State Security Corporation.

Other security measures on Blue Line include metal detectors, security cameras, frisking each passenger, and running their luggage through X-ray scanners. All stations are fitted with fire alarm systems and fire safety devices, and trains have fire resistant metal doors. Passengers are prohibited from carrying luggage measuring more than 2 ft x 1.5 ft on the metro.

Stations are actively monitored by security personnel. A senior metro official explained, "The trained unit will keep an eye in the vicinity of Metro stations in plain clothes, posing as common men. The unit will be on the lookout for mischievous activities in Metro stations by miscreants and take necessary action. Depending on the kind and level of trouble and threat posed by such people, action will be taken against them. Senior security personnel will take a call if these persons can be punished or penalised under the Central Metro Act, or should be handed over to the local police for necessary action."

Following an incident on the mostly underground Kolkata Metro Blue Line on 23 June 2014, where a non-AC metro train carrying passengers developed a glitch and got stuck inside a tunnel for an hour and a half, Mumbai Metro officials commented that their system has an emergency evacuation plan in place. An MMOPL spokesperson said, "The evacuation process will take two minutes if passengers are asked to alight midsection and 7–10 minutes if the train has to be taken to the nearest station."

== Retail and advertising ==
In December 2013, Times Innovative Media OOH acquired the advertising rights on Blue Line for a period of 15 years.

All 12 stations on the line have food and beverage shops, convenience stores, and ATMs. Some stations have mobile accessories stores. Lite Bite Foods Pvt Ltd (LBF) was awarded the food and beverage concessions across all stations on Blue Line. LBF supports these outlets from their 6,400 sq ft commissary near the international airport.

Stations on the line have special Domino's Pizza outlets that can serve pizzas within 3–5 minutes of ordering, much faster than a typical outlet's 10–15 minutes. The outlets use turbo ovens and pizza warmers to reduce the time for preparation. The outlets also have glass windows through which customers can view their pizza being made. The outlets only serve pizzas of one specific size. The first such Domino's Pizza outlet in India was opened at Chakala station in June 2015. Andheri and Versova were the next to receive such outlets, with plans to expand it to all stations on the line.

== See also ==
- Mumbai
- Public transport in Mumbai
- Mumbai Suburban Railway
- List of Mumbai Metro stations
- List of rapid transit systems in India
- List of Metro Systems
- Yellow Line (Mumbai Metro)
- Aqua Line (Mumbai Metro)
- Green Line (Mumbai Metro)
- Orange Line (Mumbai Metro)
- Pink Line (Mumbai Metro)
- Red Line (Mumbai Metro)
- Gold Line (Mumbai Metro)
- Purple Line (Mumbai Metro)
- Pink Line (Mumbai Metro)
