= Andheri metro station =

Mumbai Metro One rapid transit station

Andheri अंधेरी
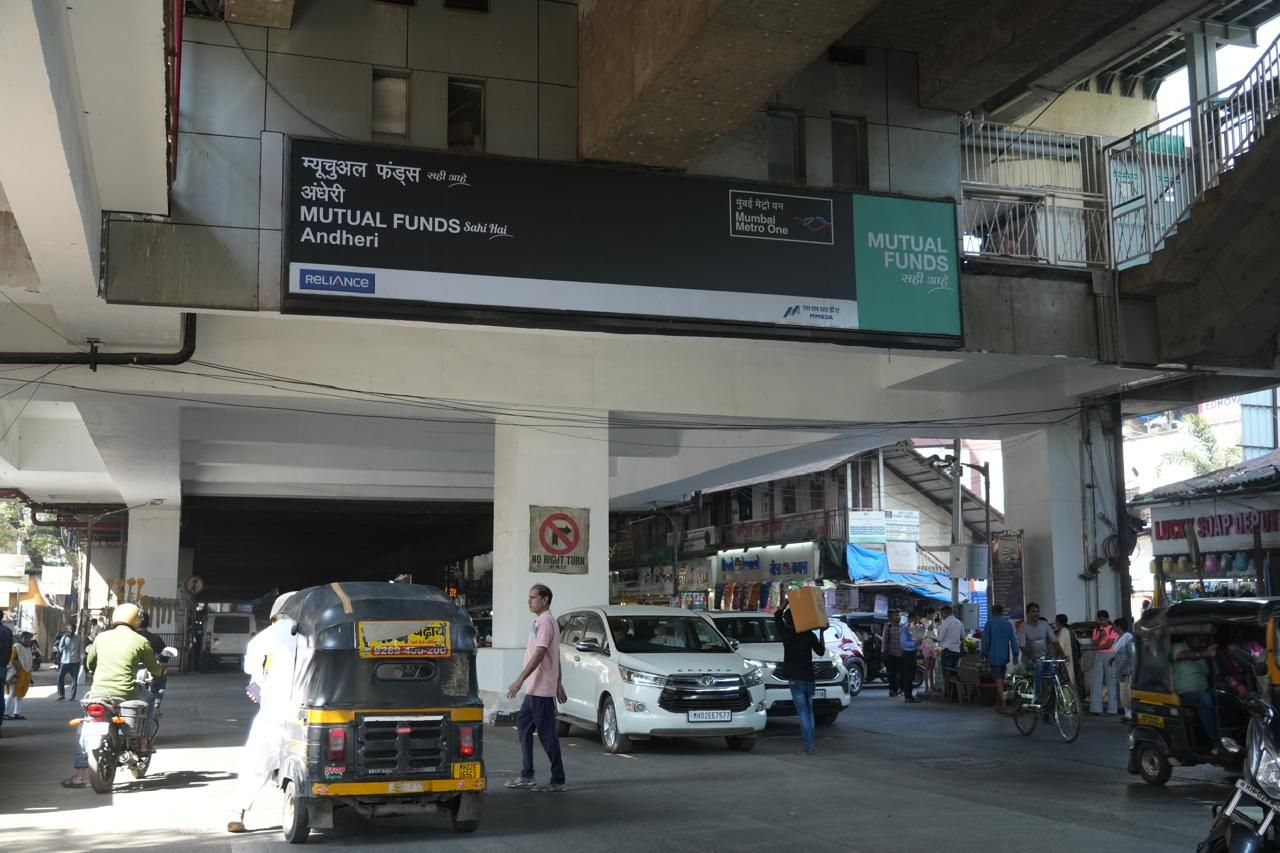
- Andheri metro station in December 2025

General information
- Location: Andheri railway station, Mathuradas Vasanji Road, Andheri, Mumbai, Maharashtra 400069
- Coordinates: 19°7′14″N 72°50′53″E
- Operator: Mumbai Metro One Pvt Ltd
- Line: Line 1
- Platforms: 2 side platforms
- Connections: Western Harbour Andheri

Construction
- Structure type: Elevated
- Parking: No
- Accessible: Yes

Other information
- Station code: AND

History
- Opened: 8 June 2014; 12 years ago

Passengers
- 2023: 86,218
- Rank: 2 out of 12

Services
Preceding station	Mumbai Metro One	Following station
Azad Nagar towards Versova	Line 1	Western Express Highway towards Ghatkopar
Location

Andheri (also called Mutual Funds Sahi hai Andheri for sponsorship reasons) is an elevated metro station on the East-West Corridor of the Blue Line 1 of Mumbai Metro serving the Andheri suburb of Mumbai, India. It was opened to the public on 8 June 2014. After Ghatkopar, Andheri is the busiest station on Line 1, with a daily passenger traffic of 72,125 in February 2017.

The Andheri station is connected with the Andheri railway station's foot-over bridge through a skywalk. MMOPL later built a shorter connector that reduced the time taken by commuters to switch systems.

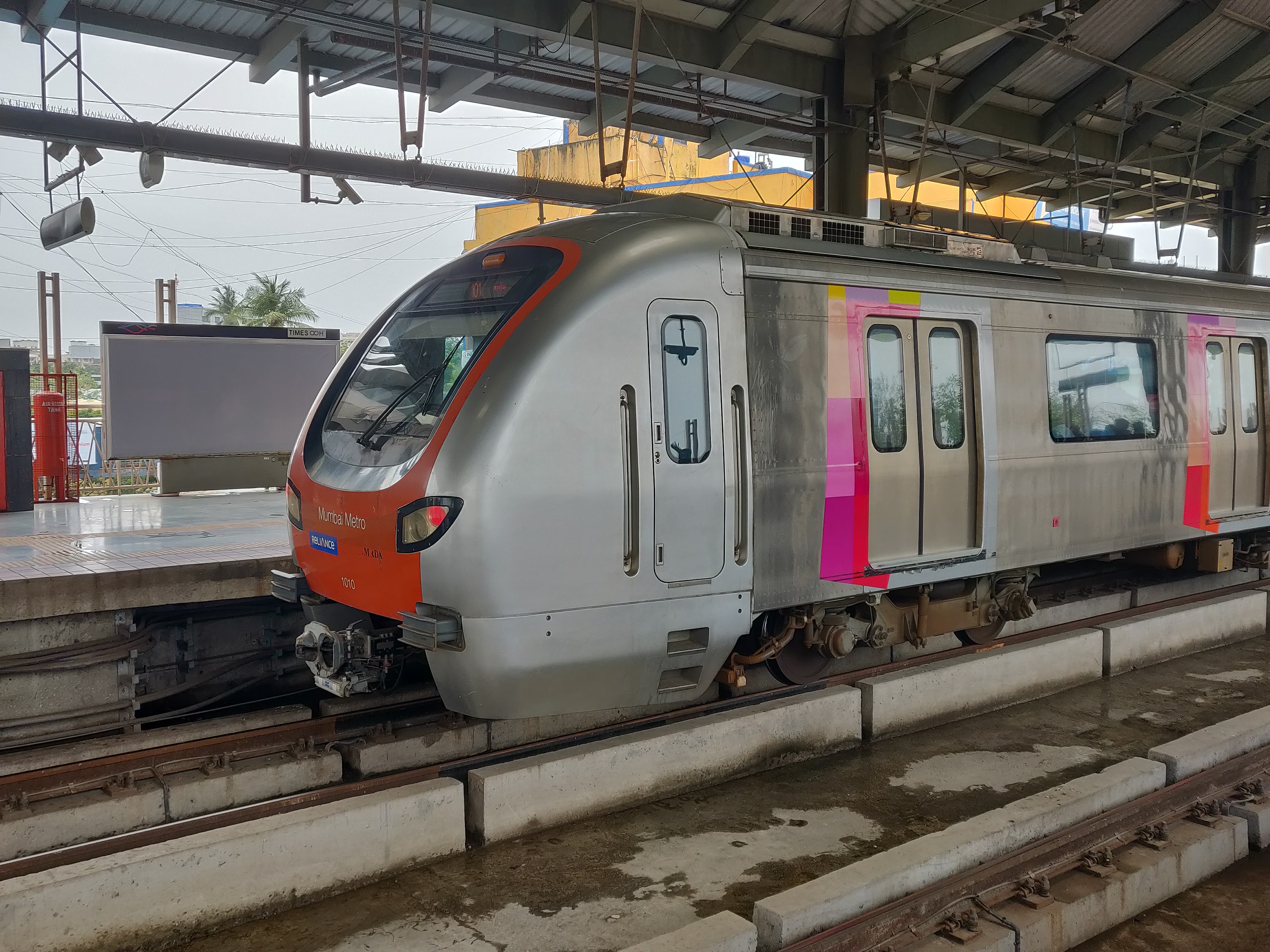
Metro rake approaching Andheri station

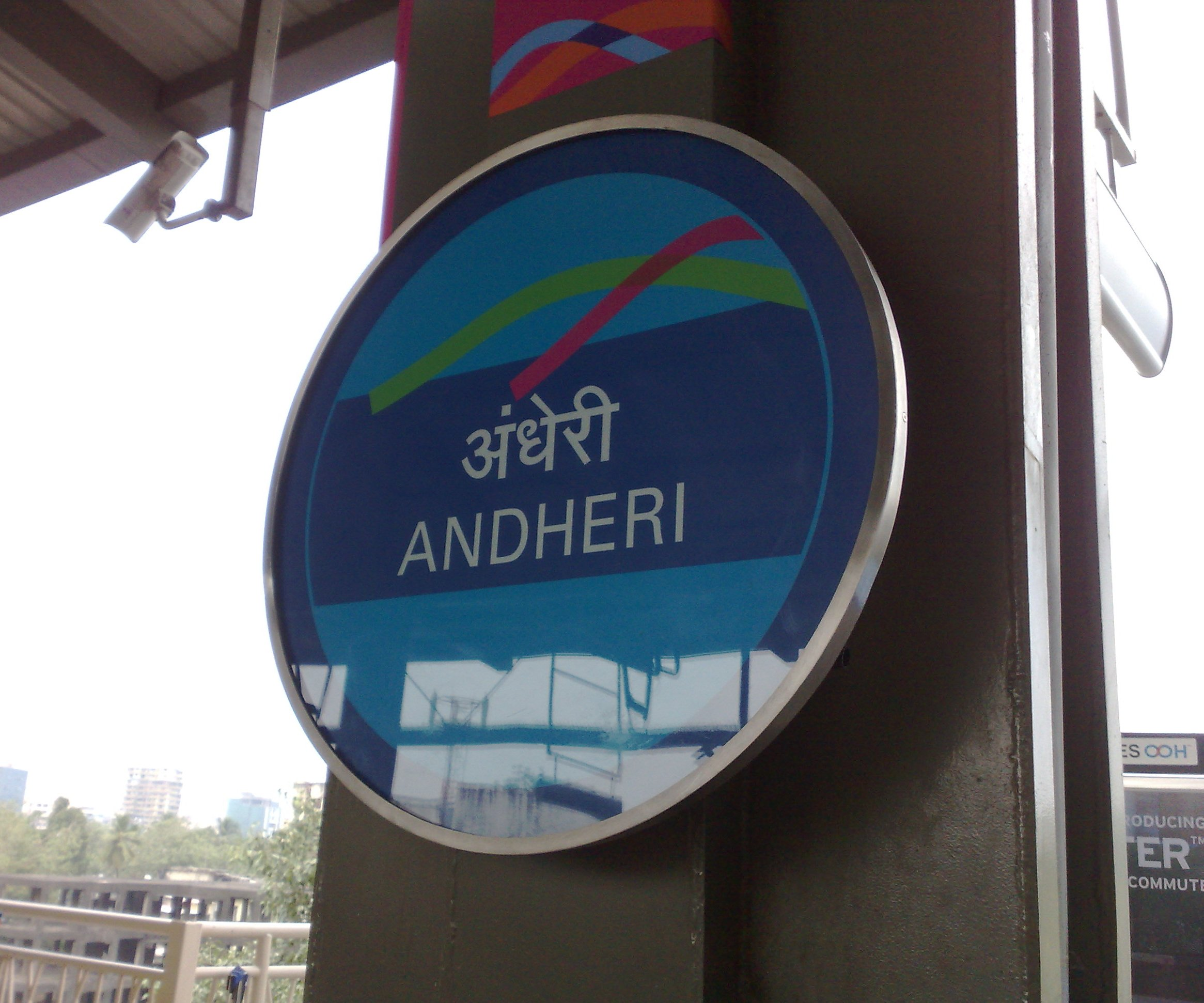
Andheri – Platform board

Like other Line 1 stations, the interior walls of Andheri station are embellished with murals. The designs at Andheri were styled by three third-year architecture students: Shamika Desai, Misri Patel, and Shriya Sanil.

== History ==
In February 2017, MMOPL announced that Andheri station would be rebranded as Bank of Baroda Andheri Metro station, as part of a sponsorship deal. In April 2021, following the expiration of Bank of Baroda's sponsorship, the Life Insurance Corporation of India (LIC) took over the sponsorship, leading to another rebranding of the station.

From March 2025, Mumbai Metro One decided to terminate some metros at Andheri coming from Ghatkopar during Peak hours of the day to manage frequency of metros.

== Station layout ==
2nd Floor	Side platform
2nd Floor	Platform 1	towards Ghatkopar (Western Express Highway) →
2nd Floor	Platform 2	← towards Versova (Azad Nagar)
2nd Floor	Side platform
1st Floor	Mezzanine	Fare control, station agent, Metro Card vending machines, crossover, food stalls, coffee/tea stalls, flea sales (at times they allow stalls for sales like clothes, jewelry, food items, small collectibles, etc.)
Ground	Street level	Exit/Entrance

== Entrances and exits ==
- 1 - Near Nagardas Road
- 2 - Near Ganesh Temple, Towards Vishal Hall
- 3 - Near Andheri Court
- 4 -
- 5A - Near Pay n Park
- 5B -
- 5C -
- 5D - Near Prasadam Hotel
- 5E - Towards Agarkar Chowk Bus Depot

== See also ==
- Public transport in Mumbai
- List of Mumbai Metro stations
- List of rapid transit systems in India
- List of Metro Systems
