= Versova metro station =

Mumbai Metro's Blue Line 1 terminal metro station

Versova वर्सोवा
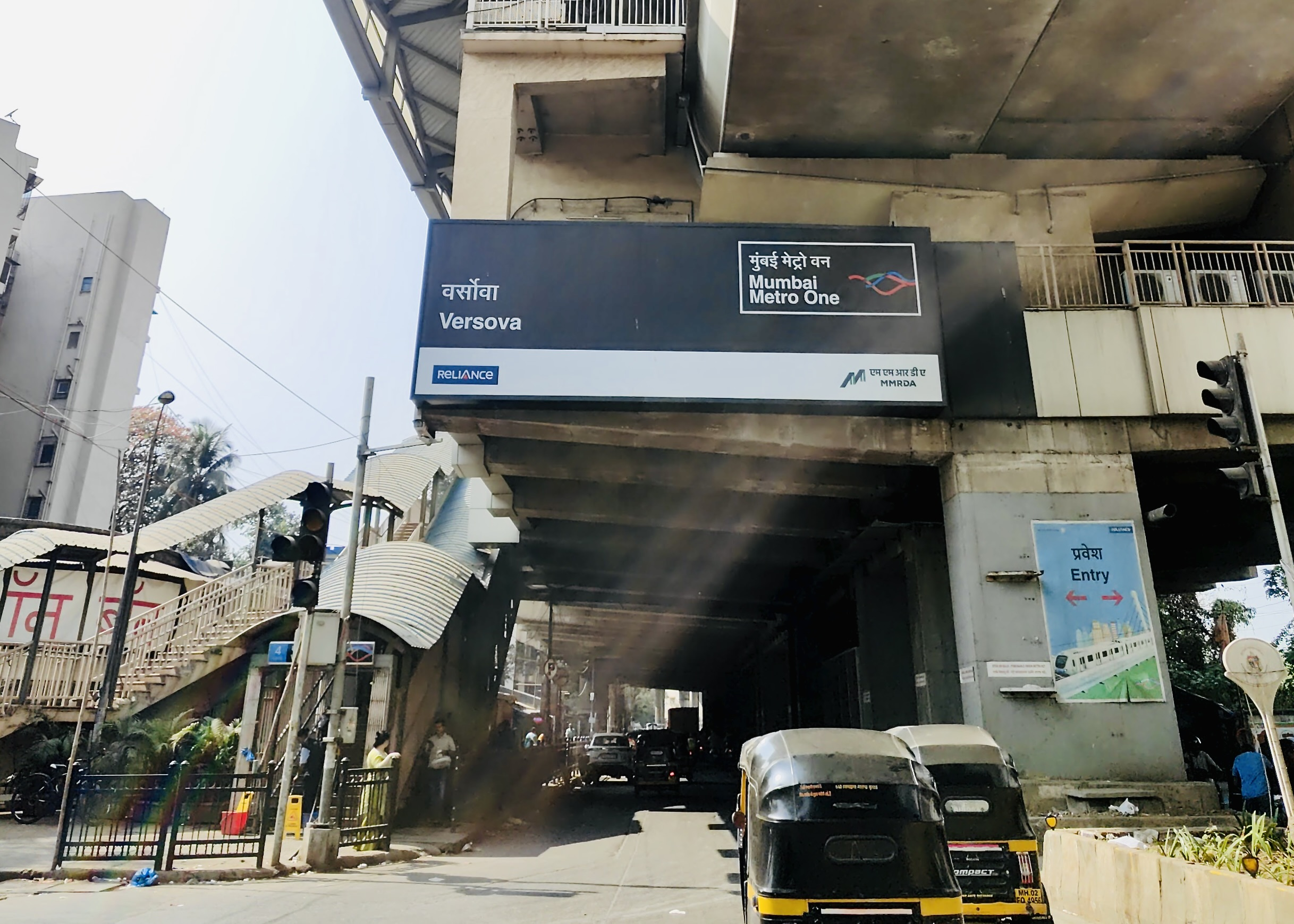
- Street-level view of Versova metro station concourse on Line 1

General information
- Location: JP Road, Model Town, Andheri (West), Mumbai
- Coordinates: 19°7′49″N 72°49′17″E
- Operator: Mumbai Metro One Pvt Ltd
- Line: Line 1
- Platforms: 2 Side platforms

Construction
- Structure type: Elevated
- Parking: No
- Cycle facilities: Yes
- Accessible: Yes

Other information
- Station code: VER

History
- Opened: 8 June 2014; 12 years ago

Services
Preceding station	Mumbai Metro One	Following station
Terminus	Line 1	D N Nagar towards Ghatkopar
Route map
Blue Line
Location

Versova is the elevated western terminal metro station on the East-West Corridor of the Blue Line 1 of Mumbai Metro serving the Seven Bungalows, Yari Road and Versova neighbourhoods of Andheri in Mumbai, India. It opened to the public on 8 June 2014 and consists of two side platforms. The station is located at Seven Bungalows.

With 12% of all Blue Line 1 commuters traveling through the station, Versova is the third-busiest station on the line, after Ghatkopar and Andheri.

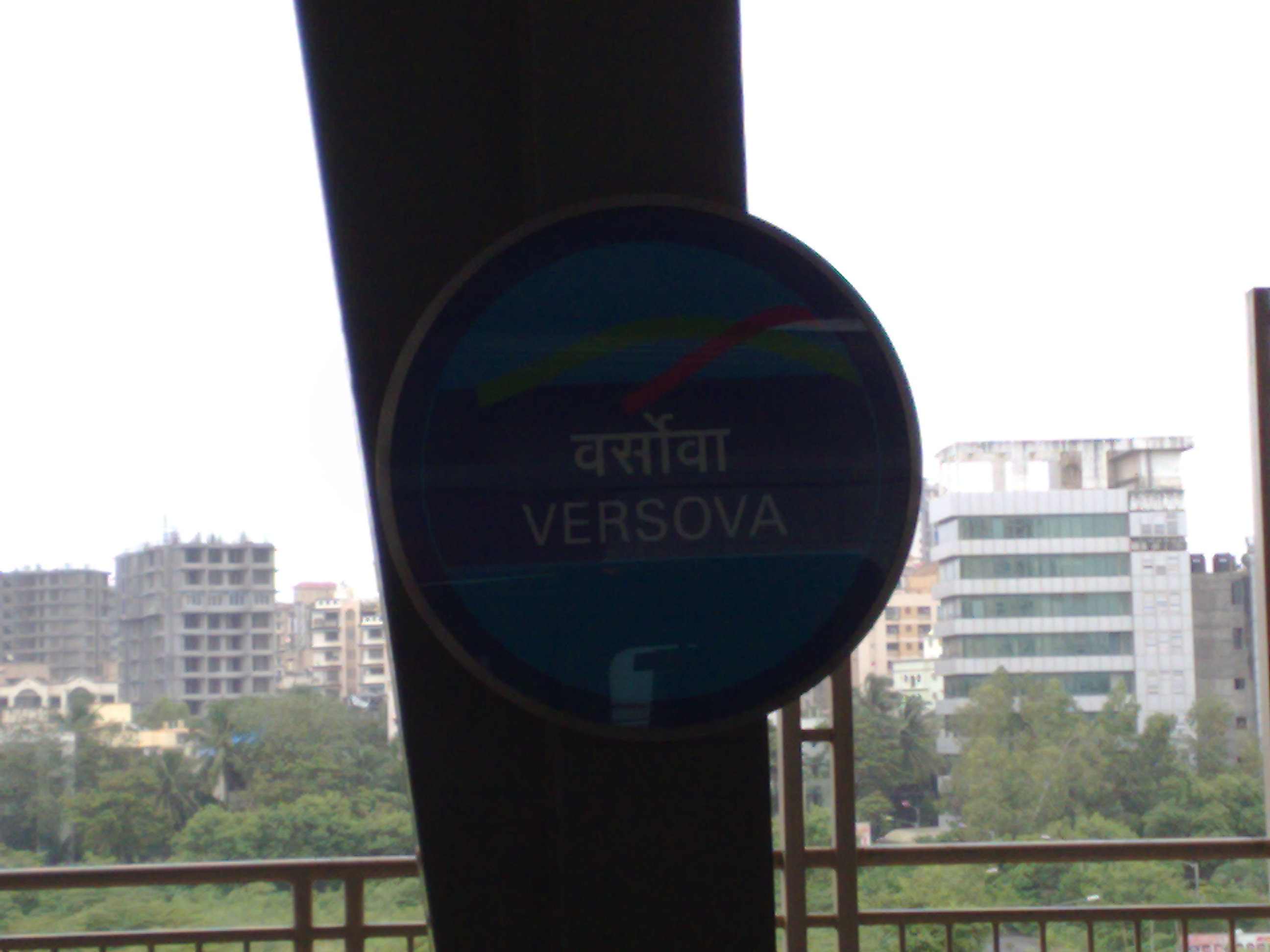
Versova metro station

== History ==
Versova metro station was not planned for the metro rail but after many negotiations, the station was added. In 2012 the construction of the station was completed at a cost of ₹200Cr. A new metro is under construction in the same area by the name of Pink Line (Line 6) and will make the congestion less on Line 1.

== Station layout ==
2nd Floor	Side platform, doors will open on the left
2nd Floor	Platform 1	Line 1 towards Ghatkopar (D N Nagar) →
2nd Floor	Platform 2	← Alighting only
2nd Floor	Side platform, doors will open on the left
1st Floor	Mezzanine	Fare control, station agent, Metro Card vending machines, crossover
Ground	Street level	Exit/Entrance

=== Entrances and exits ===
- 1 - Near 7 Bungalows bus depot
- 2 -
- 3 - Near Model Town, Towards Kokilaben Hospital
- 4/5 - Near Bon Bon Shoes
- 6 - Near Yari Road

== Connections ==
The Versova-Andheri-Ghatkopar corridor spans 11.40 km (7.08 mi) and is elevated. It serves as a crucial link connecting the Eastern and Western suburbs to the Western and Central Railway lines. The corridor facilitates seamless interchange between the suburban rail system and the MRT system at Andheri and Ghatkopar Stations, enhancing commuter convenience. It has slashed the journey time between Versova and Ghatkopar from 71 minutes to just 21 minutes, greatly improving efficiency and reducing travel hassles for passengers. Additionally, the corridor provides rail-based access to key industrial zones such as MIDC and SEEPZ, along with fostering connectivity to various commercial developments.

== See also ==
- Public transport in Mumbai
- List of Mumbai Metro stations
- List of rapid transit systems in India
- M-Indicator
