= Andheri =

- Suburb
- Location in Mumbai
- Coordinates: 19.119°N 72.847°E
- Country: India
- State: Maharashtra
- District: Mumbai Suburban
- City: Mumbai

Government
  - Body: Brihanmumbai Municipal Corporation (BMC)

Language
  - Official: Marathi
- Time zone: IST GMT+530
- PIN: 400069 (Andheri East), 400059 (J B Nagar, Marol), 400093 (MIDC), 400053 (Azad Nagar), 400058 (Andheri West), 400072 (Sakinaka, Saki Vihar), 400096 (Santacruz Electronics Export Processing Zone), 400099 (Chhatrapati Shivaji Maharaj International Airport, Sahar), 400049 (Juhu), 400061 (Versova)
- Area code: 022
- Vehicle registration: MH 02
- Lok Sabha constituency: Mumbai North West

Andheri ([ən̪d̪ʱeɾiː]) is a suburb situated in Western Mumbai, Maharashtra, India.

== History ==
The Prakritized form of the Sanskrit name "Andhaka-giri" is mentioned as a name of Andheri in the 15th-17th century Marathi-language text Mahikavatichi Bakhar.

== Government and politics ==
Administratively, Andheri is a village in the Andheri taluka of the Mumbai Suburban district. It is bifurcated into Andheri (west) and Andheri (east). Andheri (west) comes under K/W ward of the Brihanmumbai Municipal Corporation (BMC), while Andheri (east) comes under the K/E ward of BMC.

== Economy ==
Andheri east and west are key areas in Mumbai, where several film studios and TV news channels are located.

Andheri West has the head office of PVR INOX.

Andheri was the founding point of the local ice cream brand Pastonji.

== Transportation ==
Public transportation within Andheri is typically handled by BEST buses, metro and auto-rickshaws.

The Andheri railway station is among the busiest railway stations in the city. The expansion of the Mumbai Metro in the Versova-Andheri-Ghatkopar corridor is part of the government's master transportation plan.

=== Mumbai Metro ===
Blue Line 1 of the Mumbai Metro spans the entire suburb of Andheri (Andheri metro station) connecting Versova in the west to Ghatkopar in the Eastern Suburbs, covering a distance of 11.4 kilometres (7.1 mi). It is fully elevated, and consists of 12 stations, nine of which are in Andheri. Work on the corridor began on 8 February 2008. A cable stay bridge over Western Express Highway and a Steel Bridge spanning the Western railway line were completed at the end of 2012. The line opened for service on 8 June 2014. Approximately 85 million passengers used the line in the first 11 months of service.

Blue Line 1 provides intersected connectivity with:

- Central Railway at Ghatkopar leading to Ghatkopar railway station
- Aqua Line 3 at Marol Naka via the underground station
- Gundavali station of Red Line 7 at WEH Metro station
- Western and Harbour railway lines at Andheri
- Andheri West station of Yellow Line 2A at DN Nagar Metro

Pink Line 6 will function from Lokhandwala to Kanjurmarg via Jogeshwari of 14.5 km long, expected to open from 2024.

== Areas ==
Andheri West is a vast area divided into many sub areas. Some of the major areas in Andheri West are as following:

- Four Bungalows
- Seven Bungalows
- Lokhandwala
- Versova
- Oshiwara

== See also ==
- Mira Road
- List of schools and colleges in Andheri

== Notes ==
- Shrivastava, Prabhat, and S. L. Dhingra. "Operational Integration Of Suburban Railway And Public Buses—Case Study Of Mumbai." Journal of Transportation Engineering 132.6 (2006): 518–522. Academic Search Premier. Web. 29 May 2012.
