= Ghatkopar metro station =

Mumbai Metro's Blue Line 1 terminal metro station

Ghatkopar घाटकोपर
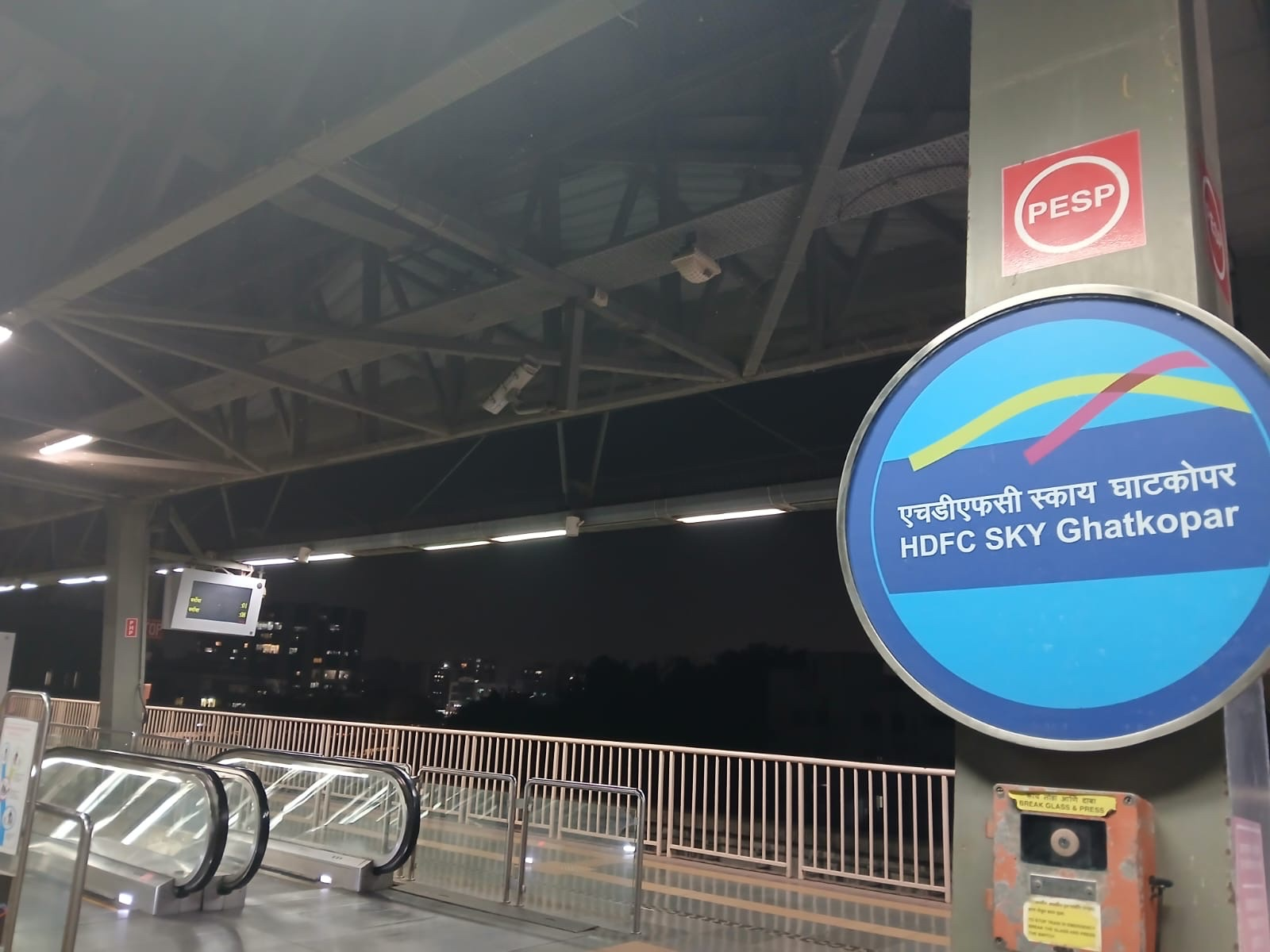
- The island platform at Ghatkopar metro station

General information
- Location: Shraddhanand Road-Hirachand Desai Road, Ghatkopar (W), Near Ghatkopar railway station, Mumbai, Maharashtra 400086
- Coordinates: 19°5′11.98″N 72°54′28.76″E
- Operator: Mumbai Metro One Pvt Ltd
- Line: Line 1
- Platforms: 1 island platform
- Connections: Central Ghatkopar

Construction
- Structure type: Elevated
- Accessible: Yes

Other information
- Station code: GHK

History
- Opened: 8 June 2014

Passengers
- 2023: 115,441
- Rank: 1 out of 12

Services
Preceding station	Mumbai Metro One	Following station
Jagruti Nagar towards Versova	Line 1	Terminus
Location

Ghatkopar is the elevated eastern terminal metro station on the East-West Corridor of the Blue Line 1 of Mumbai Metro serving the Ghatkopar suburb of Mumbai, India. It was opened to the public on 8 June 2014. Ghatkopar is the busiest station on Line 1, with a daily passenger traffic of 115,441 in December 2023.

== History ==
The Mumbai Metropolitan Region Development Authority (MMRDA) acquired a 1,400-square-metre plot near the Ghatkopar railway station for the construction of the Ghatkopar metro station. The MMRDA initially believed that the land belonged to the Brihanmumbai Municipal Corporation (BMC). While the metro was being constructed, the Central Railway Zone (CR) wrote letters to the MMRDA, informing them that the land actually belonged to the CR. After CR submitted documents proving the same, the MMRDA agreed to compensate them for the plot. At a meeting between MMRDA and CR officials in April 2014, it was agreed that the former would pay ₹18 crore (US$1.9 million) for acquiring the land as part of an inter-governmental agency deal. However, some CR officials were reportedly upset, as the amount was far lower than the market value of the land. As per market trends at the time, the land was estimated to be worth ₹180 crore (US$19 million).

== Infrastructure ==
In March 2017, MMOPL completed the installation of LED lights at the station. The replacement of the station's 1,718 lamps with LED lights halved its energy consumption. Only lamps were replaced; fixtures were not. The total reduction in the station's electricity consumption amounts to 120,000 units per year, providing the MMOPL with an annual saving of ₹12 lakh (US$12,000).

There are 7 sets of automated fare collection (AFC) gates at Ghatkopar station. Three more will be installed by the end of June 2014. The station has textured tiles, intended to provide grip to commuters who use wheelchairs. The station also has an elevator wide enough to accommodate a wheelchair, and a ramp from road level up to the elevator, enabling access for the disabled.

=== Station layout ===
2nd Floor
2nd Floor	Platform 1	← towards Versova (Jagruti Nagar)
2nd Floor	Island platform
2nd Floor	Platform 2	← towards Versova (Jagruti Nagar)
1st Floor	Mezzanine	Fare control, station agent, Metro Card vending machines, crossover
Ground	Street level	Exit/Entrance

=== Foot overbridge ===
The Ghatkopar station is connected with the western side of the Ghatkopar railway station through a 12-meter-wide foot overbridge (FOB). Commuters who want to exit the metro station from the main gate must purchase a platform ticket to cross the FOB and reach the road.

Although the Central Railway (CR) had initially permitted metro commuters to use the FOB as a goodwill gesture, around two weeks after the metro's opening, they announced that commuters found using the FOB without a platform ticket or a railway pass would be fined. A CR official told Mid-Day, "We have seen the flow of passengers, and we think that our local train passengers are facing a problem because of the sudden rush of Metro passengers. Therefore, we are now insisting that Metro passengers buy tickets to use the railway-owned overbridge." Railway Pravasi Sangh President Subhash Gupta told the paper, "I am aware of this issue and also took it up in the meeting with railway officials. The railway FOB here can't take the burden of thousands of additional Metro passengers. The rush has increased manifold after Metro services started."

The Mumbai Rail Vikas Corporation (MRVC) completed improvement works at the Ghatkopar railway station on 25 December 2023. The project aims to ease congestion caused by the spillover of commuters from the Versova-Andheri-Ghatkopar Metro-1 into the rail premises. A new 12-metre-wide and 75-metre-long foot over bridge (FOB) was constructed to connect the east and west sides of the station, along with platforms 1/2/3/4. The FOB features a three-metre-wide staircase and escalators on platforms 2/3/4.

In addition, an elevated deck was built to connect the new middle FOB and the existing bridge of Metro 1, aiming to provide respite to metro rail commuters. The upgraded station also features more ticket counters, food stalls, and shops. The first phase of these infrastructure additions, including Automated Ticket Vending Machines on the elevated deck, was carried out at a cost of ₹28 to 30 crore. The overall cost, including the second phase, was estimated to be ₹60-70 crore. The improvements are expected to alleviate the then stampede-like situation during peak hours and facilitate a smoother commute for both local train and metro passengers.

== Entrances and exits ==
- 1A - Toward L.B.S. Marg, Sarvodaya Hospital
- 1B - Near Bata Showroom
- 2A - Near Bhau Vadapav
- 2B/3 - Near Ghatkopar railway station
- 4 - Near Khot Gali Market

== Gallery ==
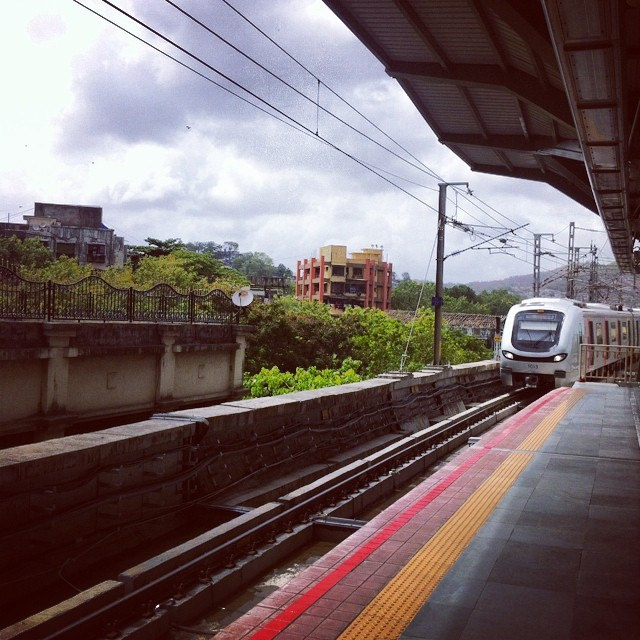
Mumbai Metro train arriving at Ghatkopar

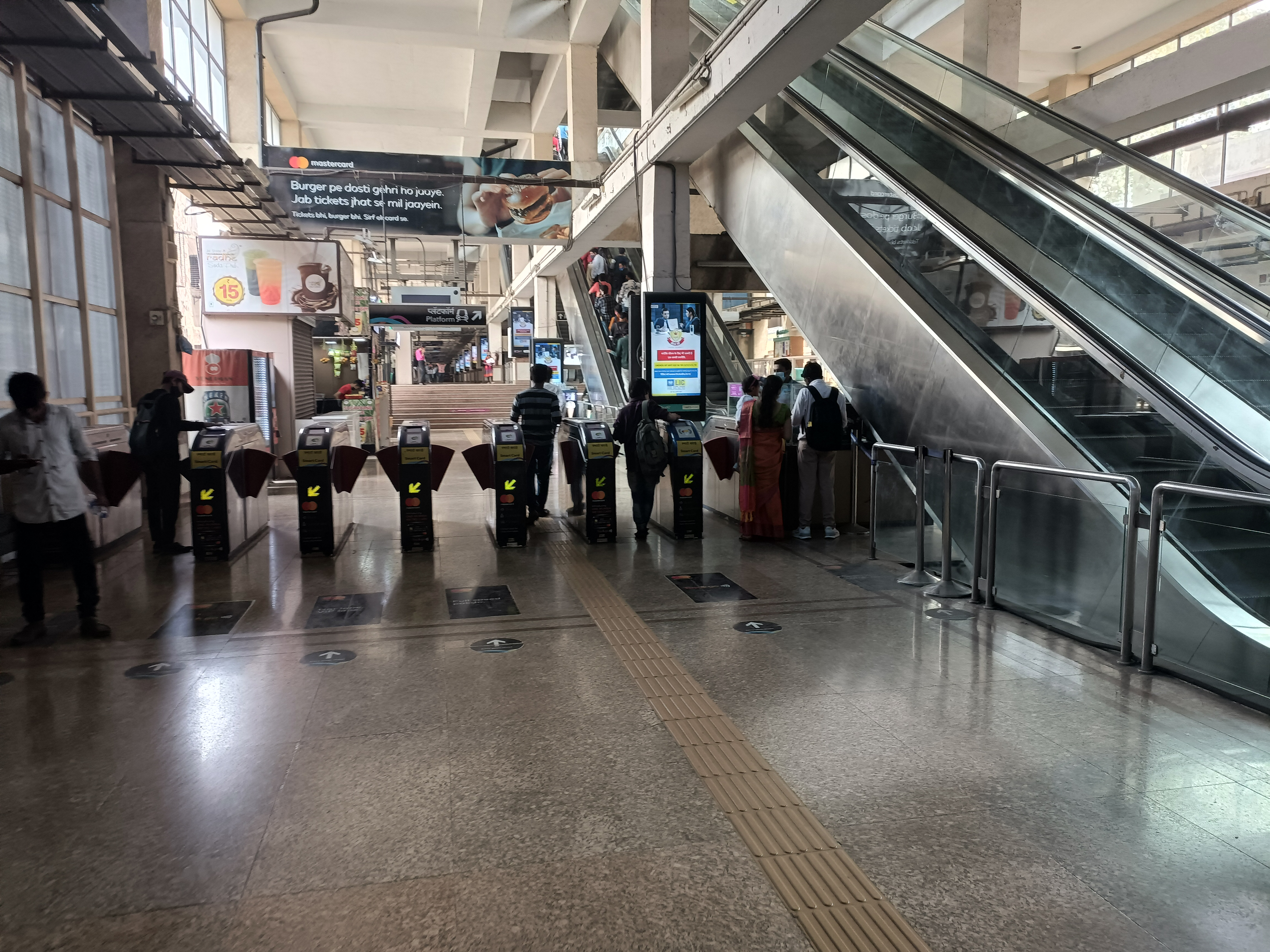
The Mezzanine at Ghatkopar metro station.
