= Jagruti Nagar =

Locality in the suburb of Ghatkopar in Mumbai, India

Coordinates: 19.0922221°N 72.9008315°E

Jagurti Nagar is a locality in the suburb of Ghatkopar in Mumbai, India. It lies along the arterial Andheri-Ghatkopar Link Road and is served by the Jagruti Nagar metro station of Mumbai Metro's Line 1.

== Aviation accidents ==
In July 1949, a KLM Lockheed L-749 Constellation PH-TDF "Franeker" crashed into a 674-foot (205 m) hill in Jagruti Nagar, killing all 45 aboard. Thirteen of those killed were American news correspondents. In 2018, a Beechcraft C90 King Air on a chartered trip from Juhu Aerodrome crashed in the vicinity, killing all five people on board.
