= Asalpha =

Asalpha Asalfa
- neighbourhood
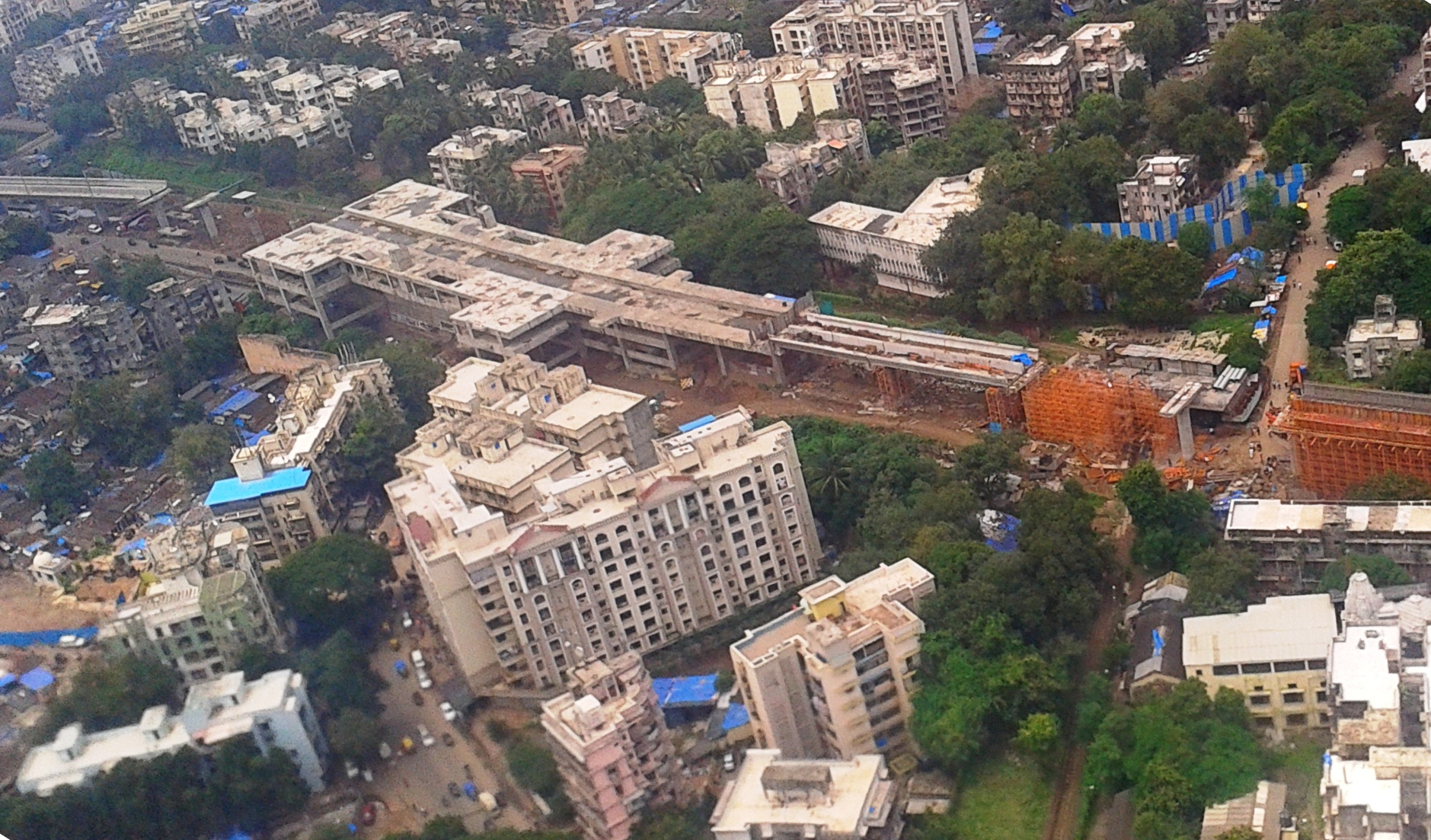
- Birds-eye view of the Asalpha metro station under construction on Blue Line 1 of the Mumbai Metro
- Nickname: The Positano of Mumbai
- Location in Mumbai, India
- Coordinates: 19.091°N 72.901°E
- Country: India
- State: Maharashtra
- District: Mumbai Suburban
- City: Mumbai
- Ward: L

Government
  - Type: Municipal Corporation
  - Body: Brihanmumbai Municipal Corporation (MCGM)
- Elevation: 23 m (75 ft)

Languages
  - Official: Marathi
- Time zone: UTC+5:30 (IST)
- PIN: 400084
- Area code: 022
- Vehicle registration: MH 03
- Civic agency: BMC

Asalpha or Asalfa is a neighbourhood in Ghatkopar (West), a suburb of Mumbai.

== Infrastructure ==
Asalpha is connected by BEST bus routes to Ghatkopar railway station. (340, 334, 421, 429, 325) Andheri railway station (340, 334, 410) Kurla railway station (325), and Chandivali (421), as well as Oshiwara (444), Borivali (226 Ltd, 470 Ltd) and Mahim (321 Ltd). Blue Line 1 of the Mumbai Metro passes through Asalpha. The construction of Jagruti Nagar and Asalpha Metro stations in this locality has led to rapid development of infrastructure in and around Asalpha.

Many hospitals are present in the area, including Vivek Diagnostic Centre, Abhishek Hospital, Pooja Hospital and Sona Hospital. Some of the known schools in Asalpha are AIES High School (All India Education Society High School), HBVM (Hindi Bal Vidhya Mandir High School) and Theresa High School. It is covered by many slum areas and there are just a few buildings, Govind Nagar and Himalaya society were the first society in Asalpha.

== See also ==
- Western India
