= Kalyan Airstrip =

Former airport of Mumbai, Maharashtra, India

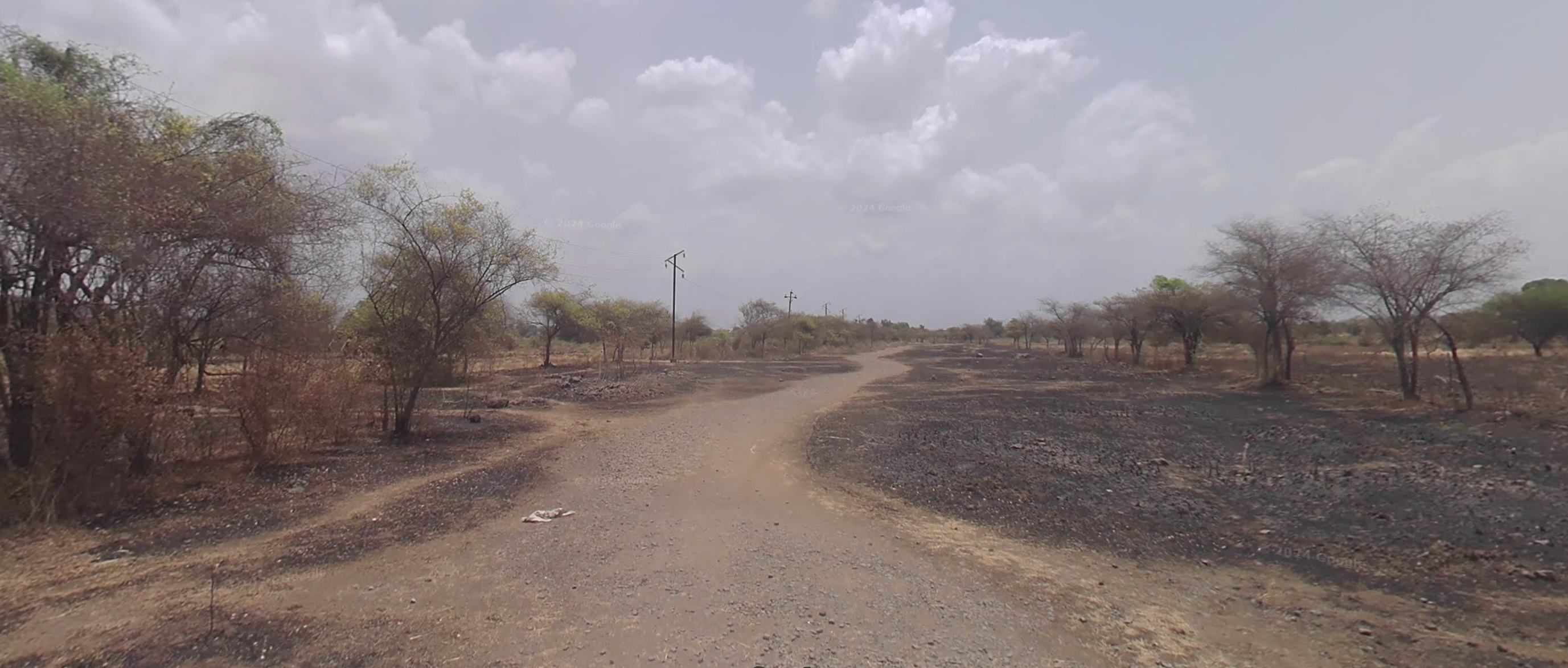
- Remains of the abandoned NE-SW Runway of RAF Kalyan as seen in May 2022.
- IATA: none; ICAO: none

Summary
- Airport type: Defunct
- Operator: Royal Air Force (1942–1947)
- Serves: Mumbai Metropolitan Area
- Location: Kalyan, Maharashtra, India
- Elevation AMSL: 60 ft (18 m)
- Coordinates: 19°10′27.8″N 073°08′10.8″E

Map
- Location in India

Runways
Direction	Length		Surface
Direction	ft	m	Surface
08/26	6,000	1,830	Concrete/Dirt
03/21	6,000	1,830	Concrete/Dirt

Kalyan Airstrip was located at Nevali village, 6 km (3.7 mi) south of Kalyan railway station and 55 km (34 mi) north of Chhatrapati Shivaji Maharaj International Airport. It was the primary landing ground for the nearby city of Bombay (now Mumbai) as early as 1920, much before the airfields of Juhu and RAF Santa Cruz were established.

As a Royal Air Force station during World War II in British India, the airfield served as RAF Kalyan from 1942 to 1947 and was abandoned after the war. It is owned by the Ministry of Defence but has been encroached upon.

Several Fighter Squadrons and support units were stationed at Kalyan from 1942 to 1947. The field was abandoned after the war.

== History ==
The airfield at Nevali was used by the RAF pilots during World War II to give operational cover to the Bombay region. The total area of the Nevali air base was over 1,800 acres (7.3 km^{2}). Post-Independence, ownership of the land was transferred to the Ministry of Defence. In June 2017, the Navy began constructing a boundary wall to protect the remaining land from further encroachment, since around 400 acres of the land was encroached upon over the years.

Unit	Dates	Aircraft
No. 20 Squadron RAF	1945–1946	Supermarine Spitfire, Hawker Tempest
No. 110 Squadron RAF	March 1942	Vultee Vengeance, de Havilland Mosquito
No. 7110 Servicing Echelon	30 Sep – 6 Oct 1944	
No. 3 Mobile Parachute Servicing Unit	1945 – Jan 1946	
No 129 Staging post	31 Jan – 7 Apr 1945	

== Proposal to use site for International Airport ==
In October 2006 the Government of Maharashtra first proposed the Kalyan-Nevali site as a candidate for a second airport for the Mumbai Metropolitan Region. However, the Ministry of Civil Aviation was not very keen on the idea and wanted to focus on the second airport in Navi Mumbai. The Kalyan site was proposed because, compared to the Panvel site, the total area of the Nevali Airbase was over 1,800 acres (7.3 km^{2}) relatively free of any natural obstacles and, unlike the Panvel site, there was no possibility of CRZ (Coastal Regulatory Zone) violations, flattening of mountains or diversion of any rivers. The Union Ministry of Environment and Forests had raised environmental objections on the proposed location of the Navi Mumbai International Airport near Kopra Panvel area, because the construction of the airport would involve reclamation of low-lying areas in an ecologically fragile zone as well as destruction of several hectares of mangroves. Hence the State Government proposed several alternate sites, one of which centred on a 1,800 acres (7.3 km^{2}) piece of land owned by the Airports Authority of India near Kalyan

In August 2007, the national security advisor (NSA) had communicated to the state chief minister that the airport could not be developed on the 1,800 acres of defence ministry land due to safety and security reasons because a R&D laboratory of Bhabha Atomic Research Centre (BARC) was being constructed in the adjacent area. The proposal was also opposed by farmers in the Kalyan-Ambarnath belt who contended that the project would require more land than what was available with AAI, thus affecting around 22,000 farmers from 18 villages in the vicinity of the site.

The state government dropped the idea of examining alternative sites in February 2014 as it had secured all necessary approvals for the Panvel site.

== Current use ==
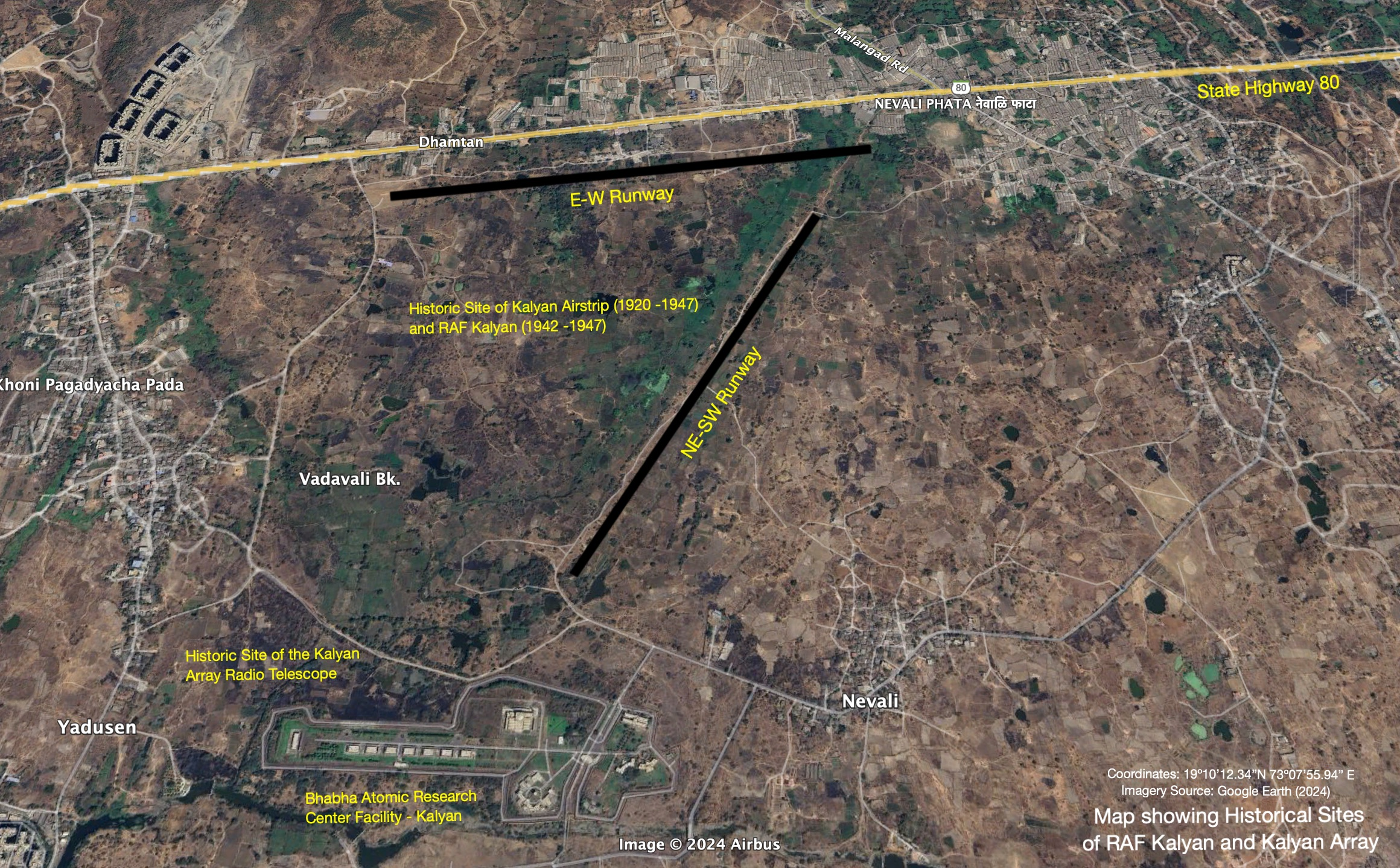
Satellite image overlaid onto the historical locations of the Kalyan Airstrip (RAF Kalyan) and its two abandoned runways.

The site is located on Haji Malang Road at Nevali village, 6 km (3.7 mi) south of Kalyan railway station and 55 km (34 mi) away from the Chhatrapati Shivaji Maharaj International Airport at Sahar in Mumbai. It lies close to urban areas of the Kalyan Dombivli Municipal Corporation. The nearest railway station is Kalyan Junction railway station on the Central Railway of the Mumbai suburban railway network.

The site can also be accessed from State Highway 2 (Kalyan-Murbad-Ahmednagar highway) and the NH 160 (Nashik-Thane national highway) which was earlier numbered NH 3 before renumbering of all national highways by National Highway Authority of India in 2010 year.

The two abandoned runways have been encroached upon by local population and now host dirt roads serving nearby villages. The southern end of the site now hosts a research and development laboratory of the Bhabha Atomic Research Centre (BARC).
