= Flight 472 =

Flight 472 may refer to:

- Japan Airlines Flight 472 (1972), runway overrun on 24 September 1972
- Japan Airlines Flight 472 (1977), hijacking on 28 September 1977
