= Japan Air Lines Flight 472 =

Japan Air Lines Flight 472 may refer to two aviation accidents:

- Japan Air Lines Flight 472 (1972), runway overrun on 24 September 1972
- Japan Air Lines Flight 472 (1977), hijacking on 28 September 1977
