= Juhu Aerodrome =

Coordinates: 19°05′53″N 72°50′02″E

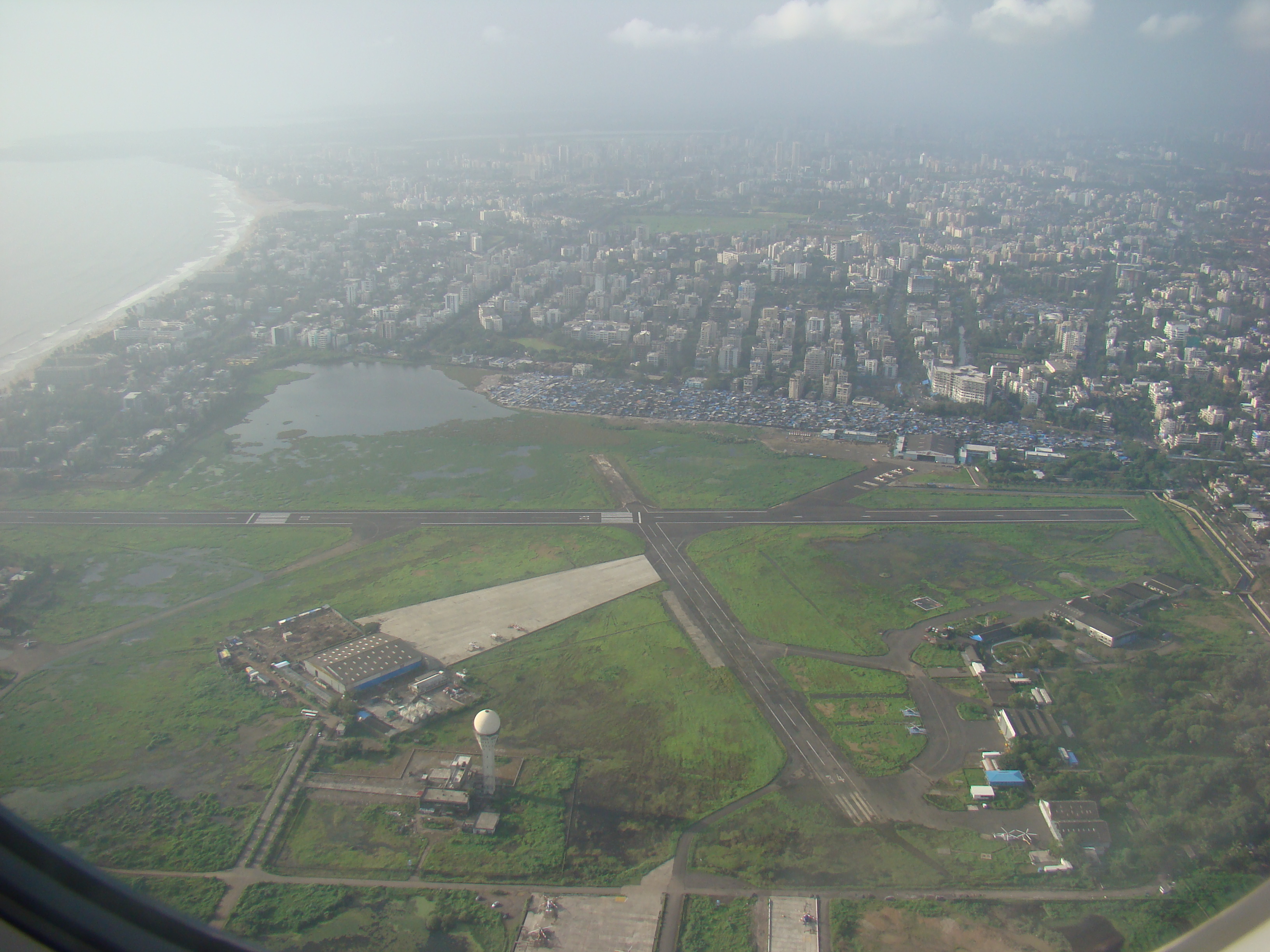
- IATA: none; ICAO: VAJJ

Summary
- Airport type: Public
- Owner: Airports Authority of India
- Operator: Airports Authority of India
- Serves: Mumbai
- Location: Juhu, Mumbai, Maharashtra, India
- Opened: 1928; 98 years ago
- Hub for: Pawan Hans
- Elevation AMSL: 13 ft (4.0 m)

Map
- Location within Mumbai

Runways
Direction	Length		Surface
Direction	ft	m	Surface
08/26	3,750	1,143	Paved
16/34	2,400	731	Paved

Statistics (April 2025 – March 2026)
- Passengers: 98,559 (▼25.1%)
- Aircraft movements: 20,821 (▼12.8%)
- Cargo tonnage: 236.2 (▼6.7%)
- Source: AAI

Juhu Aerodrome (ICAO: VAJJ) is located in Juhu, an upmarket residential suburb of Mumbai, Maharashtra, India. It is served primarily by general aviation aircraft and helicopters. It was founded in 1928 as one of India's first civil aviation airport, 4 years after the Netaji Subhash Chandra Bose International Airport (CCU) was opened

In 1932, JRD Tata landed at the Juhu Aerodrome, inaugurating India's first scheduled commercial mail service. Juhu served as the city's primary airport during and up to World War II. In 1948, commercial operations were moved to the much larger RAF Santa Cruz (now Chhatrapati Shivaji Maharaj International Airport; CSMIA) which was built 2 km (1.2 mi) east of Juhu aerodrome during the war.

Today, the aerodrome handles all helicopter operations out of Mumbai. It also hosts the Bombay Flying Club and several executive and light aircraft and gliders. In 2010, the Airports Authority of India (AAI), which runs the airport, proposed to extend the runway 08/26 into the sea to allow larger aircraft to land, however permission for this was denied by the Ministry of Environment and Forests. With the New Coastal Regulation Zone (CRZ) rules of 2011 permitting roads on stilts, the Airports Authority of India announced in January 2012 that it would once again pursue its plan of extending the runway at Juhu Aerodrome into the sea.

== History ==
The aerodrome started off as an unpaved airfield in 1928, when it took over the role of Bombay's primary airfield from the Kalyan Airstrip which was built in the early 1920s. It was used by the then newly established Bombay Flying Club for teaching, joy-rides, and air travel. The activities of the club were limited by the fact that the aerodrome at Juhu was not suitable during the monsoon. Much progress had been made in the layout of the ground of the aerodrome by 1932, although the ground was still not fit for use during that year's monsoon. J. R. D. Tata, the father of civil aviation in India, made his maiden voyage to Juhu Airport from Drigh Road Airstrip in Karachi, via Ahmedabad, on 15 October 1932 carrying mail in a Puss Moth aircraft. The Tata Airmail Service, as it was called, continued on to Pune, Bellary, and Madras. This was the birth of Air India, which, in 1932, was based here out of a hut with a palm-thatched roof and had 1 pilot and 2 apprentice mechanics with 2-piston-engined aircraft, a Puss Moth and a Leopard Moth. Two bitumen runways - one aligned East - West, and the others North-Northwest - South-Southeast, were laid in 1936. During the monsoons, operations had to be shifted to Poona due to water logging. A third runway was planned for construction in 1939 but this never occurred. It served as the city's airport up to and during World War II.

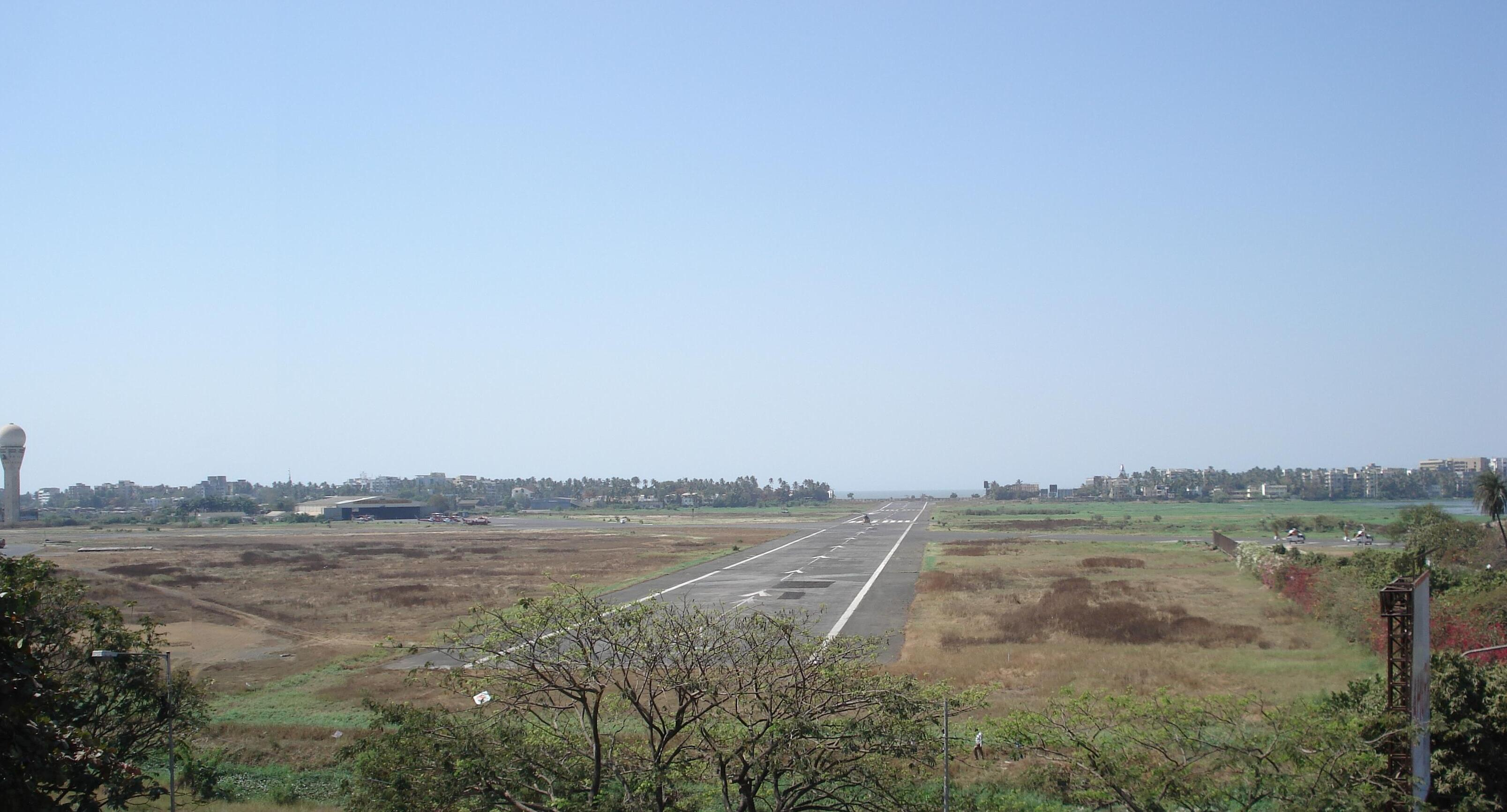
Runway 08/26, pointing towards the Arabian Sea

Waterlogging during the monsoon and the absence of proper runways for monsoon take-offs were serious drawbacks for Juhu aerodrome. The former problem was addressed by replacement of the bitumen runways with concrete runways in 1937, while proper runways, night flying facilities, hangars, etc. were provided in the following year. At least two airlines were based out of Juhu during this period; Air Services of India, Ltd. and Tata Sons, Ltd. The airport served as the city's sole airport till Santacruz Airport, now Chhatrapati Shivaji International Airport (CSIA), was built in 1948. Santacruz Airport is within a 2 km radius of Juhu Aerodrome and this proximity of the two airports often caused confusion among pilots, leading to a permanent notice to airmen being issued by the Airports Authority of India cautioning that Santacruz's runway 09/27 should not be confused with runway 08/26 at Juhu. Juhu Aerodrome continued to be used however, such as by then Prime Minister Jawaharlal Nehru in 1948 as well as by the ailing Vallabhbhai Patel (then Deputy Prime Minister) who landed at Juhu in December 1950 to avoid large crowds that had gathered at Santacruz Airport to greet him.

With air traffic congestion reaching an unacceptable threshold in Mumbai, the AAI put its age-old plan of reviving the Juhu Airport on the fast track to ease some pressure off of Chhatrapati Shivaji Maharaj International Airport (CSMIA) in 2010. The AAI appointed consulting major KPMG to draw up a development plan for Juhu Airport. It was envisioned that its airstrip could take up to 18% load off CSMI Airport with turboprop ATR and Boeing 737 aircraft. The plan was to extend the runway to 2000 meters in phases, this would have ultimately seen the airstrip jutting into the sea and utilizing reclaimed parts of the Juhu Beach and seafront. Permission for the expansion was denied by the Ministry of Environment and Forests in 2010. Instead, the ministry asked for conservation of the land around the airstrip, stating that no development should take place there and that it should be conserved as a green space to compensate for the pollution caused by the airstrip.

With the New CRZ rules of 2011 permitting roads on stilts in CRZ-I areas (within 100 metres of the shoreline), the AAI decided in January 2012 to pursue its plan to extend the existing runway westwards from the current 1,143 metres to 2,020 metres by building it on stilts over the Juhu-Tara Road and into the sea, involving a capital cost of ₹2,000 crore.

== Challenges to airport expansion ==
As part of the Rs 2,000 crore plan, the Airports Authority of India (AAI) wants to extend the main runway 650 metres into the sea while also realigning it to CSMIA's Runway 09/27. The extension will allow aircraft like ATRs and Bombardier Q-400 to use the airport, while the re-alignment of the runway is required to allow for simultaneous operations of the two airports.

The Juhu airport redevelopment plan, that received an in-principle nod from the State Government on 5 April 2013, involves closing down its secondary runway 16/34. Aviation experts have called the re-development blueprint most unsafe as closing of the secondary runway at Juhu would mean the airport would have to shut operations whenever CSMIA uses its secondary runway 14/32. The use of Juhu's main runway, while CSMIA's secondary runway is in use, will cause aircraft paths to intersect risking air safety. Airlines would be averse to operating from an airport which would either violate safety norms or be shut almost 40% of the time.

Another technical problem facing the project is that the current runway is at an elevation of only four metres above the mean sea level. An extension of the runway into the sea would mean having to account for the sea level during high tide. Experts say the elevation of the main runway to about 12 metres above sea level would require the elevation of the entire airport, leading to flooding in the neighbourhood in the monsoons.

The plan has also met with stiff opposition from local residents, who fear that the BMC's forty-year-old Development Plan (DP) that envisaged sports facilities, a recreation ground and two arterial roads would be shelved to accommodate the new airport. The re-aligned runway would also end less than a 100 metres from the gate of the 500-bed Nanavati Hospital disturbing patients. The extension of the runway is likely to divide the Iconic Juhu Beach that is visited by more than 10,000 tourists daily. The realignment will also require demolition of prime property in JVPD scheme and Vile Parle as some buildings are in conflict with the proposed realignment while other tall structures that will be an obstacle in the approach path will have to be lowered to one or two floors.

== Current status ==
- Juhu has two operational runways and is run by the Airports Authority of India. It is used as a heliport for private charters and to ferry Oil and Natural Gas Corporation personnel by carrier Pawan Hans to offshore oil rigs at Bombay High. Jal Hans, India's first seaplane service was launched at the Juhu Aerodrome in December 2010.
- Juhu Aerodrome handles all helicopter operations, including private helicopter charters out of Mumbai. Due to congestion at the CSMI Airport, in December 2010 all helicopter operations were moved to Juhu. The aerodrome can handle 6 helicopter operations at a time and currently handles about 100 helicopter operations a day.
- There is currently a plan to move all small private aircraft such as Beechcraft B-200 and Cessna C-90 operations from CSMI Airport to Juhu Aerodrome to decongest CSMI Airport. This was to take place by 10 January 2011. However, due to lack of infrastructure and security considerations, this has been delayed. As part of this move, the aerodrome is currently being upgraded to Instrument Flight Rules (IFR) from the current Visual Flight Rules (VFR).
- Currently the air controllers at CSMI Airport have to align aircraft to the Juhu flight path using their radar before they hand over the aircraft to Juhu. The airport is also being fitted with a Precision Approach Path Indicator (PAPI) to facilitate night landing facilities that have been demanded by helicopter operators.
- There is also a plan to align runway 08/26 with runway 09/27 of CSMI Airport to facilitate independent operations. While a new terminal building is being built to handle passenger movement, it currently only has a VIP terminal for private charter movements. There are also plans to extend the runway pending permissions.
- The airport is currently being guarded by the Maharashtra Home Guard who will soon hand over charge to the Central Industrial Security Force (CISF) that handles security for all major airports in India. A contingent of 174 personnel has been sanctioned for Juhu aerodrome with CISF infrastructure being accommodated in a renovated hangar. The CISF personnel will be armed with AK-47s and INSAS rifles.
- It will also have a vehicle-borne Quick Reaction Team (QRT). A perimeter wall is being built around the premises as well. The CISF personnel have however refused to take charge of the Airport security until a periphery wall is built.

== Accidents and incidents ==
- On 15 July 1953, a BOAC DH.106 Comet landed at Juhu Aerodrome instead of the much larger Santacruz Airport. The aircraft was flown out some nine days later.
- On 24 September 1972, a Japan Airlines operated Douglas DC-8 accidentally landed at Juhu Aerodrome instead of Santacruz Airport. The aircraft overran the end of the runway and was damaged beyond economic repair.
- On 13 October 2006, a private five seater Beechcraft B 55 aircraft owned by Container Movement Transport Pvt. Ltd. crash landed at the Juhu aerodrome after experiencing engine trouble and losing radio communications. The aircraft, on its way to Vadodara, returned to Mumbai, from where it had taken off, and was badly damaged as it caught fire on landing. All passengers escaped safely and there were no casualties.
- On 28 June 2018, a UV Aviation Beechcraft King Air C90 crashed near Sarvodaya, Ghatkopar in the Mumbai Suburban district during a test flight. Five people which included two pilots, two maintenance crew members and one passer-by were killed in the incident. Further investigation showed that the aircraft did not have the Certificate of Airworthiness.

== Culture and media ==
The first time the airport was used as a location for a Bollywood film was for the 1958 film Chalti Ka Naam Gaadi (Kishore Kumar, Madhubala) for its car race climax. The full film can be seen on YouTube. The aerodrome was also used for the opening scene of Slumdog Millionaire and can be seen in subsequent scenes as well. Part of the climax of the 2008 film A Wednesday was shot here. The aerodrome was referred to as Juhu Aviation Base in this particular film. The climax of Hindustan Ki Kasam was also shot here in 1999. A scene from movie Zameen starring Ajay Devgn and Abhishek Bachchan also shot here. Movie Sabse Bada Khiladi starring Akshay Kumar was also shot on Juhu Airport. Mostly all climax scenes were shot here.
