= 2018 UY Aviation King Air C90 crash =

Aircraft accident involving a Beechcraft king air

2018 UY aviation King Air C90 crash, Ghatkopar
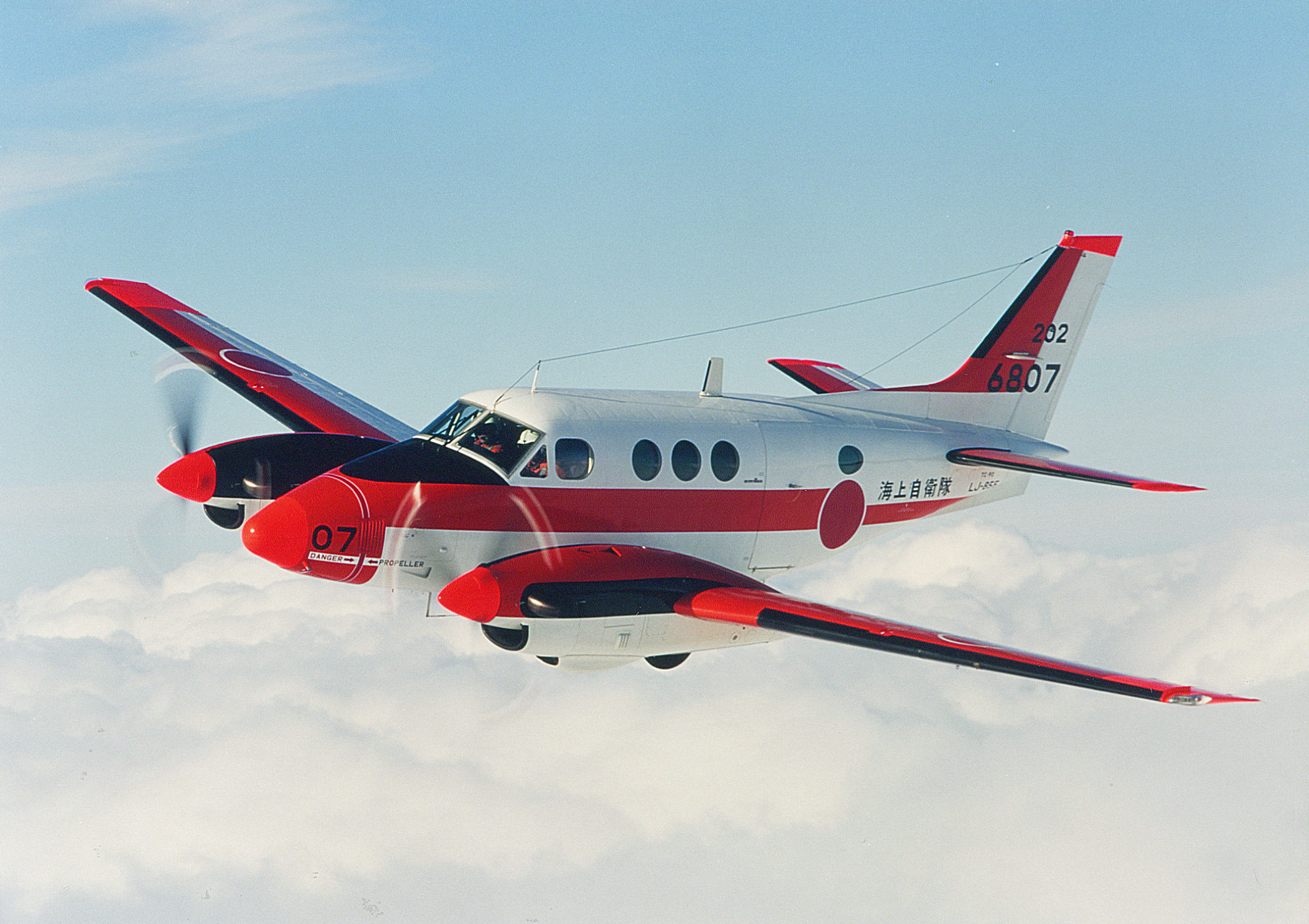
- A King Air C90, similar to the aircraft that crashed

Accident
- Date: 28 June 2018
- Summary: Stalled due to pilot error and spatial disorientation
- Site: Jagruti Nagar, Ghatkopar, Mumbai, India; 19.092°N 72.904°E
- Total fatalities: 5
- Total injuries: 3

Aircraft
- Aircraft type: Beechcraft C90 King Air
- Operator: UY Aviation
- Registration: VT-UPZ
- Flight origin: Juhu Aerodrome
- Destination: Juhu Aerodrome
- Occupants: 4
- Passengers: 0
- Crew: 4
- Fatalities: 4
- Survivors: 0

Ground casualties
- Ground fatalities: 1
- Ground injuries: 3

On 28 June 2018, at about 1:15 pm, a Beechcraft C90 King Air aircraft chartered from UY Aviation Pvt Ltd with the registration VT-UPZ crashed at Jagruti Nagar in the suburb of Ghatkopar in Mumbai, India. The 12-seater aircraft carried 4 people, including the pilot. All people on board plus one person on the ground were killed. A further three people on the ground were seriously injured.

As a result of the crash, a fire broke out in the built-up area. Local firefighters and police responded to the accident.

The aircraft had departed from Juhu Aerodrome for a test flight. Five people lost their lives in this accident; 2 pilots, 1 Technician, 1 Aircraft Maintenance Engineer, and 1 civilian.

== Investigation ==
The Aircraft Accident Investigation Bureau, India released the final investigation report in Dec 2018. The probable cause of the accident as per the report was a stall caused by lack of situational awareness due to spatial disorientation triggered by deteriorating weather, a transition from ILS (IMC) to visual flying (Partial VMC) and unexpected bank owing to differential engine power.

The aircraft VT-UPZ was previously owned by the Uttar Pradesh government. In 2014, the aircraft had an accident in Allahabad in which there was minor damage as per DGCA investigation report. Over the next decade, the aircraft changed ownership and was transported to Mumbai where the repair work was carried out with approval from DGCA.
