= Asalpha metro station =

Mumbai Metro's Blue Line 1 metro station

Asalpha असल्फा
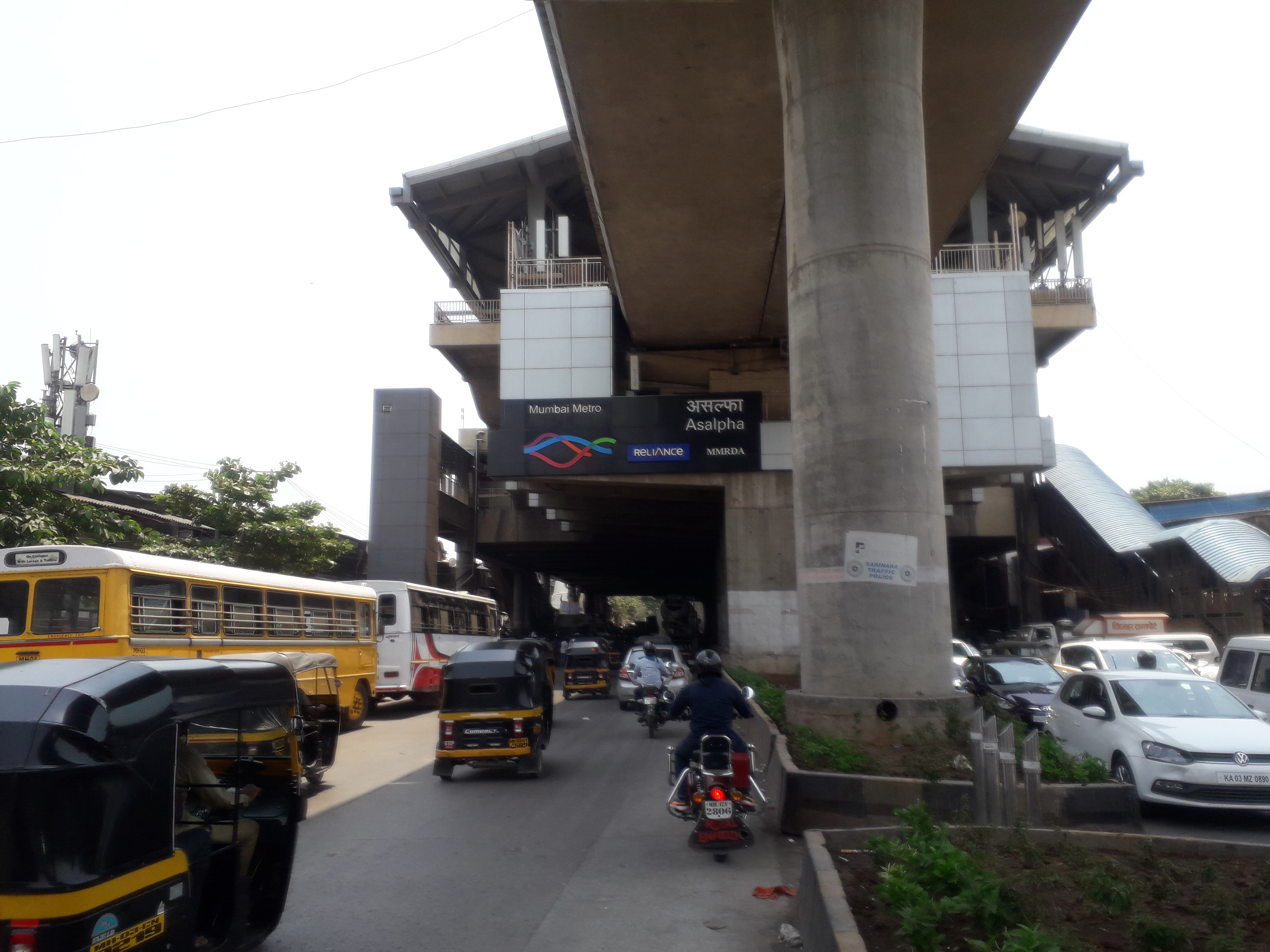
- Exterior view of the mezzanine level at Asalpha station on the Mumbai Metro

General information
- Location: Andheri-Ghatkopar Link Road, Ghatkopar (W), Near Maheshwari Temple, Mumbai, Maharashtra 400084
- Coordinates: 19°05′33″N 72°54′07″E
- Operator: Mumbai Metro One Pvt Ltd
- Line: Line 1
- Platforms: 2 side platforms

Construction
- Structure type: Elevated
- Parking: No
- Accessible: Yes
- Architect: Louis Berger

Other information
- Station code: ASA

History
- Opened: 8 June 2014; 12 years ago

Services
Preceding station	Mumbai Metro One	Following station
Saki Naka towards Versova	Line 1	Jagruti Nagar towards Ghatkopar
Route map
Blue Line
Location

Asalpha is an elevated metro station on the East-West Corridor of the Blue Line 1 of Mumbai Metro in Mumbai, India. It was opened to the public on 8 June 2014. Asalpha's metro station is the third last station towards Ghatkopar in the Metro Line 1. The Metro Station since then has served as an efficient and affordable alternative to reach Ghatkopar (the closest Railway Station from Asalpha area). The ticket to Ghatkopar costs only ₹10 per person.

== History ==
This station had originally been named Subhash Nagar, despite the fact that it was not located near the Subhash Nagar area. Following appeals from local residents, the MMRDA decided to change the name of the station to Asalpha in December 2013. The next station (towards Ghatkopar), which had originally been named Asalpha, was subsequently renamed Jagruti Nagar.

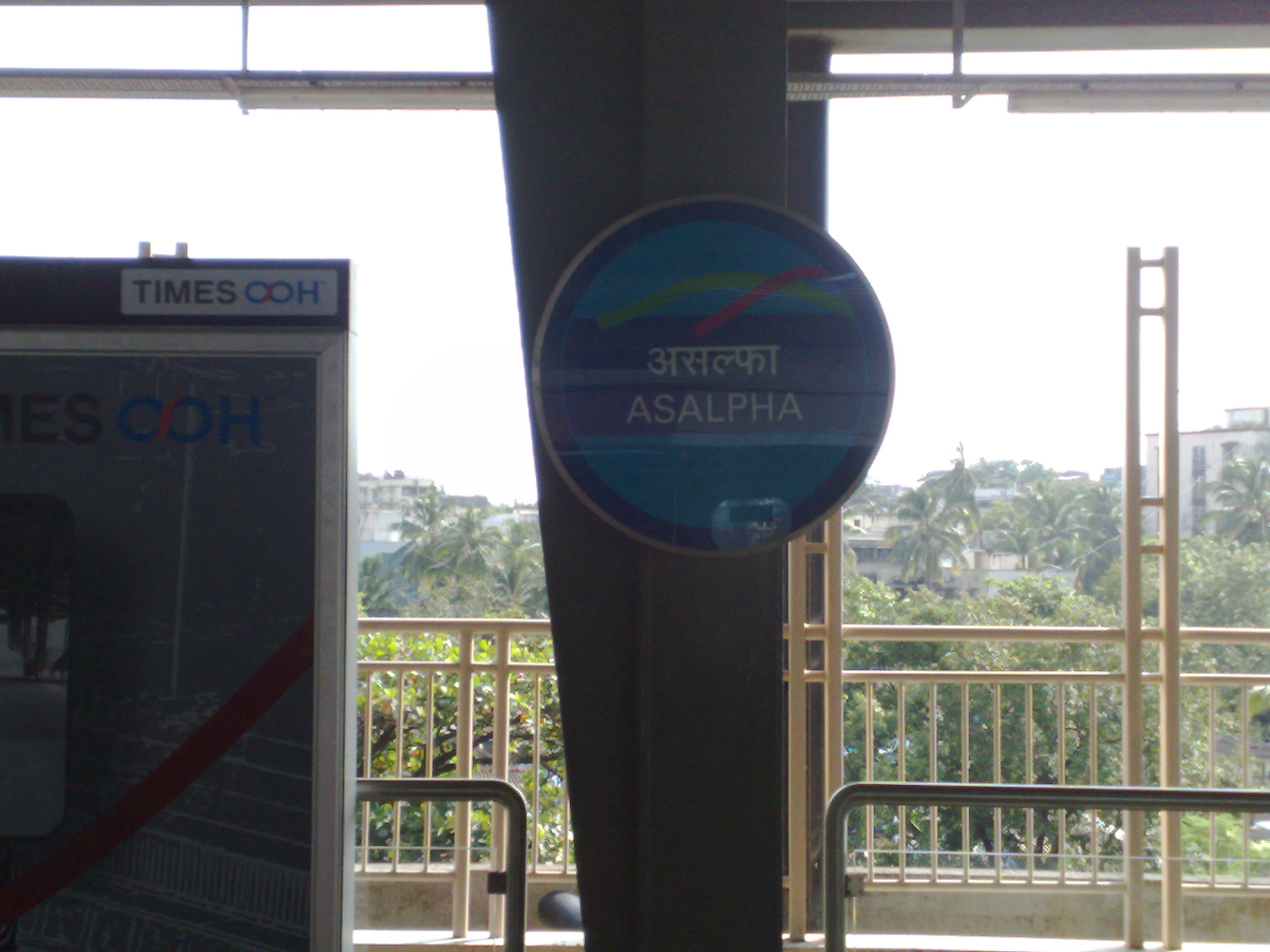
Asalpha metro station

== Station layout ==
2nd Floor	Side platform
2nd Floor	Platform 1	towards Ghatkopar →
2nd Floor	Platform 2	← towards Versova
2nd Floor	Side platform
1st Floor	Mezzanine	Fare control, station agent, Metro Card vending machines, crossover
Ground	Street level	Exit/Entrance

== Facilities ==
List of available ATM at Asalpha metro station are IDFC First Bank.

== Entrances and exits ==
- 1 - Towards Theresa High School
- 2 - Towards Mohili Village
- 3 - Towards Nari Seva Sadan Rd.
- 4 - Near Maheshwar Temple
- 5/6 - Towards Savarkar Nagar Road

== See also ==
- Public transport in Mumbai
- List of Mumbai Metro stations
- List of rapid transit systems in India
- List of Metro Systems
