= Flat rated =

Engine system

When an aircraft engine is flat rated it means that an engine of high power or thrust rating is constrained to a lower power or thrust rating. The engine output in this case will always remain the same, but when atmospheric conditions such as high temperatures and high altitude ("hot and high") reduce the output of the engine it has more headroom before it falls below the limited maximum output.

Gas turbines can produce more thrust with lower outside air temperatures. Flat rating for these temperatures keeps turbine temperatures lower, reducing maintenance costs. It also allows for keeping structural forces and asymmetric thrust, in case of an engine failure, within limits. Engines are typically flat rated for a range of equivalent sea level temperatures, such as ISA+15°C and below.

For example, the Garrett AiResearch TPE-331-5 engine originally fitted on the Dornier 228 produces 715 horsepower (533 kW). If the outside air temperature is above 20°C, the airplane's maximum speed is reduced by approximately 10 knots (19 km/h), because hotter air is less dense and thus produces less pressure inside the turbine. The Dornier 228 can also be fitted with the Garrett AiResearch TPE-331-10 conversion of the -5 engine which produces 1,000 horsepower (750 kW) but is limited (flat rated) to only 715. In this case the airplane will be able to maintain its top speed at temperatures above 30°C without the risk of exceeding the airplane's structural limits.
