= RAF Santa Cruz =

RAF Santa Cruz
- IATA: BOM; ICAO: VABB

Summary
- Airport type: Military
- Operator: Royal Air Force
- Location: Mumbai, Maharashtra, India
- Built: 1941
- In use: 1942–1947
- Elevation AMSL: 37 ft (11 m)
- Coordinates: 19°05′19″N 072°52′05″E

Map
- Location in India Santa Cruz (India)

Runways
| Direction | Length | | Surface |
| Direction | ft | m | Surface |
|---|---|---|---|
| 04/22 | 5,174 | 1,577 | Concrete |
| 09/27 | 5,220 | 1,590 | Concrete |
| 14/32 | 5,030 | 1,530 | Concrete |

External image
- A 1945-46 photo of RAF Santacruz taken from the air showing its three runways

Royal Air Force Santa Cruz or more simply Santa Cruz was a Royal Air Force station in Bombay (now called Mumbai), then British India which saw extensive use in the Second World War. The site is now Chhatrapati Shivaji Maharaj International Airport.

== History ==
The airfield was constructed in the 1930s when the nearby Juhu Aerodrome, located close by, could not cope with the fighters, bombers and other large transport planes of the Air Force, that required longer and stronger runways. Santa Cruz Airfield covered an area of about 1,500 acres (607 hectares). It had three runways originally and built as a standard Class A airfield, the main feature of which was a set of three intersecting concrete runways placed in a triangular pattern. The technical area and apron were located to the south between 09/27 and 14/32 and connected to a 50 feet (15 m) wide perimeter track. After the end of the War, the airport was handed over to the Director General of Civil Aviation for civil operations and continues civilian operations.

== Squadrons ==
Numerous fighter squadrons and support units were stationed at Santa Cruz from 1942 to 1947.

| Unit | Dates | Aircraft | Notes |
|---|---|---|---|
| No. 159 Squadron RAF | October 1945 - June 1946 | Consolidated Liberator VIII | Detachment from RAF Salbani, West Bengal |
| No. 203 Squadron RAF | 15 November 1943 - 9 October 1944 | Vickers Wellington | |
| No. 217 Squadron RAF | April 1943 - April 1944 | Bristol Beaufort I | Detachment from RAF Vavuniya |
| No. 244 Squadron RAF | March 1944 and May 1945 | Vickers Wellington XIII | Detachment from RAF Masirah |

== Current use ==
It is now part of the Chhatrapati Shivaji Maharaj International Airport.

== See also ==
- List of former Royal Air Force stations
