= Jagruti Nagar metro station =

Mumbai Metro's Blue Line 1 metro station

Jagruti Nagar जागृती नगर
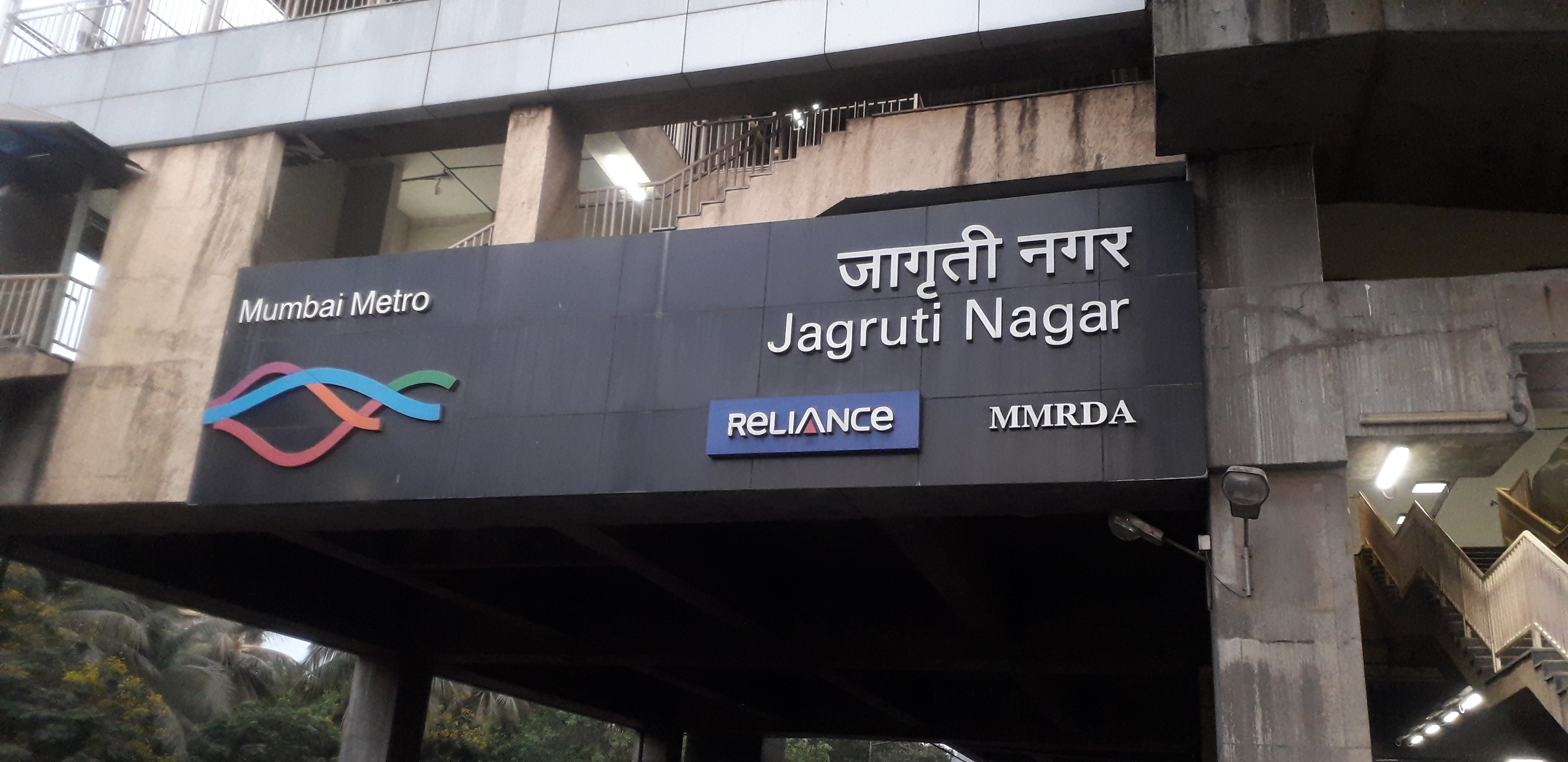
- Exterior view of the mezzanine level at Jagruti Nagar station

General information
- Location: Andheri Ghatkopar Link Rd, near Maneklal Estate, Ghatkopar (W), Mumbai, Maharashtra 400084
- Coordinates: 19°05′33″N 72°54′07″E
- Operator: Mumbai Metro One Pvt Ltd
- Line: Line 1
- Platforms: 2 side platforms

Construction
- Structure type: Elevated
- Parking: No
- Cycle facilities: Yes
- Accessible: Yes
- Architect: Louis Berger

Other information
- Station code: JNG

History
- Opened: 8 June 2014; 12 years ago

Services
Preceding station	Mumbai Metro One	Following station
Asalpha towards Versova	Line 1	Ghatkopar Terminus
Route map
Blue Line
Location

Jagruti Nagar is an elevated metro station on the East-West Corridor of the Blue Line 1 of Mumbai Metro in Mumbai, India. It was opened to the public on 8 June 2014.

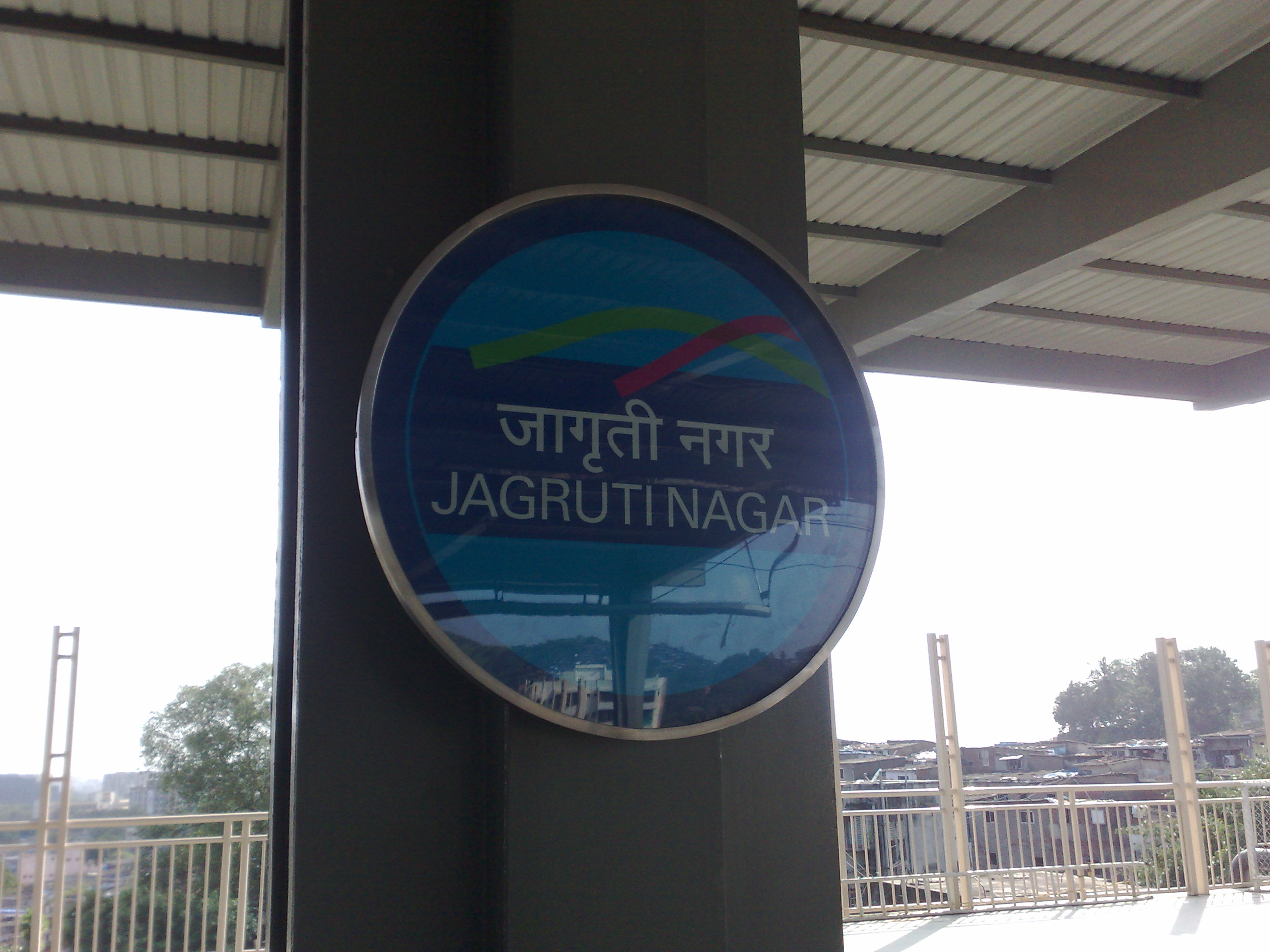
Jagruti Nagar metro station

== History ==
The Asalpha station had originally been named Subhash Nagar, despite the fact that it was not located near the Subhash Nagar area. Following appeals from local residents, the MMRDA decided to rename the station to Asalpha in December 2013. The next station (towards Ghatkopar), which had originally been named Asalpha, was subsequently renamed Jagruti Nagar.

== Station layout ==
2nd Floor	Side platform
2nd Floor	Platform 1	towards Ghatkopar →
2nd Floor	Platform 2	← towards Versova
2nd Floor	Side platform
1st Floor	Mezzanine	Fare control, station agent, Metro Card vending machines, crossover
Ground	Street level	Exit/Entrance

== Facilities ==
List of available ATM at Jagruti Nagar metro station are

== Entrances and exits ==
- 1 -Towards R City Mall, Shreyas Cinema
- 2 - Towards RBK Road
- 3 -
- 4 -
- 5 -

== See also ==
- Public transport in Mumbai
- List of Mumbai Metro stations
- List of rapid transit systems in India
- List of Metro Systems
