= Japan Air Lines Flight 472 (1972) =

1972 aviation accident in Bombay, India

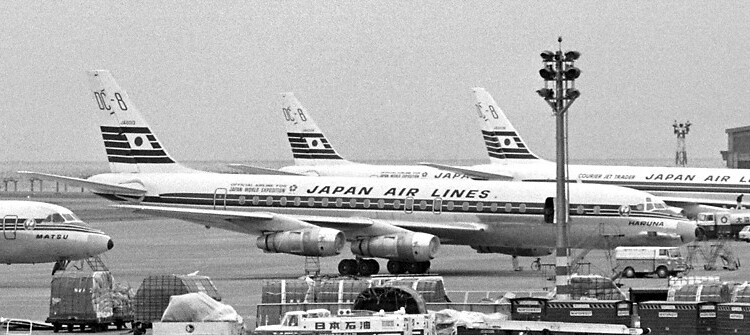
- JA8013, the aircraft involved in the accident in 1969, with a previous livery

Accident
- Date: 24 September 1972
- Summary: Runway excursion due to pilot error
- Site: Juhu Aerodrome, Bombay, India; 19°05′57″N 72°50′20″E

Aircraft
- Aircraft type: Douglas DC-8-53
- Aircraft name: Haruna
- Operator: Japan Air Lines
- IATA flight No.: JL472
- ICAO flight No.: JAL472
- Call sign: JAPAN AIR 472
- Registration: JA8013
- Flight origin: London Heathrow Airport, London, United Kingdom
- 1st stopover: Frankfurt Airport, Frankfurt, Germany
- 2nd stopover: Leonardo da Vinci-Fiumicino Airport, Rome, Italy
- 3rd stopover: Beirut Rafic Hariri International Airport, Beirut, Lebanon
- 4th stopover: Mehrabad International Airport, Tehran, Iran
- 5th stopover: Santacruz Airport, Bombay, India
- 6th stopover: Don Mueang International Airport, Bangkok, Thailand
- Last stopover: Kai Tak Airport, Hong Kong
- Destination: Haneda Airport, Tokyo, Japan
- Occupants: 122
- Passengers: 108
- Crew: 14
- Fatalities: 0
- Injuries: 11
- Survivors: 122

Japan Air Lines Flight 472 was a flight from London to Tokyo via Frankfurt, Rome, Beirut, Tehran, Bombay, Bangkok and Hong Kong. On September 24, 1972, the Douglas DC-8 landed at Juhu Aerodrome near Bombay, India instead of the city's much larger Santacruz Airport (now Chhatrapati Shivaji International Airport) and overran the runway, resulting in the aircraft being written off after being damaged beyond economic repair. All 122 on board survived, although nine passengers and two crew members were injured.

== Aircraft ==
The aircraft involved was a Douglas DC-8-53, registration JA8013, first flown in 1964.

== Accident ==
The flight departed London 20 minutes late. By the time it left Tehran for Bombay, it was 80 minutes behind schedule. The crew planned to execute an ILS approach to Santacruz Airport, Bombay. However, the air traffic controller (ATC) asked the crew, "Can you see the runway?", to which they replied, "Yes, we can". Since the weather was good around the airport that day, the ATC instructed, "VFR approach please".

After this, Flight 472 flew past Runway 09 on the west side of Santacruz Airport while descending, and executed a 360-degree turn in order to approach again from the west and land. However, when it did land at 06:50 local time (01:20 UTC), it was in fact landing on Runway 08 of Juhu Aerodrome. Juhu is 3.7 kilometres (2.3 mi; 2.0 nmi) west of Santacruz, and for use by small aircraft only. Runway 08 of Juhu was only 1,143 metres (3,750 ft) long, too short for the large aircraft operating Flight 472.

After deploying the thrust reversers, the captain realized the mistake and immediately deployed spoilers and applied maximum braking power, but an overrun was inevitable. The DC-8 overshot the runway, breaking off both engines on the port wing, and damaging the front and main landing gear, causing the nose of the aircraft to dive into the ground. The wreckage caught fire, but the fire was soon put out by fire extinguishers.

At the time of the accident, there were 14 crew and 108 passengers on board. The aircraft was damaged beyond economic repair. 2 cockpit crew and 9 passengers (all non-Japanese) were reported injured. It was the second Japan Airlines accident in India, coming just two months after the fatal crash of Japan Air Lines Flight 471 in Delhi.

== Cause ==
The accident was attributed to pilot error. However, the Indian authorities were also blamed for operating an airport for small aircraft so close to Santacruz, causing confusion (see similar incidents below). Another factor was that during the 360-degree turn Flight 472 faced the sun and morning mist, and the cockpit crew lost sight of the runway. When they suddenly saw the runway of Juhu Aerodrome, they mistook it for the runway of Santacruz, and landed on it.

== See also ==
- 1953 British Overseas Airways Corporation (BOAC) de Havilland Comet G-ALYR crash
- 2006 Poznań-Krzesiny military airbase incidents.
- 2019 Saha Airlines Boeing 707 crash
