= Chakala =

- Neighbourhood
- Location within Mumbai
- Coordinates: 19°6′41″N 72°51′39″E
- Country: India
- State: Maharashtra
- District: Mumbai Suburban
- City: Mumbai

Government
  - Type: Municipal Corporation
  - Body: Brihanmumbai Municipal Corporation (MCGM)

Languages
  - Official: Marathi
- Time zone: UTC+5:30 (IST)
- Area code: 022

Chakala is a locality in the suburb of Andheri in Mumbai. Administratively, it is a village in the Andheri taluka of the Mumbai Suburban district.

== History ==
The locality draws its name from Chaquelem, one of the 13 villages in the vicinity of Marol that converted to Catholicism in 1588 after the advent of the Portuguese on Salsette Island.

Chakala had a station on the Salsette–Trombay Railway, which was dismantled after the rail line closed down in 1934.

== Transport ==
It is served by the Western Express Highway and Chakala (J. B. Nagar) stations on Blue Line 1 of the Mumbai Metro.

== Economy ==
Chakala is an industrial locality, and is home to many other small scale businesses. It is close to the airport, and the Nepal Airlines has its Mumbai office in the Rathour House in Chakala.

== Schools and Colleges ==
The following are the educational institutions located at Chakala:

- Guru Nanak Mission High School
- Holy Family High School

== Religious Institutions ==
The following is a list of churches and temples in Chakala:

- Gurdwara Guru Nanak Punjabi Sabha Chakala
- Holy Family Church
