= Airport Road metro station =

Mumbai Metro One rapid transit station

Airport Road एअरपोर्ट रोड
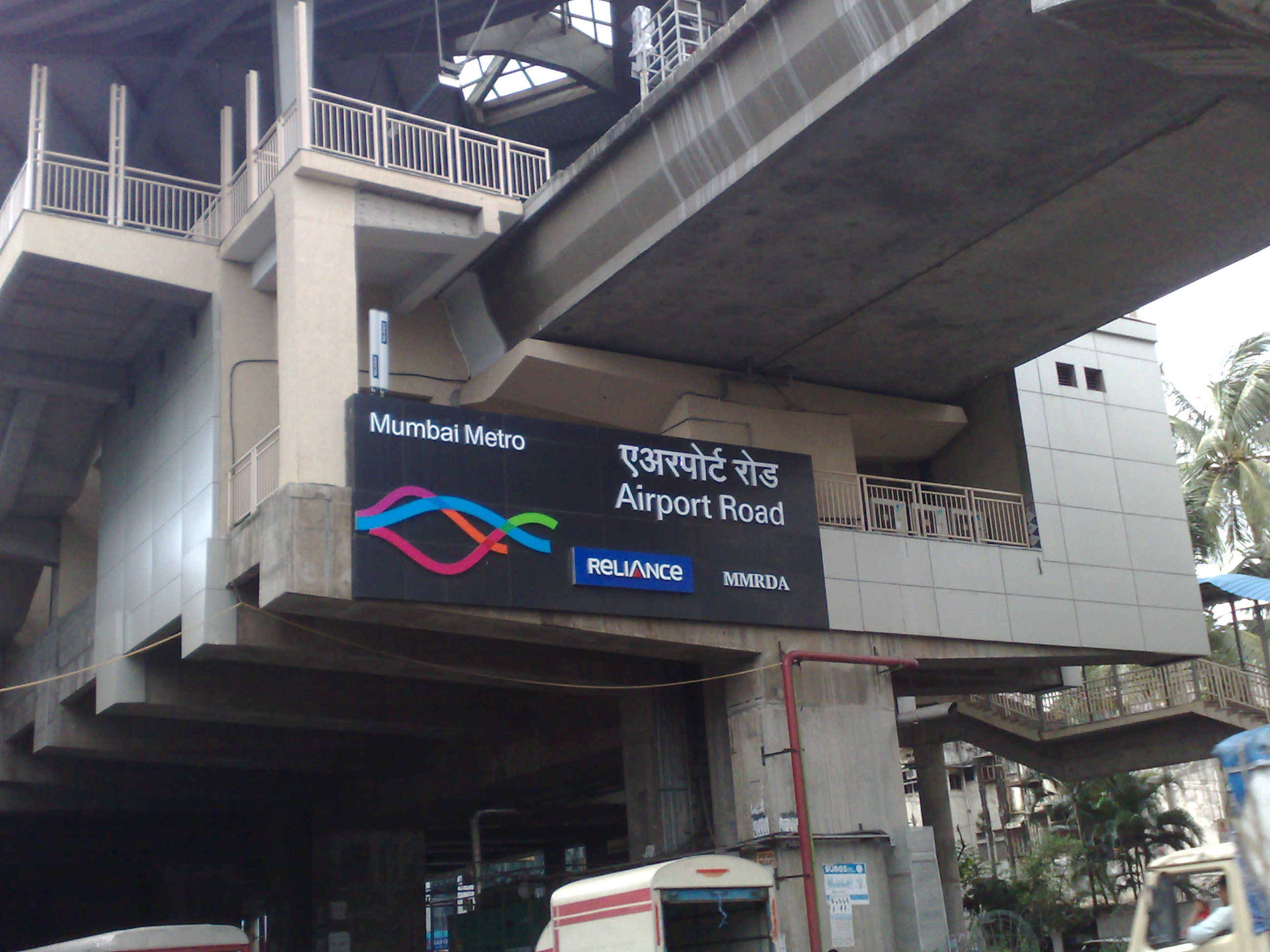

General information
- Location: Andheri-Kurla Road, Andheri (E), Near Leela Business Park, Mumbai, Maharashtra 400059
- Coordinates: 19°06′37″N 72°52′29″E
- Operator: Mumbai Metro One Pvt Ltd
- Line: Line 1
- Platforms: 2 side platforms

Construction
- Structure type: Elevated
- Accessible: Yes

Other information
- Station code: APR

History
- Opened: 8 June 2014; 12 years ago

Services
Preceding station	Mumbai Metro One	Following station
Chakala (J. B. Nagar) towards Versova	Line 1	Marol Naka towards Ghatkopar
Location

Airport Road is an elevated metro station on the East-West Corridor of the Blue Line 1 of Mumbai Metro in Andheri, Mumbai. It was opened to the public on 8 June 2014.

Upon the metro line being commissioned for passengers, the BEST launched a special bus service Metro Pheri 1 which brings commuters from a distance to the closest of the 3 metro stations it serves. It runs from SEEPZ and via the B cross road arrives at Chakala (J. B. Nagar) metro station runs parallel to the metro line alongside Andheri Kurla Road touching Airport Road metro station and Marol Naka metro station then via Marol Maroshi Road back to SEEPZ.

== Station layout ==
2nd Floor	Side platform
2nd Floor	Platform 1	towards Ghatkopar (Marol Naka) →
2nd Floor	Platform 2	← towards Versova (Chakala (J. B. Nagar))
2nd Floor	Side platform
1st Floor	Mezzanine	Fare control, station agent, Metro Card vending machines, crossover
Ground	Street level	Exit/Entrance

== Facilities ==
List of available ATM at Airport Road metro station. Domino's, Jumboking outlets are available

== Entrances and exits ==
- 1 - Near Leela Business Park, HDFC Ergo
- 2 - St. John Church Road/Exit for Mumbai International Airport
- 3 - Near Marol Lions Club
- 4 - Near The Leela Hotel
- 5 - Near Indian Oil Petrol Pump
- 6 - Near Leela Hotel Back Gate

== Gallery ==
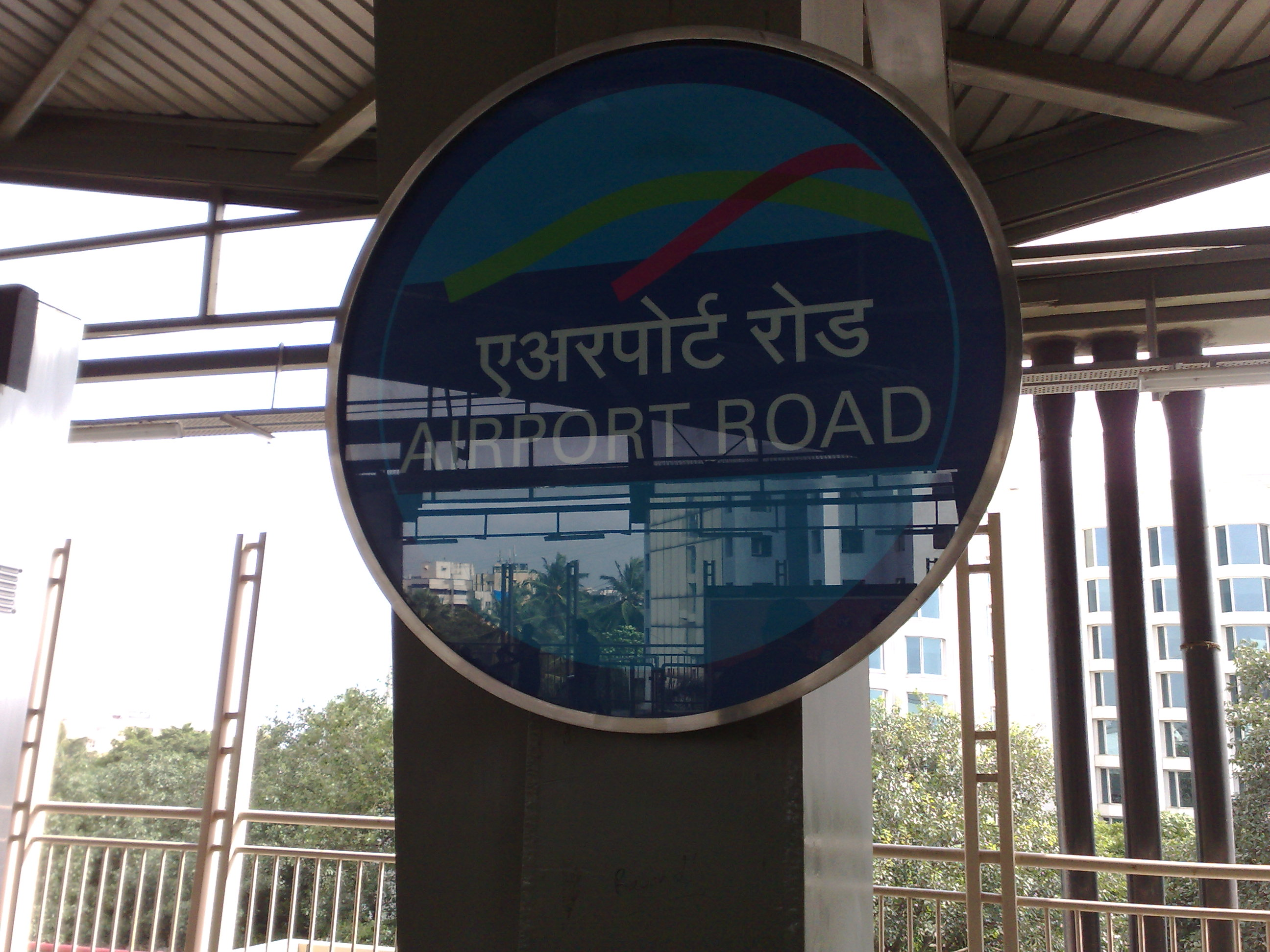
Airport Road metro station roundel

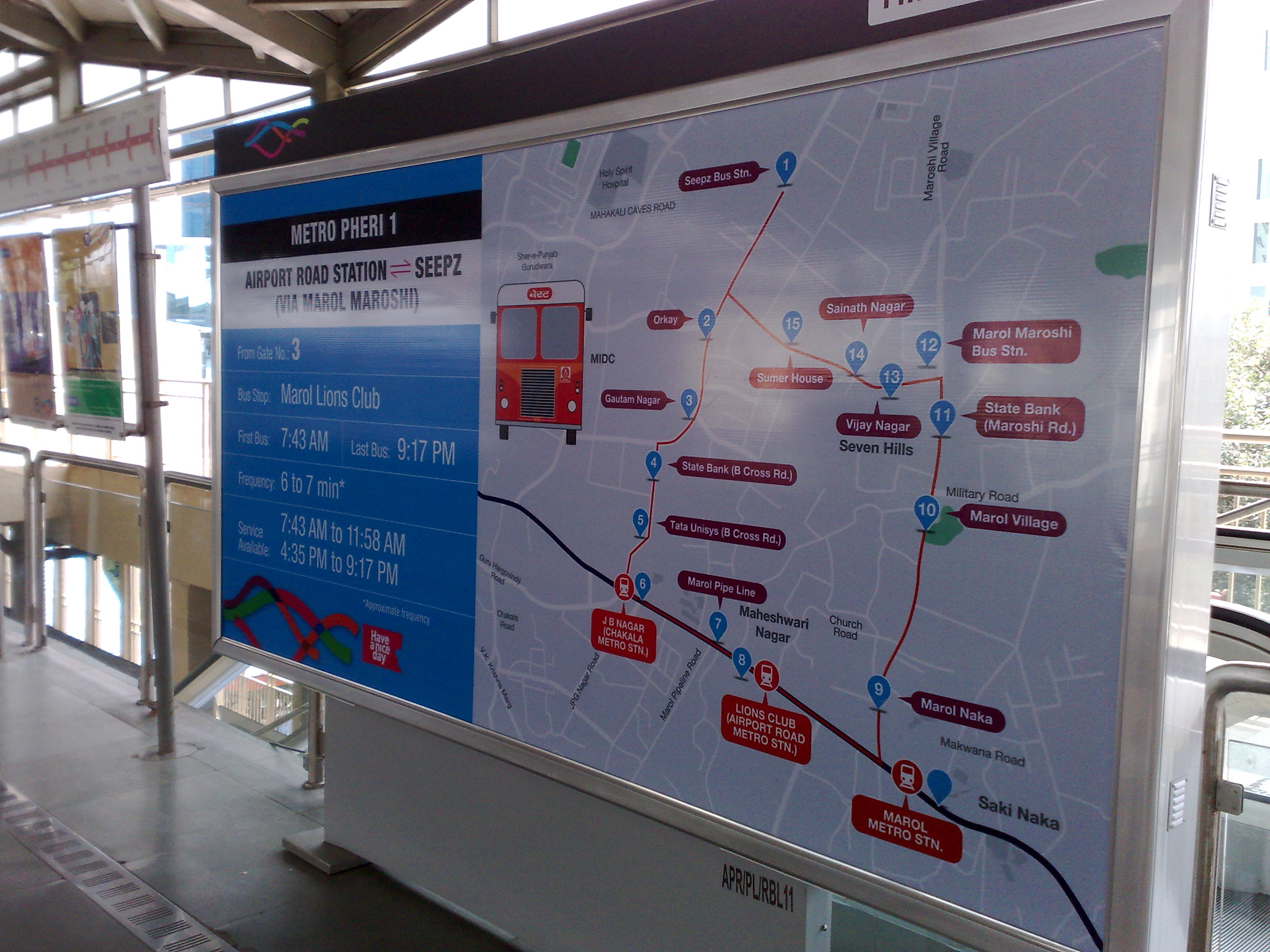
Metro Pheri 1 route map

== See also ==
- Public transport in Mumbai
- List of Mumbai Metro stations
- List of rapid transit systems in India
- List of Metro Systems
- Chhatrapati Shivaji Maharaj International Airport
