= Frodo Adventure Camera =

Wearable adventure camera

Frodo
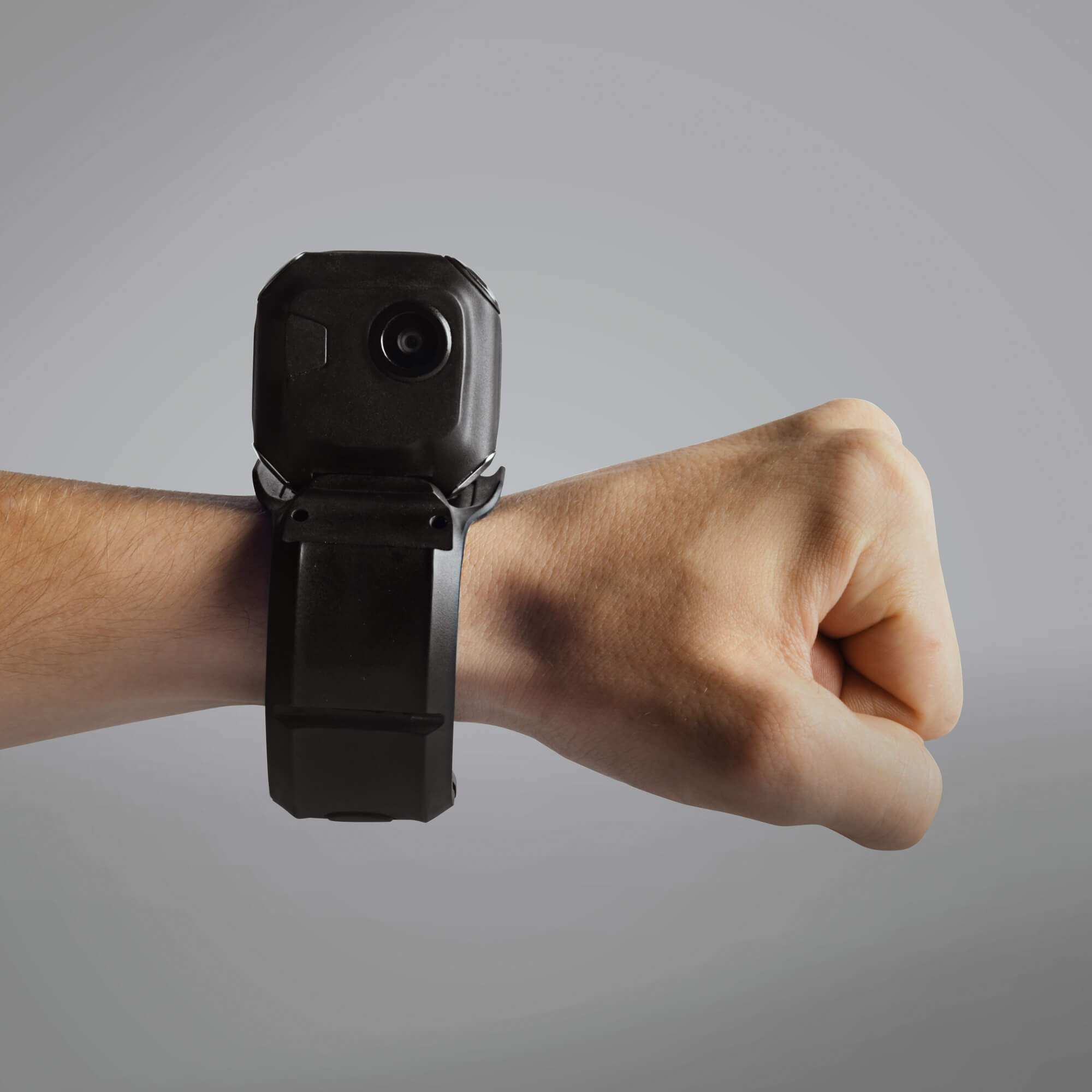
- Type: Adventure Camera
- Manufacturer: Nexgear Technology Pvt. Ltd.
- Website: http://www.frodocam.com/

Frodo Camera is a wearable (strap-on) adventure camera which is accompanied with Mobile Applications to automatically sync and edit videos. It is designed by Nexgear Technology Pvt. Ltd, founded in 2014 and based out of Andheri Saki Naka, Mumbai, India.

== History ==
Frodo Adventure Camera was conceived to address the problem of lack of skill and time to edit videos, and bulky video-making gadgets and accessories. Frodo was launched by IIT Bombay alumni, Amardeep Singh and Panjab University alumni, Rahul Vats in 2014. The first working prototype of the camera was unveiled at the Consumer Electronics Show, Las Vegas, 2016 in the Eureka Park section. Frodo was listed in the Top 5 Hardware start-ups in the Q-Prize competition by Qualcomm for the Make In India campaign.

== Concept ==
Frodo Adventure Camera works by shooting a video and connecting it to the mobile application. The application automatically syncs the videos, and intelligently edits as per your choice. The app uses evolutionary algorithm to scan the clip, and choose the best parts for the kind of video the user is looking for. It offers different styles to create the video of the pace and tonality required by the user. The video can then be shared through the mobile application itself. The camera supports HD recording.

== Technical specifications ==
Feature	Specification
Video resolution	Full HD, 1080p 30fps
Field of View	Wide, 120 degree
Video Format	H.264, MP4 format
Photo resolution	8 MP, 3264x2448 pixels
F-stop	f/2.6
Motion Sensors	6-axis
Wi-Fi	802.11 b/g/n
Bluetooth	4.0 LE

== Funding ==
Nexgear raised an angel round of funding in 2015 from Powai Lake Ventures and GrowX Ventures to build Frodo.
