= Gurdwara Guru Nanak Punjabi Sabha Chakala =

Gurdwara established by Guru Nanak Punjabi Sabha in 1956

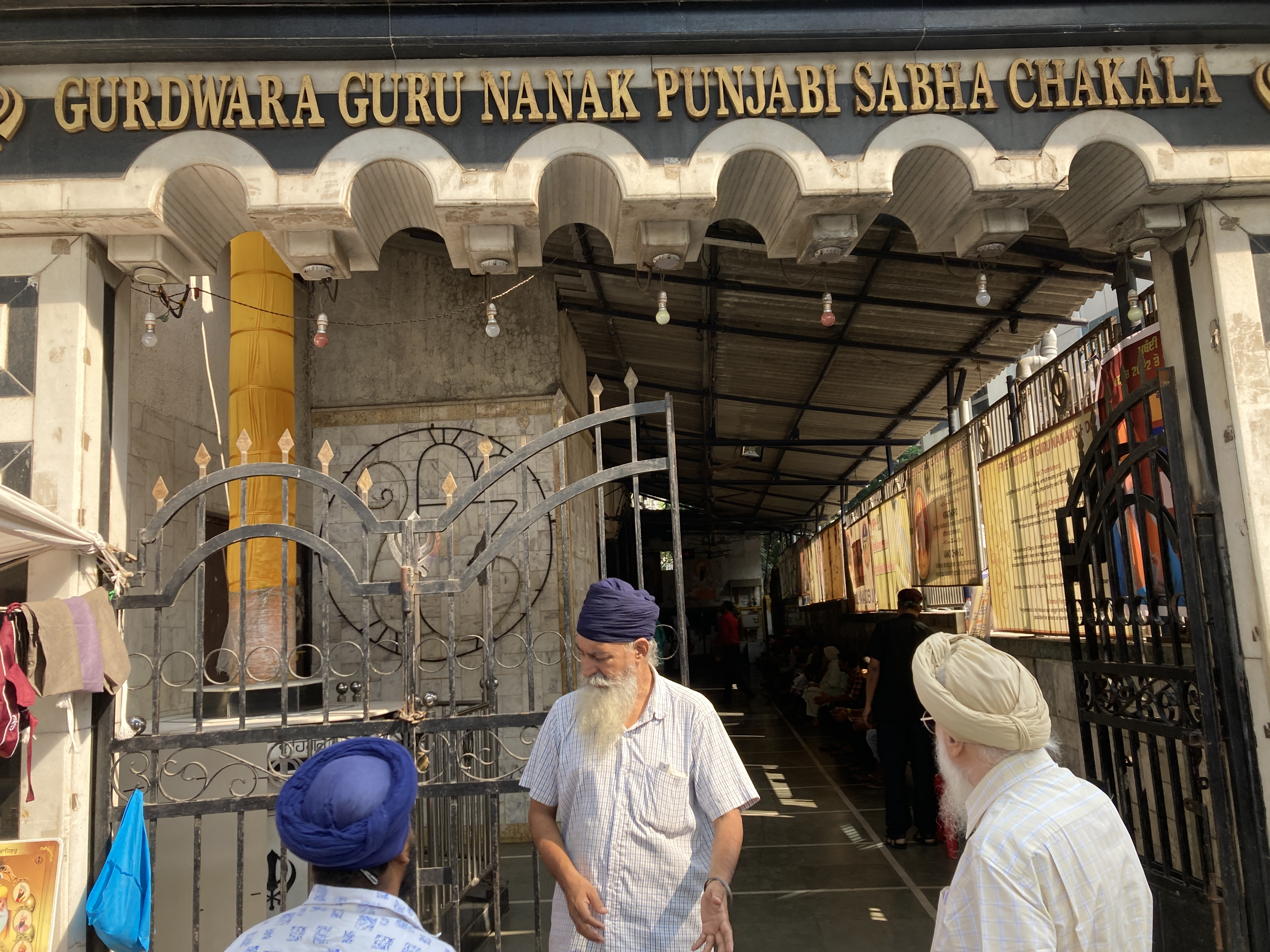

General information
- Architectural style: Sikh architecture
- Location: Mumbai, Maharashtra, India
- Coordinates: 19°06′53.6″N 72°51′29.5″E
- Construction started: 1956
- Completed: 1957

Gurdwara Guru Nanak Punjabi Sabha Chakala is a Sikh Gurdwara in Chakala in Mumbai. The Guru Nanak Punjabi Sabha was founded by Shamsher Singh Jolly (1922–1992) to establish the Gurdwara, the Charitable Dispensary and the Guru Nanak Mission High School. The Gurdwara and Charitable Dispensary is located on Andheri Kurla Road, Amrit Nagar, Andheri East, Mumbai - 400093, Opposite Holy Family Church, Chakala. The Guru Nanak Mission High School is located at 5/B, Mahakali Caves Road, Chakala, Gundavali, Near Sai Palace Hotel, Andheri East, Mumbai - 400093.

== History ==
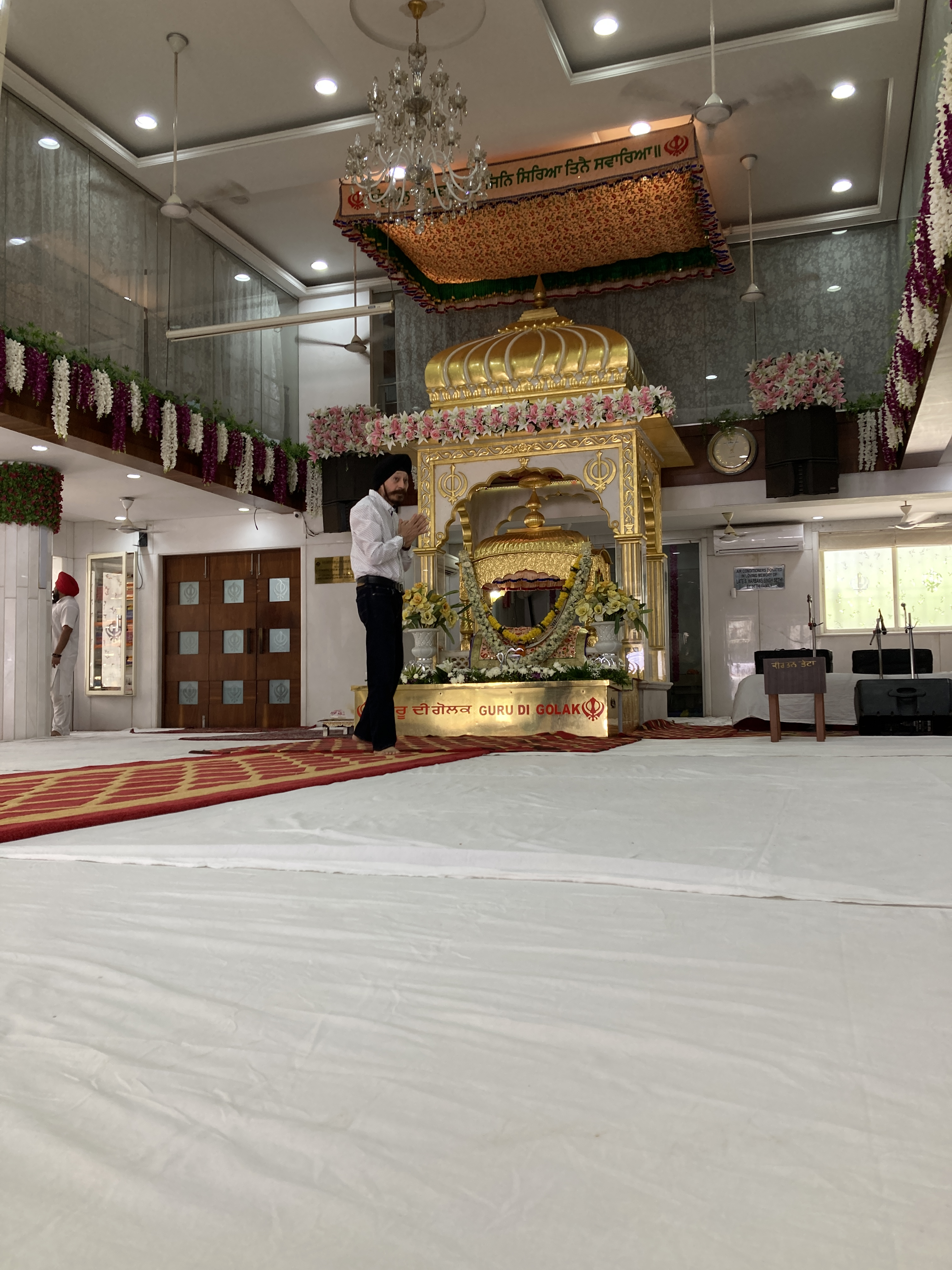
Darbar Hall, Gurdwara Guru Nanak Punjabi Sabha Chakala

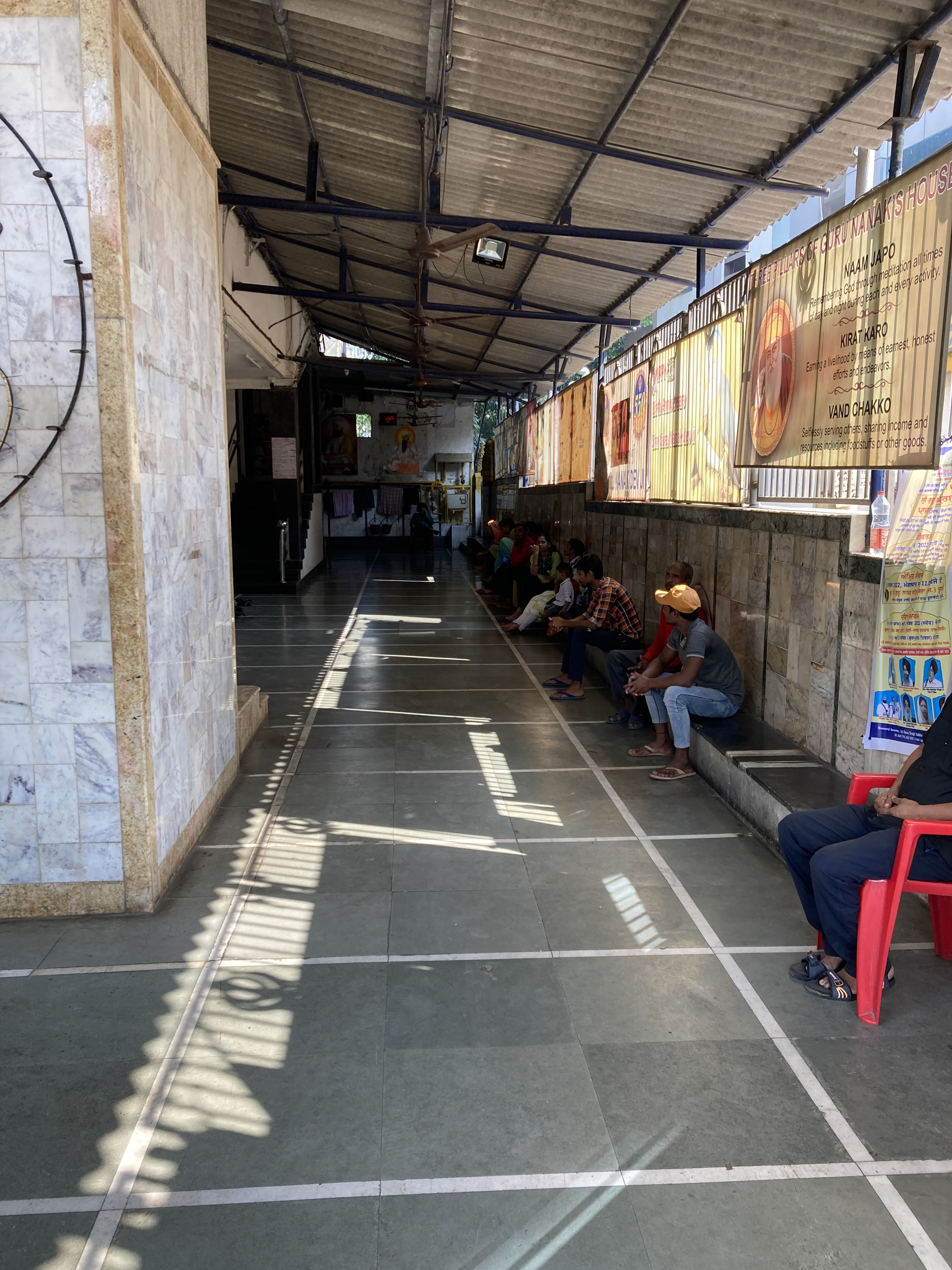
Gurdwara Guru Nanak Punjabi Sabha Chakala, Entrance Hall

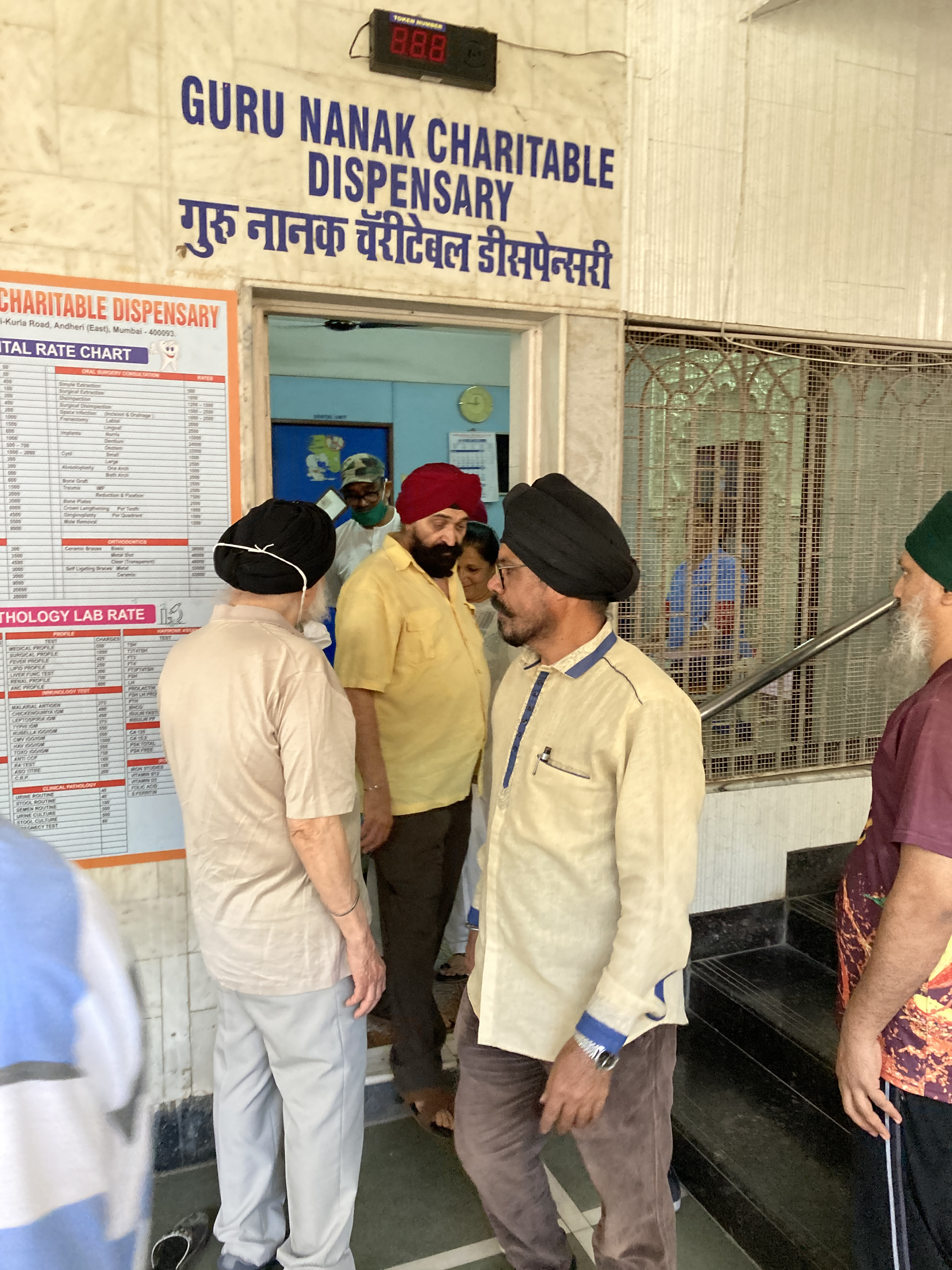
Charitable Dispensary at Gurdwara Guru Nanak Punjabi Sabha, Chakala

The land for the Gurdwara was originally purchased in 1955 and construction began in 1956. The Gurdwara, Charitable Dispensary and the Mission High School were all operating by 1967. The school, which occupied the first floor did eventually become too big for the available space, and had to be relocated. A new site was purchased in 1985 and the school moved to its present location on Mahakali Caves Road in the year 2000.

In 1955, Shamsher Singh Jolly was transferred to N J Wadia Dispensary on S V Road in Andheri as the Chief Medical Officer. He was provided with accommodation, which consisted of a bungalow and an outhouse. Jolly started to use the outhouse for Kirtan because there was a large community of Sikhs in the area, and the next nearest Gurdwara was some distance away in Khar. Funds were raised to buy some land in 1955, with work on its construction beginning in 1956 by first laying the foundations and going on to build the Gurdwara, Charitable Dispensary and eventually the School. To ensure that the Gurdwara remained self-sufficient financially, a significant section of the ground floor was made available to rent as a shopfront, which it still is to this day.
