= Saki Naka metro station =

Mumbai Metro's Blue Line 1 metro station

Saki Naka साकी नाका
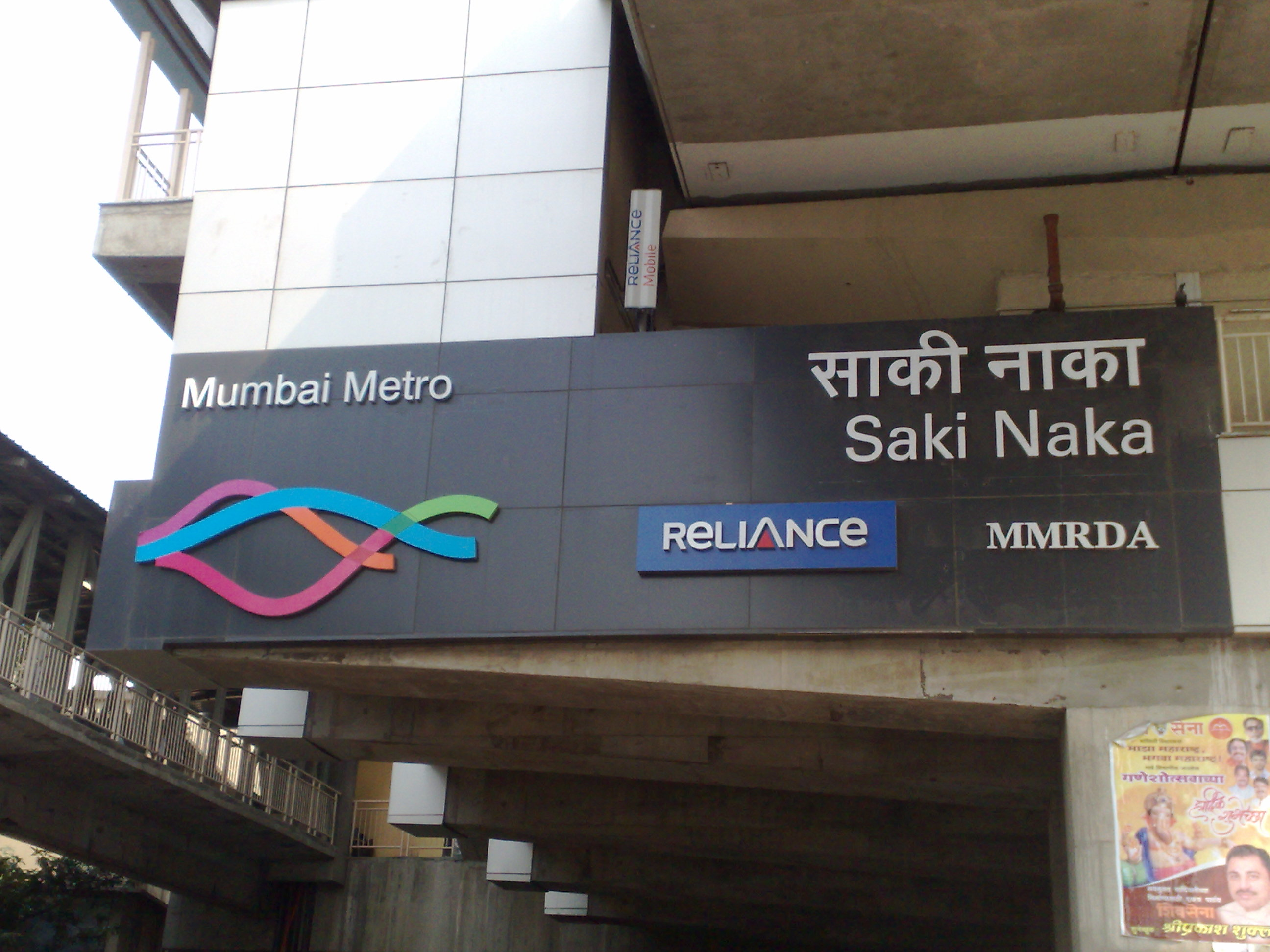
- Exterior view of the mezzanine level at Saki Naka station

General information
- Location: Andheri – Ghatkopar Road, Saki Naka, Andheri (East), Mumbai
- Coordinates: 19°06′13″N 72°53′17″E
- Operator: Mumbai Metro One Pvt Ltd
- Line: Line 1
- Platforms: 2 side platforms

Construction
- Structure type: Elevated
- Parking: No
- Accessible: Yes

Other information
- Station code: SAN

History
- Opened: 8 June 2014; 12 years ago

Passengers
- 2023: 43,915 daily
- Rank: 3 out of 12

Services
Preceding station	Mumbai Metro One	Following station
Marol Naka towards Versova	Line 1	Asalpha towards Ghatkopar
Route map
Blue Line
Location

Saki Naka is an elevated metro station on the East-West Corridor of the Blue Line 1 of Mumbai Metro serving the Saki Naka neighbourhood of Andheri in Mumbai, India. It was opened to the public on 8 June 2014.

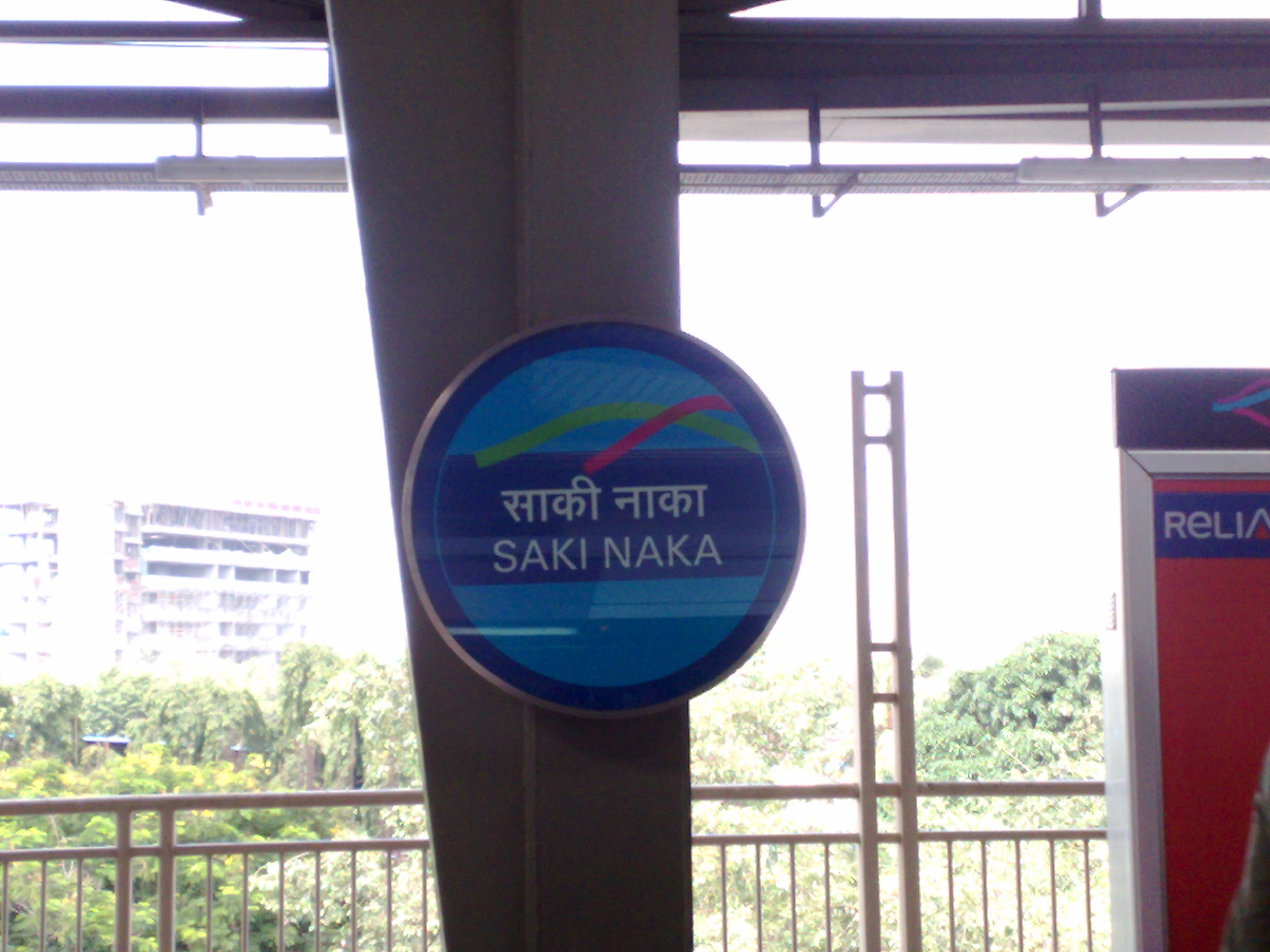
Sakinaka Metro Station

== Station layout ==
2nd Floor	Side platform
2nd Floor	Platform 1	towards Ghatkopar →
2nd Floor	Platform 2	← towards Versova
2nd Floor	Side platform
1st Floor	Mezzanine	Fare control, station agent, Metro Card vending machines, crossover
Ground	Street level	Exit/Entrance

== Facilities ==
List of available ATM near Saki Naka metro station are

- Axis Bank
- Bank of India
- ICICI Bank
- IndusInd Bank
- Punjab National Bank

== Entrances and exits ==
There are 4 exits to Saki Naka metro station. Gates 5 and 6 are towards Andheri Kurla road, gates 1 and 3 are towards Powai, while the rest are towards 90 feet road and Ghatkopar.

- 1 - Toward Sakinaka junction, Near Bluestar
- 2 - Toward Gane
- 3 - Near Maharashtra Weighing Scale
- 4 - Towards 90 Fee
- 5 - Near Holiday Inn
- 6 - Near Holiday Inn, Toward Sagar Tech Plaza

== See also ==
- Public transport in Mumbai
- List of Mumbai Metro stations
- List of rapid transit systems in India
- List of Metro Systems
