= Marol =

- Neighbourhood
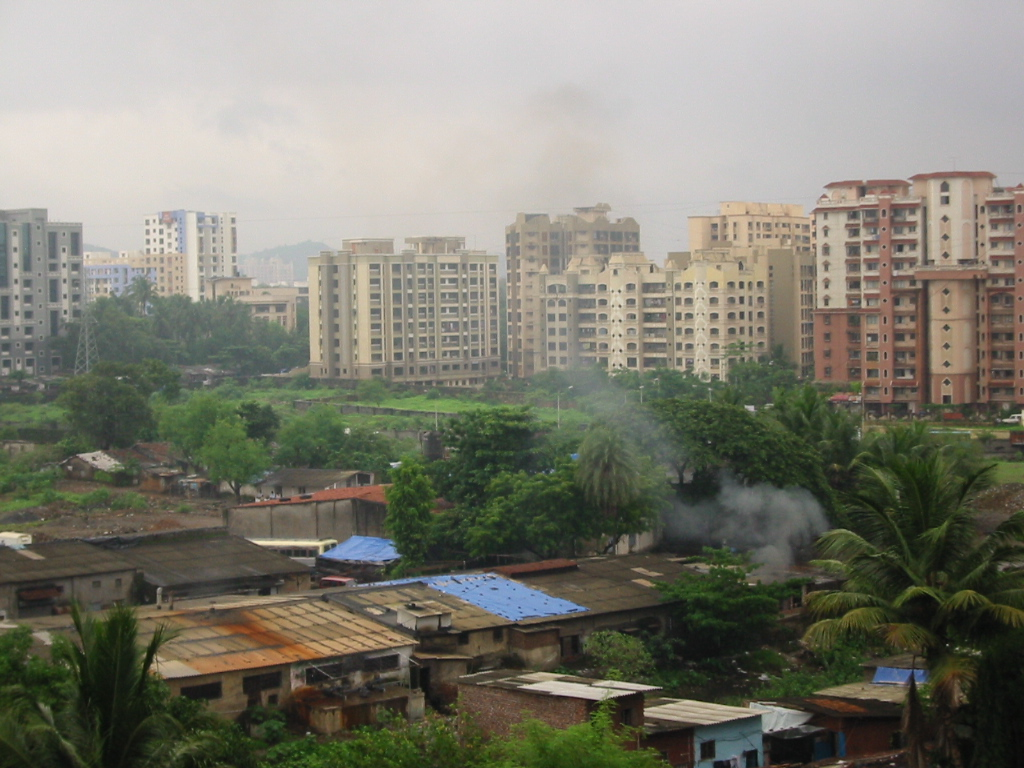

- Location in Mumbai, India
- Coordinates: 19.119219°N 72.882743°E
- Country: India
- State: Maharashtra
- District: Mumbai Suburban
- City: Mumbai
- Suburb: Andheri
- Ward: K-East

Government
  - Type: Municipal Corporation
  - Body: Brihanmumbai Municipal Corporation (MCGM)
- Elevation: 16 m (52 ft)

Languages
  - Official: Marathi
- Time zone: UTC+5:30 (IST)
- PIN: 400 059
- Area code: 022
- Civic agency: BMC

Marol is a locality in the suburb of Andheri (East) in Mumbai, India.

== History ==
Marol is mentioned as the name of a village in Mahikavatichi Bakhar, a 15th-17th century Marathi-language text of doubtful veracity. According to the text, in the 13th century, Nagarshah - the king of Ghandivi (Gandevi) - conquered the present-day Mumbai region. Three of his relatives demanded the villages of Malad, Marol and Thane as fiefs as a reward for their good performance in this military campaign. When Nagarshah refused their demand, they allied with king Ramdev-rao (Rama-deva) of Devagiri. The area briefly came under the control of Ramdev-rao's son Bimb-dev (Bhima), but Nagarshah's family soon regained control over it, and ruled as a vassal of the Delhi Sultanate in the 14th century. Subsequently, the Mumbai area was successively ruled by some local families, the Muzaffarids of Gujarat, and the Portuguese. Under the Portuguese rule, Marol had a large number of East Indians, who continued to be prominent during the succeeding British rule.

== Geography ==
Marol consists of the areas Marol village, Marol Naka, Marol Pipeline, Marol Depot, Marol Maroshi, Military Road, Bhavaninagar, Vijay Nagar, Marol Police Camp, parts of JB Nagar and parts of Marol MIDC. It is near to the international airport. The Marol-Maroshi Road stretches from Marol Naka up to Maroshi Naka (in Aarey colony), beyond which is the Picnic Spot. Marol Mapkhan Nagar and the Marol Church Road are the two diversions, the latter one also leads to Marol Pipeline.

Marol Village is home to a large number of Christians, with the St. John the Evangelist Church which has been established since 1579 and its high school.

Marol Fire Brigade is at Marol Naka.

Police Camp is at the end of Marol and is home to the families of people working for the Maharashtra Police. It is mainly the base camp for the State Armed Constabulary. It also has a Police Training Centre where police recruitment is held and newly recruited officers receive their training.

The oldest housing colony in the area is a group of 11 buildings on Military Road called Blossom Society. The first occupants arrived here in 1968.

== Transport ==
=== Roads ===
Marol is strategically located close to the Western Express Highway and in close proximity to Andheri railway station. Located off the Andheri-Kurla and Andheri-Ghatkopar link roads, it has good east–west connectivity.

=== Buses ===
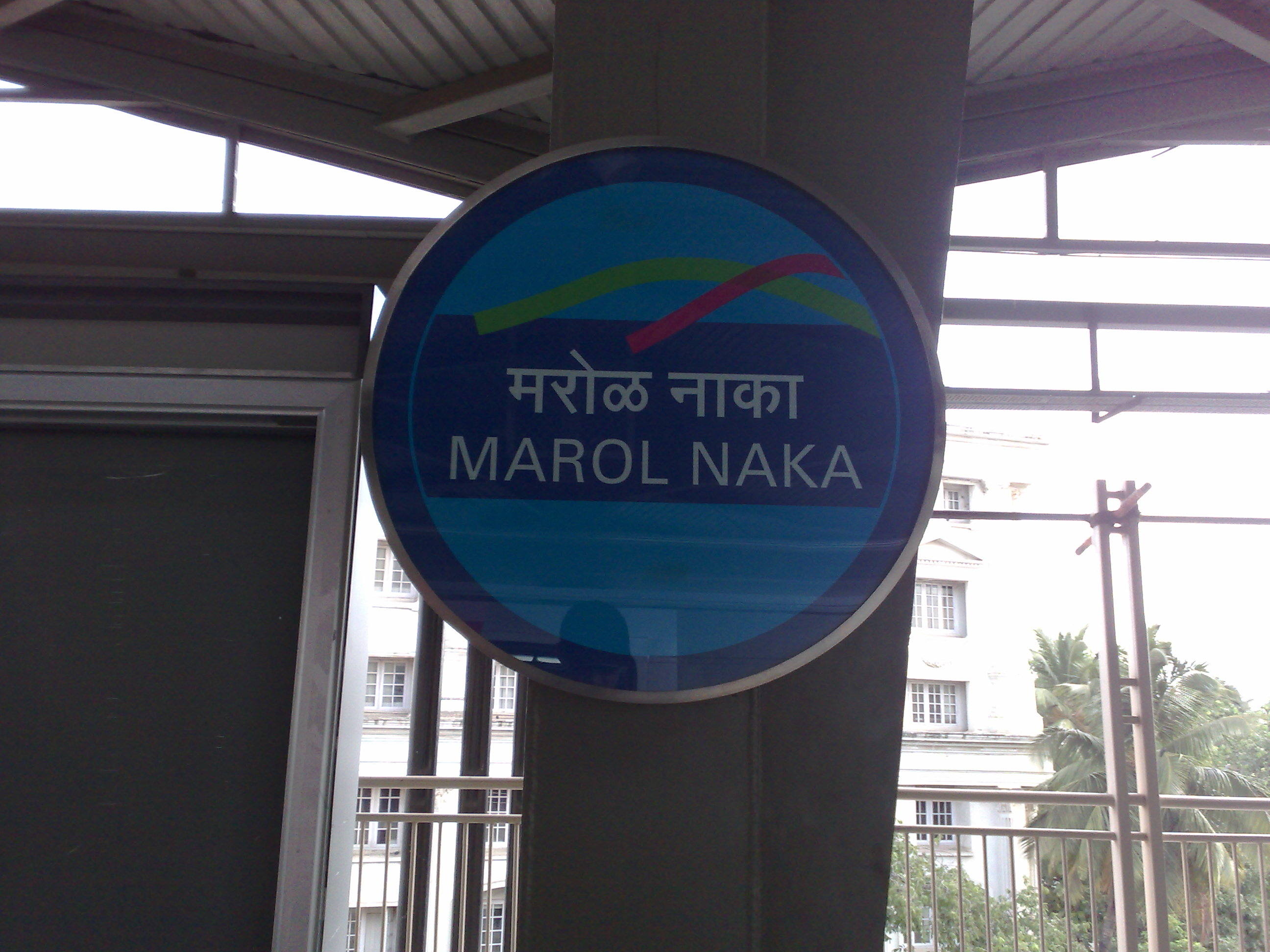
Marol Naka metro station

There is excellent bus connectivity to all parts of the city of Mumbai.

=== Metro ===
Marol is currently served by the Marol Naka station on Line 1 and Line 3 of the Mumbai Metro.
