= JB Nagar =

- Neighbourhood
- Country: India
- State: Maharashtra
- District: Mumbai Suburban
- City: Mumbai

Government
  - Type: Municipal Corporation
  - Body: Brihanmumbai Municipal Corporation (MCGM)

Languages
  - Official: Marathi
- Time zone: UTC+5:30 (IST)
- Area code: 022
- Civic agency: BMC

JB Nagar, expanded to Jamunalal Bajaj Nagar, is a neighbourhood in Andheri (East), Mumbai. Its proximity to Chhatrapati Shivaji Maharaj International Airport makes it a prime business district. Located off the Andheri-Ghatkopar link road near Chakala, it has good east-west connectivity. It is named after industrialist and freedom fighter Jamnalal Bajaj.

There are five high schools in JB Nagar — Divine Child Senior Secondary CBSE School, Divine Child High School, Bombay Cambridge International School, Kalgidhar School & Rajasthan Seva Sangh School.

There are sublocalities like Ajitnagar, CharatSingh Colony, Rajsthan Colony and Om Nagar. J.B. Nagar also has supermarkets like Lucky Stores and Bon Bon Supermarket. JB Nagar has a community page on Instagram by the username 'jb.nagar'.

The first ever Indian Woman to win 5 Crore in Kaun Banega Crorepati was from JB Nagar's Sukdayak society. There are a number of shipping companies in this area. JB Nagar, Andheri East is home to thousands of young working professionals and job seekers from all around India and welcomes everyone with open heart.

JB Nagar is served by the Chakala (J. B. Nagar) metro station on line 1 of the Mumbai Metro. There is a Lakshmi Narayan Temple, garden and community hall here. Film lyricist Pandit Indra Chandra, associated with Gemini Studio and Ranjit Studio stayed in JB Nagar. Also the film actress Madhuri Dixit stayed in JB Nagar till 1992.
