= MIDC – Andheri metro station =

Mumbai Metro's Aqua Line metro station

MIDC – Andheri

General information
- Location: Shree Krishna Nagar, Pandit Dindayal Upadhyay Nagar, Andheri East, Mumbai, Maharashtra 400069
- Coordinates: 19°07′02″N 72°52′25″E
- Owner: Mumbai Metro Rail Corporation Ltd.
- Line: Line 3
- Platforms: 1 island platform

Construction
- Structure type: Underground
- Accessible: Yes

Other information
- Status: Staffed, operational
- Station code: MIDC

History
- Opened: 5 October 2024; 2 years ago

Services
Preceding station	Mumbai Metro	Following station
Marol Naka towards Cuffe Parade	Line 3	SEEPZ towards Aarey JVLR
Track layout
Location

MIDC – Andheri is an underground metro station on the north–south corridor of Aqua Line 3 of the Mumbai Metro in Mumbai, India. This metro station was inaugurated on 5 October 2024, by Prime Minister Narendra Modi, followed by the commencement of the metro service from 7 October 2024.

== Station layout ==
G	Ground level	Exit/entrance
C	Concourse	Customer service, shops, vending machine, ATMs
P Platforms	Platform 2	Towards Aarey JVLR (SEEPZ) →
P Platforms	Island platform, doors will open on the right
P Platforms	Platform 1	← Towards Cuffe Parade (Marol Naka)

=== Entrances and exits ===
- A1/B2 - Road No. 16, SEEPZ
- A2 - Marol Gaon
- B1 - E.S.I.C., Akurti Center

== See also ==
- Mumbai
- Transport in Mumbai
- List of Mumbai Metro stations
- List of rapid transit systems in India
- List of metro systems
