= Marol Naka metro station =

Mumbai Metro's Blue Line 1 metro station

Marol Naka
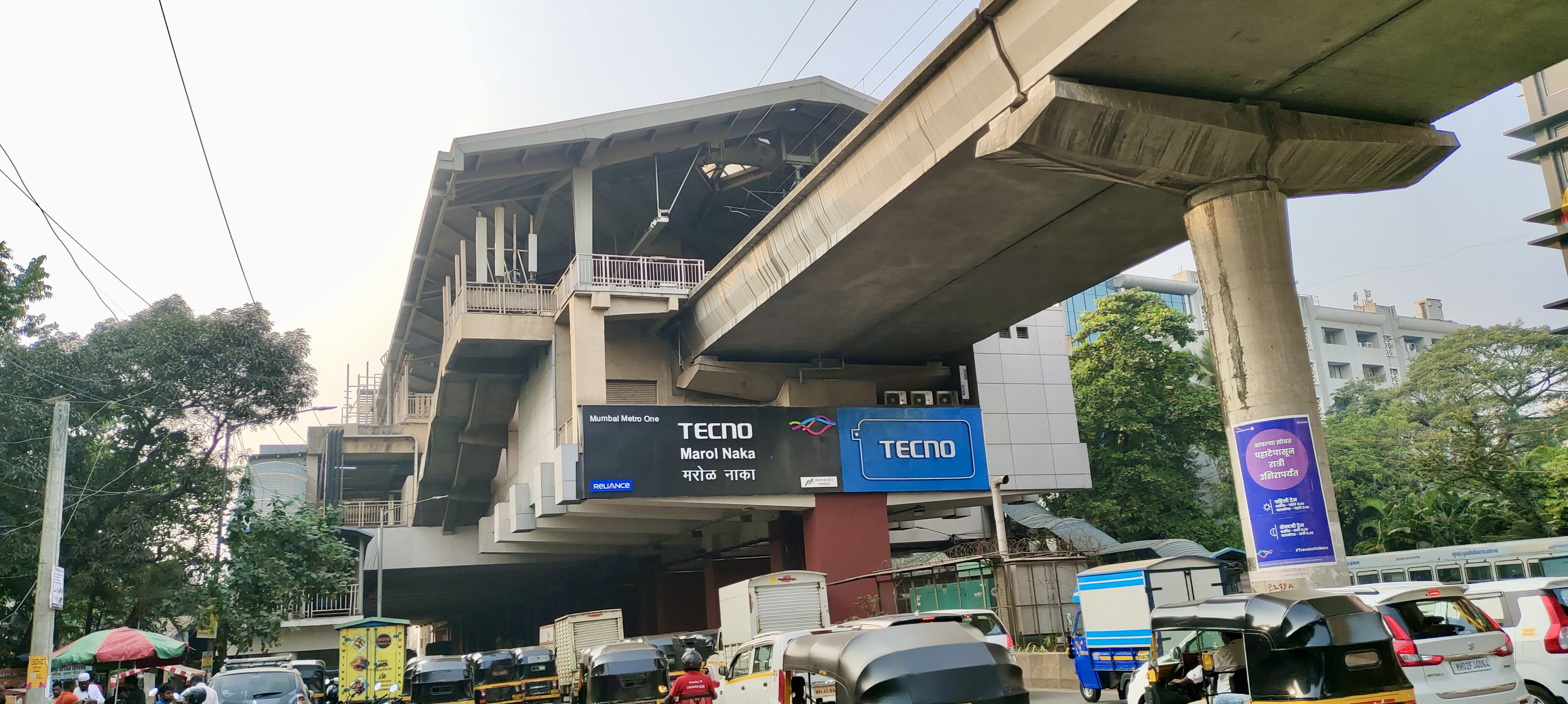
- Elevated Line 1 station in January 2023

General information
- Location: Marol Naka, Andheri (E), Mumbai, Maharashtra; India
- Coordinates: 19°06′30″N 72°52′46″E
- Owner: Mumbai Metropolitan Region Development Authority; Mumbai Metro Rail Corporation

History
- Opened: 8 June 2014; 12 years ago
Location

Marol Naka is an interchange metro station serving the Marol neighbourhood of Andheri in Mumbai, India. Elevated station serves for the East-West Corridor of the Blue Line 1 of Mumbai Metro. It was opened to the public on 8 June 2014. The Underground station serves for the North-South Corridor of the Aqua Line 3 of Mumbai Metro. It was opened to public on 7 October 2024.

Upon the metro line being commissioned for passengers, the BEST launched a special bus service Metro Pheri 1 which brings commuters from a distance to the closest of the 3 metro stations it serves. It runs from SEEPZ and via the B crossroad arrives at Chakala (J. B. Nagar) metro station then runs parallel to the metro line alongside Andheri Kurla Road touching Airport Road metro station and Marol Naka metro station then via Marol Maroshi Road back to SEEPZ.

== History ==
Marol Naka Metro Station is part of Mumbai Metro Blue Line 1, which was constructed under Phase 1 of the Mumbai Metro project. The station’s development began in 2008 as part of a public-private partnership between the Mumbai Metropolitan Region Development Authority (MMRDA) and Reliance Infrastructure, aimed at easing traffic congestion between Versova and Ghatkopar. Delays in land acquisition, utility relocation, and regulatory clearances postponed the station’s completion until 2014.

The station was inaugurated on 8 June 2014, by then-Prime Minister Narendra Modi alongside the full Blue Line 1 corridor. Located near the Marol Fire Brigade and Andheri-Kurla Road, it became a vital hub for commuters in Andheri East, connecting industrial and commercial areas like Saki Naka and the Marol Industrial Estate.

In 2022, the MMRDA proposed integrating the station with the planned Yellow Line 2B (DN Nagar–Mandale) to enhance connectivity with suburban areas.

== Station layout ==
The station consists of two distinct levels of rail service integrated into a single interchange complex. The Blue Line 1 utilizes an elevated structure with two side platforms located on the third floor, overlooking the Andheri-Kurla Road. Beneath this, the elevated concourse level handles ticketing and security.

The Aqua Line 3 station is located underground, featuring an island platform. The two lines aren't connected via lifts or escalators, restricting seamless transfer between the corridors requiring exiting the system.

The station exits are strategically located at the busy junction of Marol Maroshi Road and Andheri-Kurla Road. The immediate vicinity is dominated by the Marol Fire Brigade, a key landmark often used to identify the station's location locally. The street level serves as a multimodal transport hub, providing direct access to BEST bus stops and auto-rickshaw stands that service the nearby SEEPZ industrial area and MIDC.

=== Blue Line ===
Marol Naka
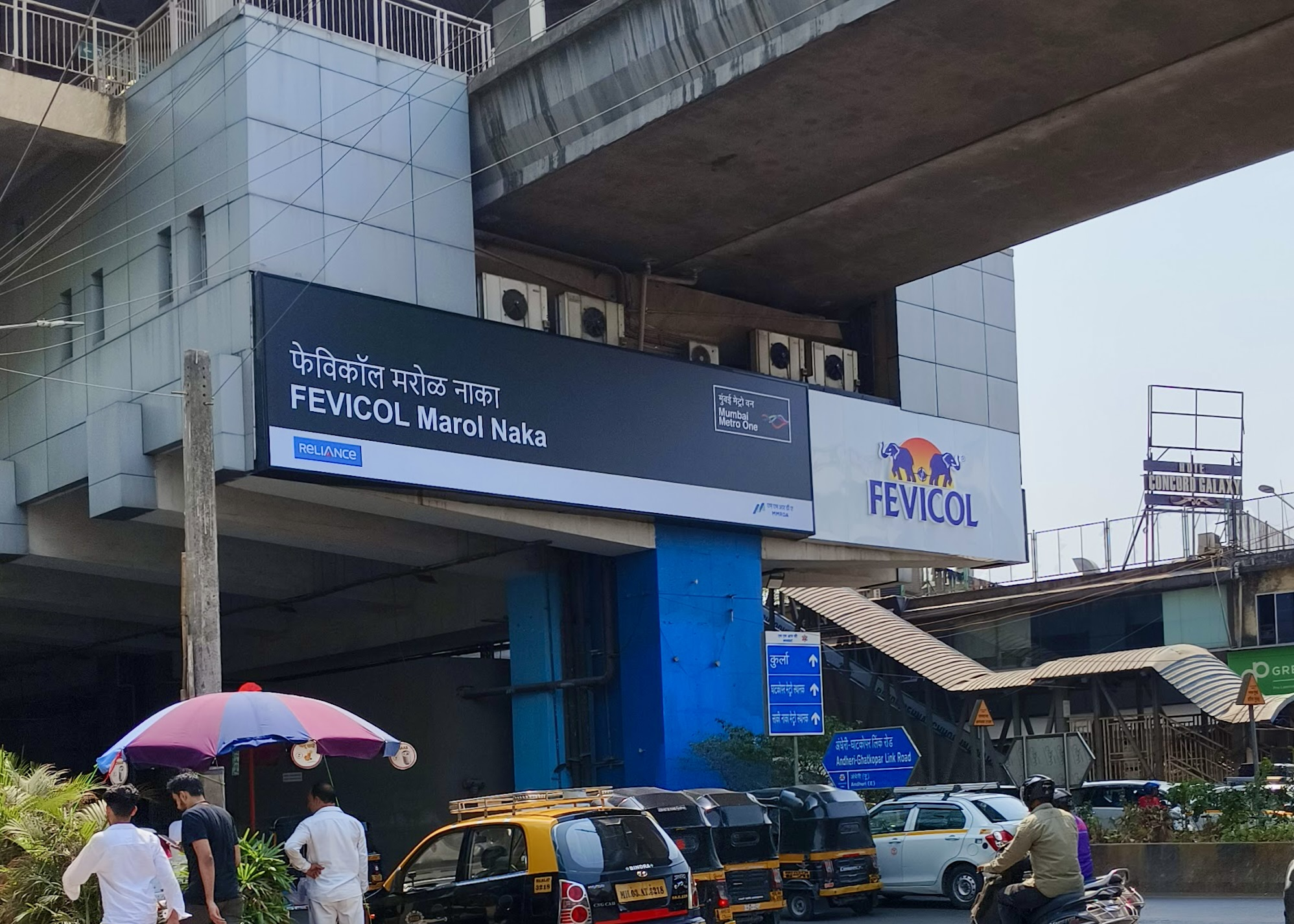
- Marol Naka metro station in March 2025

General information
- Location: Andheri-Kurla Road, Marol, Andheri (East), Mumbai, Maharashtra 400059
- Operator: Mumbai Metro One Pvt Ltd
- Line: Line 1
- Platforms: 2 side platforms

Construction
- Structure type: Elevated
- Parking: No
- Accessible: Yes

Other information
- Station code: MNK

History
- Opened: 8 June 2014; 12 years ago

Services
Preceding station	Mumbai Metro One	Following station
Airport Road towards Versova	Line 1	Saki Naka towards Ghatkopar
Location

2nd Floor	Side platform
2nd Floor	Platform 1	towards Ghatkopar (Saki Naka) →
2nd Floor	Platform 2	← towards Versova (Airport Road)
2nd Floor	Side platform
1st Floor	Mezzanine	Fare control, station agent, Metro Card vending machines, crossover
Ground	Street level	Exit/Entrance

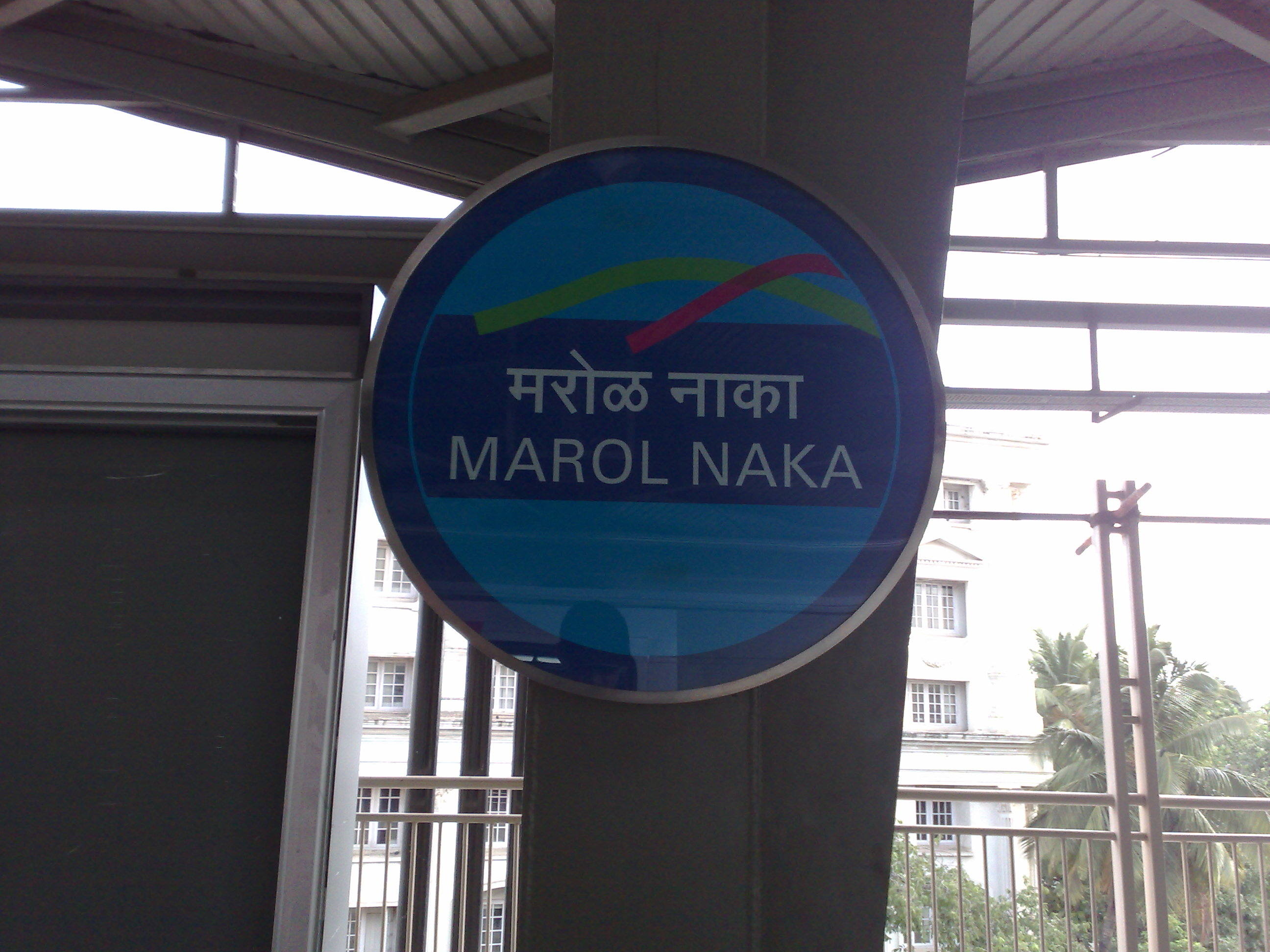
Marol Naka metro station – Platform board

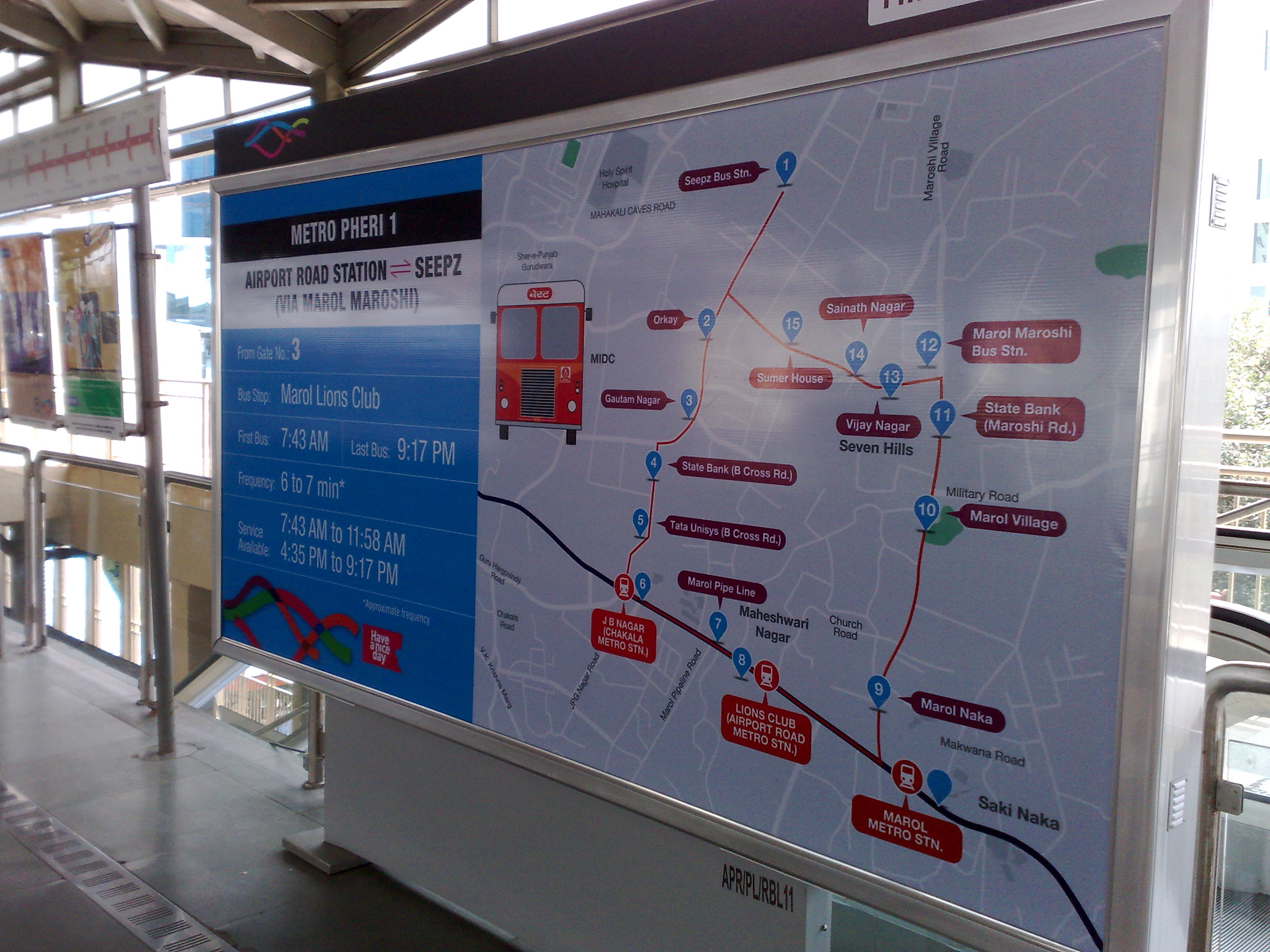
Metro Pheri 1 route map

==== Entrances and exits ====
- 1A - Towards Fire Brigade, Seven Hills Hospital
- 1 - Near We Work, Pearl Academy
- 2 - Near SM Centre
- 3 - Towards Mittal Industrial Estate, Litolier Chamber
- 4 - Medicare Hospital
- 5 - Towards Mumbai International Airport

==== Facilities ====
List of available ATM at Marol Naka metro station are: Kotak Mahindra Bank List of food outlets available : Jumbo King

=== Aqua Line ===
Marol Naka
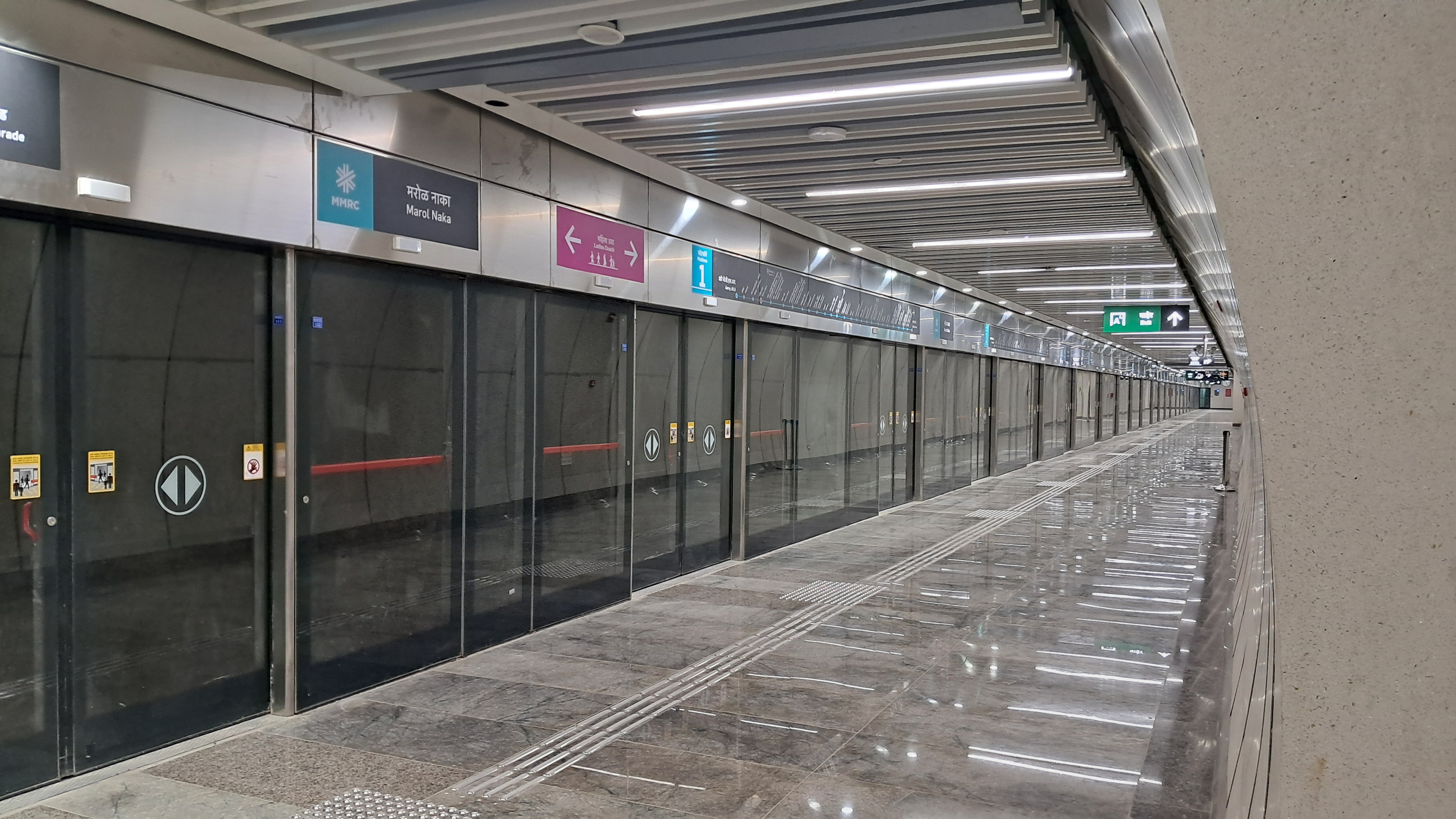
- Platform 1 of Aqua Line 3 Marol Naka station

General information
- Location: Andheri-Kurla Road, Marol, Andheri (East), Mumbai, Maharashtra 400059; India
- Owner: Mumbai Metro Rail Corporation Ltd.
- Line: Line 3
- Platforms: 1 island Platform

Construction
- Structure type: Underground
- Accessible: Yes

Other information
- Station code: MNK

History
- Opened: 5 October 2024; 23 months ago

Services
Preceding station	Mumbai Metro	Following station
CSMI Airport - T2 towards Cuffe Parade	Line 3	MIDC – Andheri towards Aarey JVLR
Track layout
Location

On the second basement (L2) level, a single underground island platform serves two tracks.

G	Ground level	Exit/Entrance
L1	Concourse	Customer Service, Shops, Vending machine, ATMs
L2	Platform 2	Towards Aarey JVLR (MIDC – Andheri) →
L2	Island platform
L2	Entrance/exit vestibule
L2	Island platform
L2	Platform 1	← Towards Cuffe Parade (CSMI Airport - T2)

==== Entrances and exits ====
- A1 - Metro Blue Line, Marol Station, Andheri-Kurla Road
- A2 - Andheri-Kurla Road, International Airport
- B1 - Metro Blue Line, Marol Station, Pearl Academy
- B2 - Marol Fire Brigade, Marol-Marushil Road

== See also ==
- Public transport in Mumbai
- List of Mumbai Metro stations
- List of rapid transit systems in India
- List of Metro Systems
