= Saki Naka =

- Neighbourhood
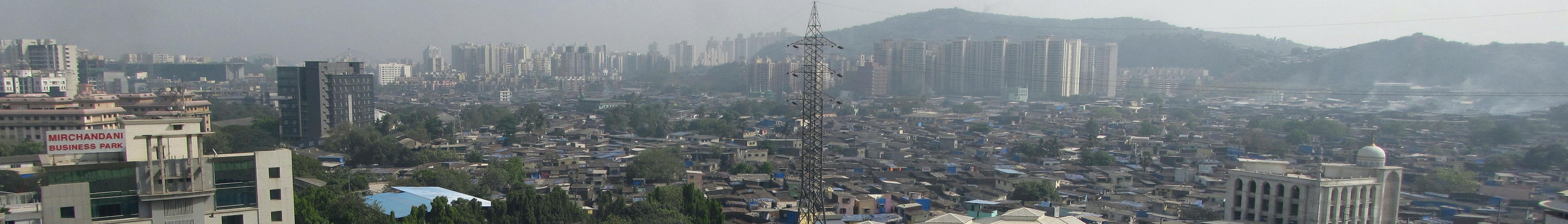

- Location within Mumbai
- Coordinates: 19°5′57″N 72°53′16″E
- Country: India
- State: Maharashtra
- District: Mumbai Suburban
- City: Mumbai

Government
  - Type: Municipal Corporation
  - Body: Brihanmumbai Municipal Corporation (MCGM)

Languages
  - Official: Marathi
- Time zone: UTC+5:30 (IST)
- PIN: 400072
- Area code: 022
- Civic agency: BMC

Saki Naka is a neighbourhood in Andheri East, Mumbai.

== Transport ==
The city's first elevated metro line, Mumbai Metro's line one passes through this neighbourhood and has a station to the east of Sakinaka junction.

== See also ==
- Saki Naka metro station
