= Chakala (J. B. Nagar) metro station =

Mumbai Metro's Blue Line 1 metro station

Chakala (J.B. Nagar) चकाला (जे.बी. नगर)
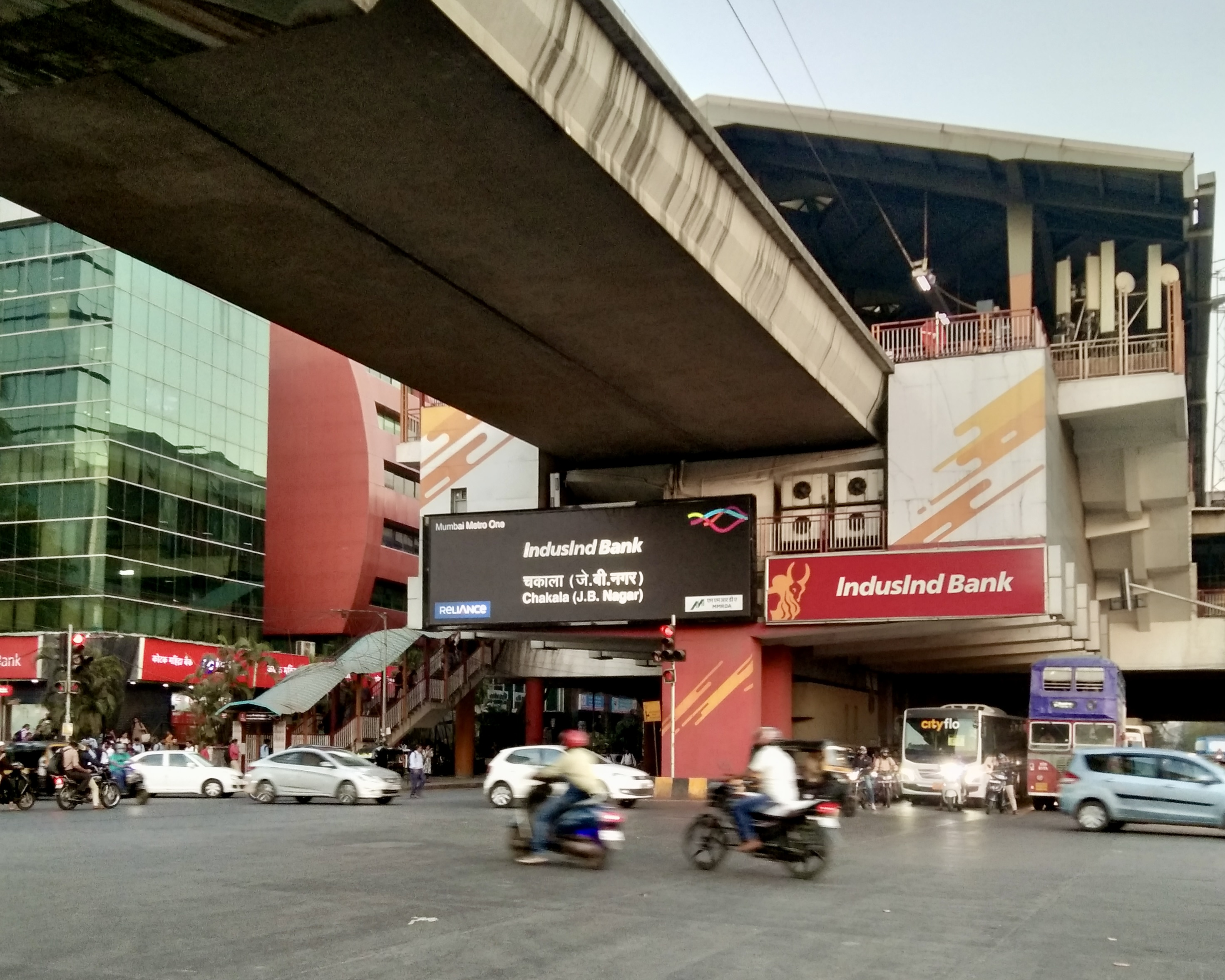

General information
- Location: Andheri - Kurla Rd, J B Nagar, Andheri East, Mumbai, Maharashtra 400059
- Coordinates: 19°06′43″N 72°52′04″E
- Operator: Mumbai Metro One Pvt Ltd
- Line: Line 1
- Platforms: 2 side platforms

Construction
- Structure type: Elevated
- Accessible: Yes

Other information
- Station code: CHK

History
- Opened: 8 June 2014; 12 years ago

Services
Preceding station	Mumbai Metro One	Following station
Western Express Highway towards Versova	Line 1	Airport Road towards Ghatkopar
Location

Chakala (J.B. Nagar) (Officially known as IndusInd Bank Chakala (J.B. Nagar)) is an elevated metro station on the East-West Corridor of the Blue Line 1 of Mumbai Metro, serving the JB Nagar neighbourhood of Andheri in Mumbai. It was opened to the public on 8 June 2014.

Chakala station is located 1.5–2 km away from the Chakala, neighbourhood of Andheri. The station is close to the JB Nagar bus stop. Local residents opposed the current name and held protest marches demanding that the station be named JB Nagar station.

== History ==
Legislator Krishna Hegde stated that it would be difficult to change the name at this point, and suggested the name be changed to Chakala (J B Nagar) in the interim. UPS Madan stated, "The Chakala issue is being processed. It requires an amendment in the notification by the Union ministry of urban development. No corrections are required in case of other stations." Mumbai Metro One Private Ltd (MMOPL) stated on 8 March 2014 that to date no official request to change the name had been received.

Upon the metro line being commissioned for passengers, the BEST launched a special bus service Metro Pheri 1 which brings commuters from a distance to the closest of the three metro stations it serves. It runs from SEEPZ and via the B cross road arrives at Chakala (J.B.Nagar) metro station runs parallel to the metro line alongside Andheri Kurla Road touching Airport Road metro station and Marol Naka metro station then via Marol Maroshi Road back to SEEPZ.

== Station layout ==
2nd Floor	Side platform
2nd Floor	Platform 1	towards Ghatkopar (Airport Road) →
2nd Floor	Platform 2	← towards Versova (WEH)
2nd Floor	Side platform
1st Floor	Mezzanine	Fare control, station agent, Metro Card vending machines, crossover
Ground	Street level	Exit/Entrance

== Facilities ==
List of available ATM at Chakala (J.B.Nagar) metro station are

== Gallery ==
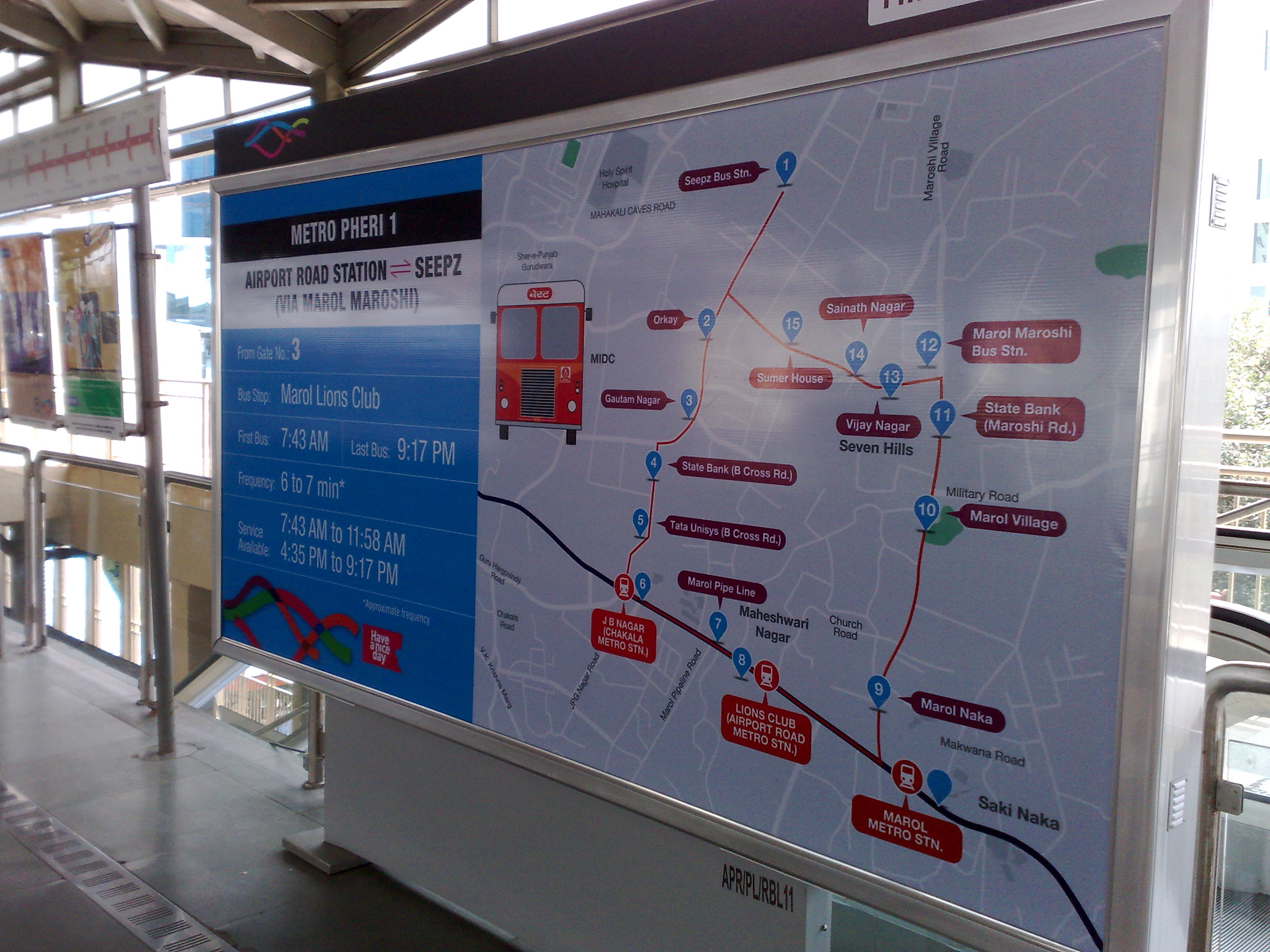
Metro Pheri 1 route map

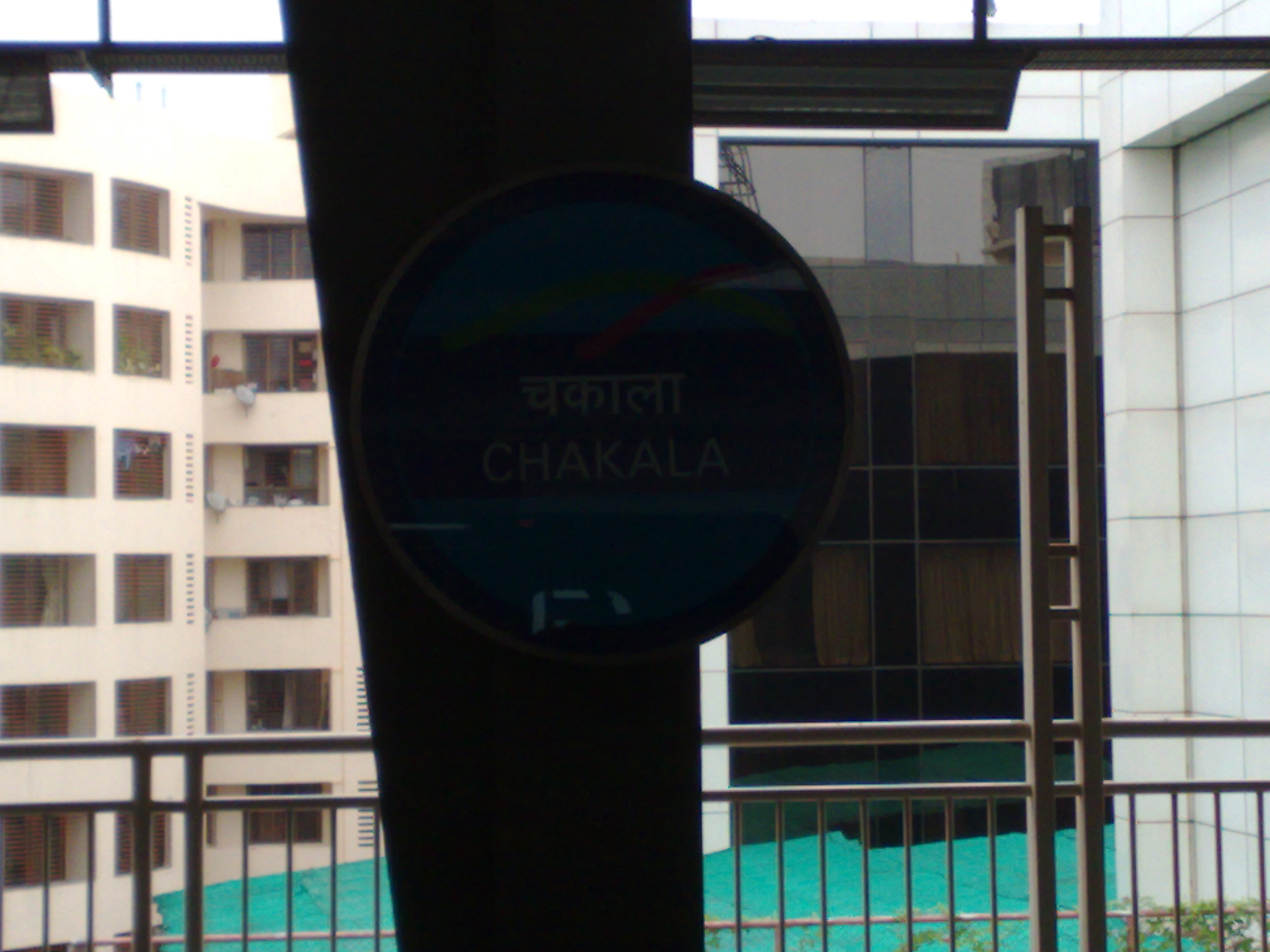
Chakala metro station

== Entrances and exits ==
- 1 - Near Kotak Mahindra Bank, Exit for MIDC
- 2 - Near Hotel Kohinoor Continental
- 3 - Near Trade Star, Sahar Plaza
- 4 - Near Hotel Gopal Krishna, Towards J.B. Nagar
- 5 - Near ICICI Bank
- 6 - Towards Solitaire Park, Gurudwara

== See also ==
- Public transport in Mumbai
- List of Mumbai Metro stations
- List of rapid transit systems in India
- List of Metro Systems
