= Jumbo King =

Indian fast-food restaurant chain

Jumboking Foods Pvt. Ltd.
- Type: Privately held company
- Industry: Fast food
- Founded: Malad, Mumbai, India 23 August 2001; 25 years ago
- Founder: Dheeraj Gupta
- Headquarters: Mumbai, Maharashtra, India
- Number of locations: 145+ (2023)
- Area served: Mumbai, Bangalore, Hyderabad, Pune, Delhi and Lucknow
- Products: Burgers, fries, thickshake, and softies
- Revenue: ₹25 crore (US$2.6 million); 2013-14
- Website: www.jumboking.co.in

Jumboking is an Indian vegetarian burger quick service restaurant chain. Established on 23 August 2001 by Dheeraj Gupta, Founder and MD of Jumboking and Reeta Gupta, the co-founder, the company got inspired by the fast food business model of McDonald's and Burger King. The chain has more than 145 outlets in major Indian cities such as Mumbai, Navi Mumbai, Thane, Delhi, Hyderabad and Pune. The company has delivery tie-ups with Swiggy and Zomato to service out-of-store orders.

== History ==
An earlier franchisee of Burger King, the Guptas, on their visit to London, realised that fast food could also work in India. Vada pav was their first idea, as the food had to be portable. In 2001, the Guptas opened their first restaurant at Malad, with an initial investment of ₹2 lakh (US$2,100), which they borrowed from his family. The outlet was initially named Chaat Factory (Snack Factory), and vada pav was sold at ₹5, despite street vendors selling the same product for ₹2. The name was later changed to Jumbo King. Gupta faced opposition from his family, who thought he was wasting his MBA by selling vada pavs.

Vada pav is a popular vegetarian dish native to the Indian state of Maharashtra, although it has been losing its reputation in past few years. Some places where the food is now cooked and sold are often polluted. The people of Mumbai and Thane consume about 18–20 lakh (1.8–2 million) units of vada pav, with stiff competition mainly from the street vendors in the city.

As of 2010, the chain had 30 outlets in Mumbai, selling an average of 40,000 vada pavs every day, priced between ₹10 and ₹80 a piece. As of August 2017, the chain now has above 300 outlets across various parts of India.

It repositioned itself as an Indian burger brand in 2015. Jumbo King launched a range of burgers, such as corn and spinach, crispy veggie and mac and cheese.

=== Timeline ===
- 2001: First outlet of the chain at Malad in Mumbai was opened on 23 August 2001.
- 2003: Second outlet in Kandivali, Malad.
- 2005: Expanded to five outlets in Mumbai.
- 2006: First outlet in Surat, Gujarat.
- 2007: Received Award for New Concept Franchising and Award as Innovative Franchisee model.
- Two outlets were opened in Ahmedabad on 17 August 2007.
- 2009: Expanded to 38 outlets.
- 2011: First outlet in Bangalore at Koramangala.
- 2014: First outlet in Hyderabad at Narayanguda.
- 2021: Expansion in Delhi and Hyderabad

== Menu ==
A Jumbo King vada pav consists of a batata vada (a spicy deep-fried potato patty) in a pav (bread roll), similar in size and shape to a Quarter Pounder. Jumbo King is considered Mumbai's first branded vada pav, and is the largest selling brand. The pav used by Jumbo King was designed by Salim Malik, who dropped out of college to help run his father's bakery. Thanks to work with Jumbo King, their bakery has become the largest dealer of pavs in Borivali. They offer Lassi, a popular and traditional yogurt-based drink of the Indian subcontinent, as well as Coca-Cola products.

Jumbo King offers several variations of the vada pav, that include unique schezwan sauce, as well as different patties such as corn and peas, corn and spinach, crunchy vegetables, salted fries, thick shakes and sundaes.
