= Holy Family High School (Mumbai) =

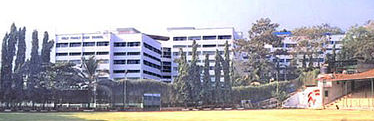

Location
- Mahakali Caves Road, East Andheri, Mumbai; Maharashtra, 400093; India; 19°07′01″N 72°51′43″E

Information
- Type: Private primary and secondary school
- Motto: Loyalty through service
- Religious affiliation: Catholicism
- Denomination: Jesuits
- Established: 1945; 81 years ago
- Principal: Fr. Malcolm Nato, S.J.
- Grades: K-12
- Gender: Boys
- Enrollment: 2,600
- Language: English; Marathi
- Website: www.holyfamilyandheri.org

The Holy Family High School is a private Catholic primary and secondary school for boys located in the suburb of East Andheri in Mumbai, in the state of Maharashtra, India. While the school is primarily English-medium, there is also a smaller Marathi-medium section that runs in parallel from the fifth to the tenth standard. The school now also has a junior college named Holy Family Junior College for 11th and 12th grade HSC students. The school is located near MIDC, Andheri East, Mumbai - 400093, Opposite MIDC building.

== History ==
Old logo

Holy Family High School was founded in 1944 as a parish institution in an old, single-storied structure by Fr. Denzil Keating, S.J. The school's first headmistress was Maud D'Costa.

In 1963, another school building was constructed adjoining Holy Family Church. It was improved and extended with the help of student efforts such as donations, raffles, and school fêtes. A new hall and classrooms were constructed. This building lacked facilities such as filtered drinking water and a cafeteria. It had an inadequate playground and poor sports facilities, requiring the use of the Vinayalaya Jesuit seminary grounds, behind the school and church buildings. The building was extended in the 1970s to have multiple stories, with additional classrooms and a school hall. The school had female students for a few years. Some were admitted for year 11 science and commerce streams. Earlier in the school's history females were accepted at lower levels as well. A mini-stadium was built on the old school ground using funds donated by Jitendra Shah. A few years later, the building became too small to cater to the growing number of parishioners and the building was sold.

A more spacious building was constructed, with its own playground on a nearby plot of land. On 22 October 1985, Fr. Lisbert D'Souza, S.J., (Provincial Superior of the Bombay Jesuits) blessed the foundation stone and on 16 July 1988 Bishop Ferdinand Fonseca blessed the new building. On 7 January 1989, under the tenure of Jesuit Frs. Tony J. D'Souza as vicar and Francis Gonsalves as principal, the new school building was formally inaugurated by Simon Cardinal Pimenta, the archbishop of Bombay.

In 2005, the school added an amphitheatre and in 2009 a semi-olympic size swimming pool, both at the initiative of the school PTA. Craft and painting courses are offered. Class picnics are held once a year.

A Parent-Teacher Association (PTA) was established in 1964.

=== 50th anniversary ===
In 1995, the school celebrated its 50th anniversary with a grand celebration including a fireworks display. In the large crowd attending were several of the school's former principals. A time capsule containing fifty years of school information was buried at the foot of the Holy Family statue to be reopened in the year 2045.

=== 60th anniversary ===
In 2005 the school celebrated its 60th anniversary. Under the initiative of the principal, Fr. Francis Swamy, S.J., and the school's PTA, a five-night fête was held on the school grounds. Celebrities were present for the occasion which was broadcast live on cable TV.

== Principals ==
The following individuals have served as principal of the school:

Ordinal	Officeholder	Term start	Term end	Time in office
1	Fr. Denzil Keating, S.J.	1944	1949	4–5 years
2	Fr. Julius Gomes, S.J.	1949	1951	1–2 years
3	Fr. Fred Britto, S.J.	1951	1952	0–1 years
4	Fr. H Jiminez, S.J.	1952	1960	7–8 years
5	Fr. Basil Fernandes, S.J.	1960	1966	5–6 years
6	Fr. Joe D'Abreo, S.J.	1966	1968	1–2 years
7	Fr. Henry D'Cruz, S.J.	1968	1970	1–2 years
8	Fr. Percy D'Souza, S.J.	1970	1971	0–1 years
9	Fr. Valero Aleu, S.J.	1971	1974	2–3 years
(6)	Fr. Joe D'Abreo, S.J.	1974	1977	2–3 years
10	Fr. Joaquim Mascarenhas, S.J.	1977	1980	2–3 years
11	Fr. Sebastian Fernandes, S.J.	1980	1982	1–2 years
(10)	Fr. Joaquim Mascarenhas, S.J.	1982	1986	3–4 years
12	Fr. Edmund Carrasco, S.J.	1986	1988	1–2 years
13	Fr. Francis Gonsalves, S.J.	1988	1990	1–2 years
14	Fr. Tony Fonseca, S.J.	1990	1995	4–5 years
(10)	Fr. Joaquim Mascarenhas, S.J.	1995	1998	2–3 years
15	Dr. Fr. Francis Swamy, S.J.	1998	2013	14–15 years
16	Dr. Br. Thomas Vaz, S.J.	2013	incumbent	9 years
17	Fr. Andrew Rodrigues	2022	Present	

== See also ==
- List of Jesuit schools
- List of schools in Mumbai
- Violence against Christians in India
