= List of neighbourhoods in Mumbai =

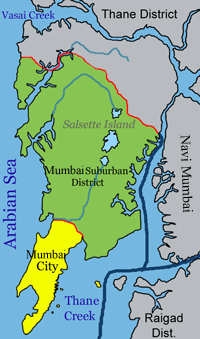
Mumbai consists of two revenue districts.

The city of Mumbai consists of two distinct regions: Mumbai City district and Mumbai Suburban district, forming two separate revenue districts under Maharashtra. The city district region is also commonly called Island City or South Mumbai. Mumbai Suburban district lies north Mumbai City district and includes all Mumbai suburbs. Western portion forms Western Suburbs, while eastern side forms Eastern Suburbs. Suburbs Chembur, Govandi, Mankhurd, and Trombay lie of the south-east Eastern Suburbs. These suburbs generally not considered part Eastern Suburbs and sometimes referred as "Harbour Suburbs".

The total area of Mumbai is 603.4 km^{2} (233 sq mi). Of this, the island city spans 67.79 km^{2} (26 sq mi), while the suburban district spans 370 km^{2} (143 sq mi), together accounting for 437.71 km^{2} (169 sq mi) under the administration of Brihanmumbai Municipal Corporation (BMC). The remaining area belongs to Defence, Mumbai Port Trust, Atomic Energy Commission and Borivali National Park, which are out of the jurisdiction of the BMC. Mumbai lies at the mouth of the Ulhas River on the western coast of India, in the coastal region known as the Konkan. It sits on Salsette Island, partially shared with the Thane district. Mumbai is bounded by the Arabian Sea to the west. Sanjay Gandhi National Park is located partly in the Mumbai suburban district, and partly in the Thane district, and it extends over an area of 103.09 km^{2} (39.80 sq mi).

== Western suburbs ==
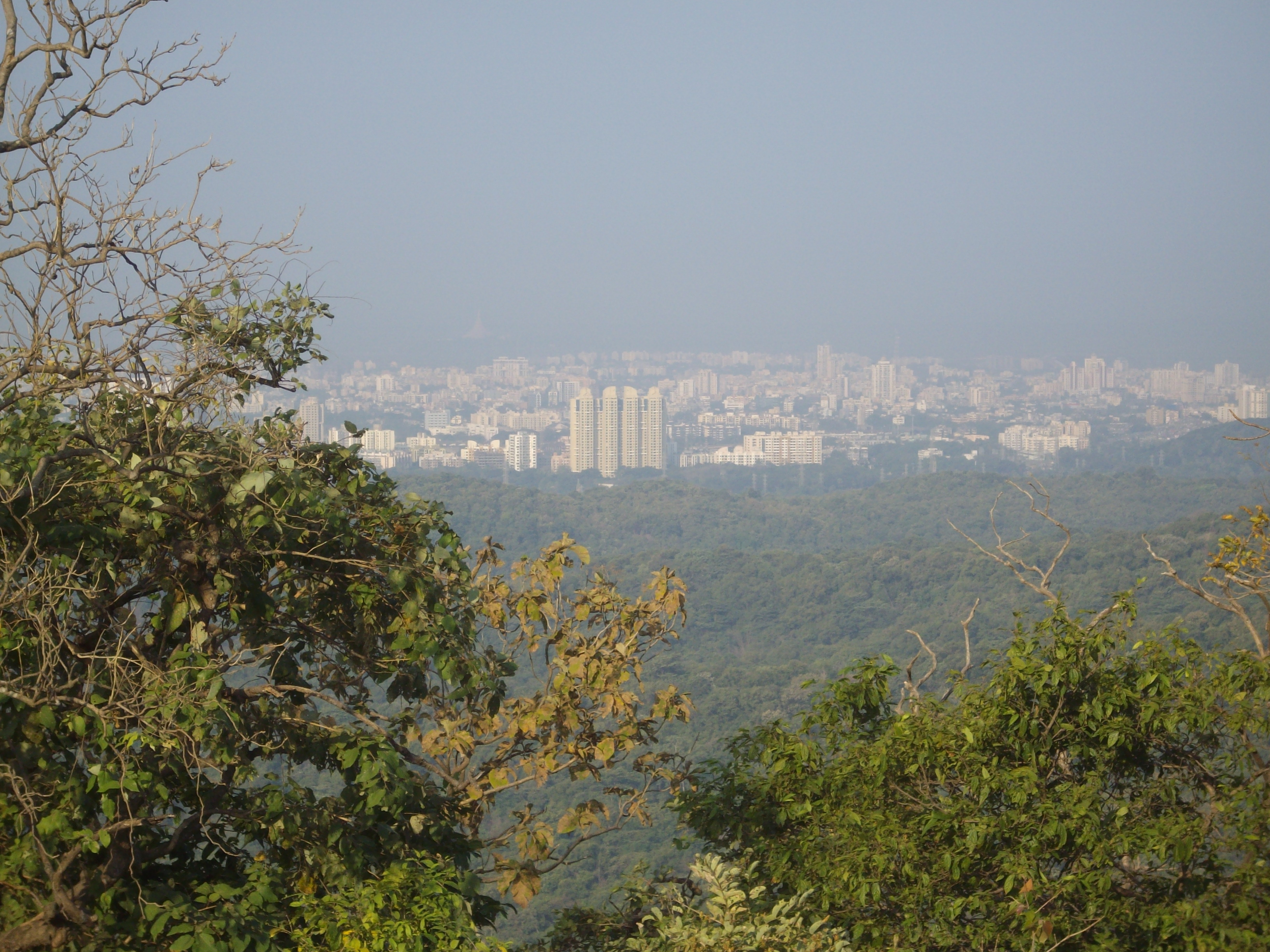
Borivali

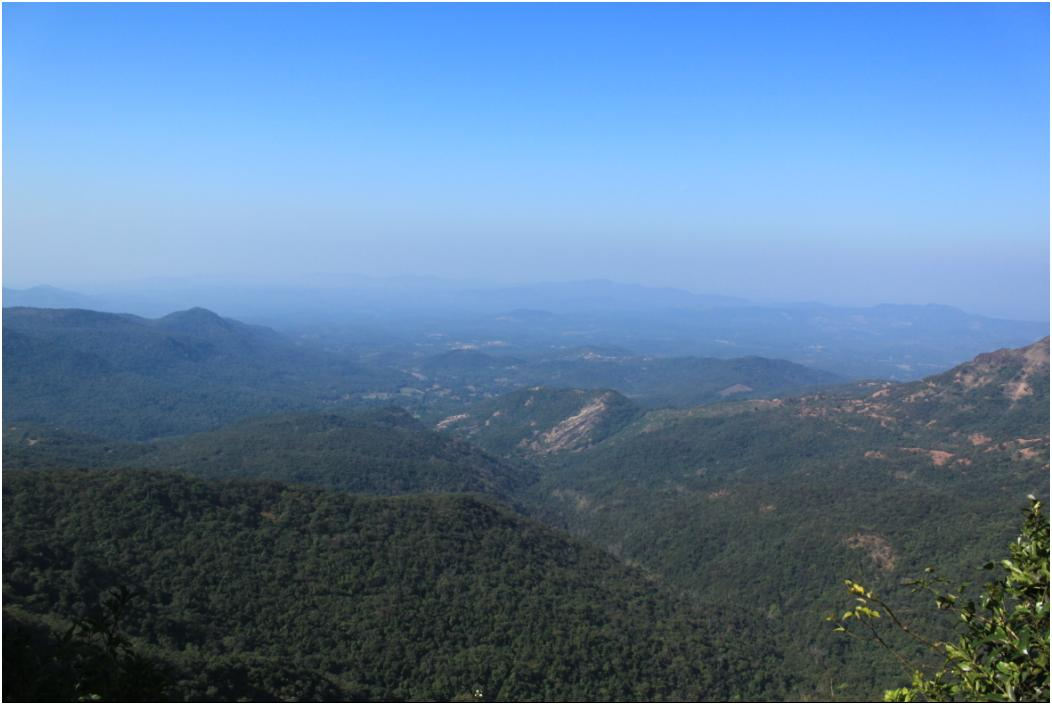
Amboli

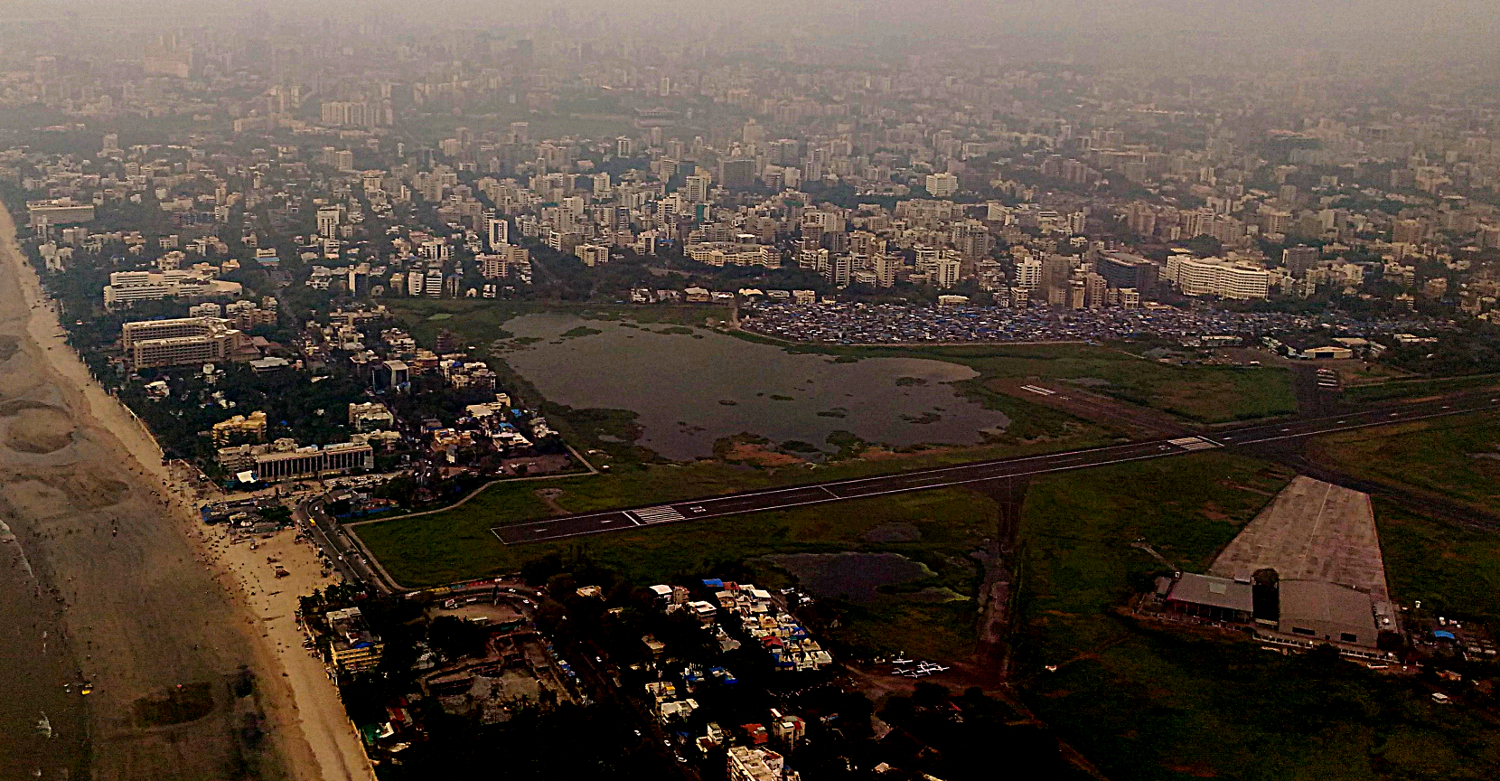
Juhu

=== Andheri ===
- Aram Nagar
- Amboli
- Chakala
- D.N. Nagar
- Four Bungalows
- JB Nagar
- Kajuwadi
- Lokhandwala Complex
- Marol
- Mogra Village
- Model Town
- Poonam Nagar
- Saki Naka
- Seven Bungalows
- Versova
- SEEPZ
- Sahar

=== Bandra ===
- Bandra Kurla Complex
- Bandstand Promenade
- Gandhi Nagar
- M I G Colony
- Kherwadi
- Bharat Nagar
- Land's End
- Pali Hill
- Old Town
- Bandra reclamation
- Chapel Avenue
- KC Marg
- Carter Road
- Kala Nagar
- Naupada
- Nirmal Nagar
- WEH Western Express Highway
- Valmiki Nagar
- Sadguru Colony
- Bharam Nagar
- Subhash Nagar
- Sanjay Nagar
- Sant Dnyaneshwar Nagar
- Bairam Naupada
- Patkar Blocks
- Vaidya Nagar
- Santosh Nagar
- Saint Martin Road
- Saint Andrew Road
- Bandra Fort
- Saint Paul Road
- Guru Nanak Road
- Mount Mary Road
- Saint Josephs Road
- Rizvi Complex
- Ranwar
- D'Monte Park Road
- Perry Cross Road
- Tata Blocks
- Indiraji Nagar
- Somnath lane
- Bandra Terminus
- 28th Road
- 1st Road
- 9th Road
- Saint Cyril Road
- SG Joshi Marg
- B Block BKC
- National Library Road
- Bandra Worli Sea Link
- Manuel Gonsalves Road
- Pandurang Ashram Marg
- Chimbai Road
- Hill Road
- Pereira Road
- BJ Road
- DR. Ambedkar Road
- St. Sebastian Road
- Mount Carmel Road
- Vastu
- Galaxy Apartment
- Pali Mala Road

=== Borivali ===
- I.C. Colony
- L.I.C. Colony aka Jeevan Bhima Nagar
- Eksar Colony
- Shimpoli
- Gorai
- Kora Kendra
- Vazira Naka
- Babhai
- Chikuwadi
- Yogi Nagar
- Devipada
- Magathane
- Nancy Colony
- Sukurwadi

=== Dahisar ===
- NL Complex
- Mandapeshwar Caves
- Northern heights
- Shakti Nagar
- Anand Nagar
- Ketkipada
- Anand Park
- Krishna Colony
- Rawalpada
- Ashok Van
- Balaji Colony
- Ekta Colony
- Maratha Nagar
- Konkani pada
- CS Complex
- Avdhut Nagar
- Narendra Complex
- Shanti Nagar
- Yadav Nagar
- Gavde Nagar
- Ganpat Patil Marg
- Navagaon
- Mhatre Wadi Tadwe Wadi

=== Goregaon ===
- Best Nagar
- Jawahar Nagar
- Aarey Forest
- Motilal Nagar
- Bangur Nagar
- Gokuldham
- Jayprakash Nagar
- Pandurang Wadi
- NESCO Colony
- Oshiwara

=== Jogeshwari ===
- Amrut Nagar
- Kevni Pada
- Behram Baug
- Malcolm Bau
- Patliputra Nagar
- Vahatuk Nagar
- Vaishali Nagar
- Sainik Nagar
- Patilwadi
- Dnyaneshwar Marg
- Shastri Nagar
- Azad Nagar
- Khan Estate
- Pratiksha Nagar
- BR Nagar
- Momin Nagar
- Prabhat Nagar
- Kadam Nagar
- Ambivali
- Mahatma Jyotiba Phule Nagar
- Patel Estate
- Prathmesh Complex
- Somani Gram
- Gautam Nagar
- Adarsh Nagar
- Balasaheb Thackeray Flyover
- JVLR
- Gupha Tekdi
- Poonam Nagar
- Squatters Colony
- Samarth Nagar
- Shyam Nagar
- Seetawadi
- Janata Colony
- Kranti Nagar
- Rup Nagar
- Majas Wadi
- Morga Pada
- Natwar Nagar
- Samarth Nagar
- Namesingh Chawl
- Oberoi Splendor
- Anand Nagar
- Shankar Wadi
- Pratap Nagar
- Sunder Nagar
- Jijamata Colony

=== Kandivali ===
- Dahanukarwadi
- BunderPakhadi (Koliwada)
- Charkop
- Poisar
- Hindustan Naka
- Mahavir Nagar
- Samta Nagar
- Damu Nagar
- Thakur complex
- Thakur village
- Akurli road
- Janupada
- Hanuman Nagar
- Kranti Nagar
- Laxmi Nagar
- Dattani
- Jivali Pada

=== Khar ===
- Pali Naka
- Khar Danda
- 21st Road
- 18th Road
- 16th Road
- 14th Road
- Ambedkar Road

=== Malad ===
- Dindoshi
- Sunder Nagar
- Pathanwadi
- Rani Sati Marg
- Malvani
- Orlem
- Ambujwadi
- Evershine Nagar
- Liliya Nagar
- Jankalyan Nagar

=== Santacruz ===
- Kalina
- Vakola
- Prabhat colony
- Anand Nagar
- Agripada
- New Agripada
- Chaitanya Nagar
- Davri Nagar
- Shivaji Nagar
- Vakola Pipeline
- Yashwant Nagar
- Khira Nagar
- Juhu Koliwada
- Pothohar Nagar
- Gazdhar Bandh

=== Vile Parle ===
- Irla
- Nehru Nagar

== Eastern suburbs ==
=== Bhandup ===
- Bhattipada Road
- Shivaji Talav
- Hanuman Nagar
- Pratap Nagar
- Maharashtra Nagar
- Jamil Nagar
- Kokan Nagar
- Jamin Nagar
- Utkarsh Nagar
- Samarth Nagar
- Tulshet Pada
- Sonapur
- Sahyadri Nagar
- Sarvoday Nagar

=== Ghatkopar ===
- Amrut Nagar
- Asalfa
- Garodia Nagar
- Jagdusha Nagar
- Pant Nagar
- Barve Nagar

=== Kurla ===
- Nehru Nagar
- Kasaiwada
- Quresh Nagar
- Tashilanagar
- Umerwadi
- Ali dada estate
- Takiya wad
- Machi market
- Kapadia nagar
- Khadi
- Court
- Taximen colony
- Halav pool
- Makad wali chawal
- MIG
- LIG
- Bachan tabela
- Pipe road
- Buddha Colony
- Ambedkar Nagar
- Sambhaji chowk
- Machis factory
- Bharti Nagar
- New mill road
- Mubarak complex
- Vinobha bhave
- Kohinoor City
- Christian Gaon
- Jagruti Nagar
- 9 number
- Rajiv Gandhi Nagar
- Lal Taki
- Charbi Gali
- Kamela
- Taxi Stand
- Diamond
- Galaxy
- Bail Bazar
- Kaju Pada
- Ghafoor Khan Estate
- Kurla Depot
- Patel Wadi
- Teacher's Colony
- Dhobi Ghat
- New Hall Road
- Kamaani
- Jari Mari
- Achanak Nagar
- Imam Ahmed Raza Marg
- Huzoor Tajushsharia Chowk
- Father Peter Pereira Chowk
- “L” Ward

=== Mulund ===
- Bombay Colony
- Paach Rasta
- Sarvoday Nagar
- Veena Nagar
- Cypress
- GMLR
- Xavier Street
- PK Road
- Zaver Road
- Devidayal Road
- Mulund Runwals

=== Powai ===
- Chandivali
- Hiranandani Gardens
- Indian Institute of Technology Bombay campus
- BSNL Colony
- Passpoli
- Mhada Colony 19
- Morarji Nagar
- Nitie
- Chandshah Wali Dargah
- Nitie

=== Vidyavihar ===
- Rajawadi
- Pipeline Road
- Kirol
- Khalai

=== Vikhroli ===
- Kanjur Marg
- Gandhi Nagar
- Surya Nagar
- Kannamwar Nagar
- Tagore Nagar
- Park Site
- Godrej Station Colony
- Godrej Hillside Colony
- Godrej Creek

== Central suburbs ==
=== Chembur ===
- Chembur Causeway
- Union Park (Chembur)|Union Park
- Aloysius Soares Road
- Central Avenue
- St Anthony's Road
- St Gregorious Path
- Golf Club Road
- St Sebastian's Marouli village
- Pestom sagar
- Basant Park
- Diamond Garden
- Chedda Nagar
- Indian Oil Nagar
- St Francis of Assisi Nagar
- Swastik Park
- Maitri Park
- Atur Park
- Sindhi Society
- Punjabwadi
- Chembur Camp
- Ghatla village
- Borla village
- Deonar Farm Road
- Subhash Nagar
- Sion Trombay Road
- Wadavali village
- Maravali
- Julianwadi
- P L Lokhande Marg
- Thakkar Bappa Colony
- Suman Nagar
- Postal Colony
- Shell Colony
- Sahakar Nagar
- Tilak Nagar
- New Tilak Nagar
- Mahul
- Vashinaka
- Mahul Village
- Panjarpol
- Siddharth Colony
- Ramakrishna Chemburkar Marg
- Bhakti Park
- RCF
- Mysore Colony
- Collector Colony
- Anushakti Nagar
- Vishnu Nagar
- HP nagar
- BPCL
- Deonar

=== Mankhurd ===
- Mandala

=== Govandi ===
- Baiganwadi
- Deonar
- Shivaji Nagar
- Gautam Nagar
- Lallubhai Compound

=== Wadala ===
- Sangam Nagar
- BPT Colony
- Sahakar Nagar
- Madhav Nagar
- Kidwai Nagar
- GTB Nagar
- Chunabhatti

=== Trombay ===
- Trombay Koliwada
- Cheetah Camp

== South Mumbai ==
- Agripada
- Chinchpokli
- Chor Bazaar
- Churchgate
- Cuffe Parade
- Dava Bazaar
- Grant Road
- Kemps Corner
- Lower Parel
- Mahalaxmi
- Mahim
- Masjid Bunder
- Marine Drive, Mumbai
- Marine Lines
- Mumbai Central
- Nagpada
- Nariman Point
- Prabhadevi
- Worli

=== Antop Hill ===
- C.G.S. colony

=== Bhuleshwar ===
- Zaveri Baazar
- Bhendi Bazaar

=== Byculla ===
- Dagdi Chawl
- Ghodapdeo

=== Colaba ===
- Navy Nagar

=== Cumbala Hill ===
- Breach Candy

=== Dadar ===
- Hindu colony
- Shivaji Park Residential Zone
- Parsi Colony
- Naigaon

=== Fort ===
- Ballard Estate
- Dhobitalao
- Kala Ghoda

=== Girgaon ===
- Charni Road
- Khotachiwadi

=== Kalbadevi ===
- Abdul Rehman Street
- Agiary Lane
- Anant Wadi
- Arthur Road Junction
- Saleem road
- Balaji Mandir
- Bhuleshwar Road
- Cavel
- Cavel Cross Lane
- Champa Wadi
- Chandanwadi Road
- Chira Bazaar
- Clive Road
- Cotton Exchange
- Dadasaheb Parulekar Marg
- Dadiseth Agiary Lane
- Dhanji Street
- Dhirubhai Parekh Marg
- Dr. Atmaram Merchant Road
- Dr. M.B. Velkar Street
- Dr. Viegas Street
- Fanas Wadi
- Fofal Wadi
- Gaiwadi Lane
- Gaushala
- Gulal Wadi
- Haines Road
- Hollvard Road
- Jagannath Shankarseth (JSS) Road
- Kalbadevi Road
- Kavi Nirav Lane
- Kazi Syed Street
- Khodad Circle
- Kika Street
- Kolbhat Lane
- Lohar Chawl
- M.J. Market
- Malharrao Wadi
- Mangaladevi Marg
- Mirza Street
- Nagdevi Cross Street
- Narayan Dhuru Street
- Old Satta Gully
- Panjrapole Lane
- Pophalwadi
- Premkumar Sharma Road
- Ram Wadi
- Shaikh Memon Street
- Shrikant Palekar Marg
- Sitaram Poddar Marg
- Swadeshi Market
- Tambakata
- Tatya Gharpure Marg
- Thakurdwar Road
- Vithal Wadi
- Vithoba Lane

=== Malabar Hill ===
- Walkeshwar

=== Matunga ===
King Circle

=== Parel ===
- Cotton Green
- Lalbaug

=== Sion ===
- Chunabhatti

=== Tardeo ===
- Carmichael Road
- Gowalia Tank
  - Altamount Road
- Nana Chowk

=== Umarkhadi ===
- Dongri

== Other ==
- Dharavi
- Koliwada
- Koombarwara
