= Lower Oshiwara metro station =

Mumbai Metro's Yellow Line 2A metro station

Lower Oshiwara लोअर ओशिवरा

General information
- Location: Veera Desai Industrial Estate, Jogeshwari West, Mumbai, Maharashtra 400047
- Coordinates: 19°08′27″N 72°49′54″E
- Owner: Mumbai Metropolitan Region Development Authority
- Operator: Maha Mumbai Metro Operation Corporation Ltd.
- Line: Line 2A
- Platforms: 2 side platforms
- Connections: Line 6 (Under-construction)

Construction
- Structure type: Elevated
- Parking: No

Other information
- Station code: 216

History
- Opened: 19 January 2023; 3 years ago

Services
Preceding station	Mumbai Metro	Following station
Andheri (West) Terminus	Line 2A	Oshiwara towards Dahisar (East)
Route map
Yellow Line
Location

Lower Oshiwara is an elevated metro station on the North-South corridor of the Yellow Line 2A of Mumbai Metro in Mumbai, India. This station is located in Jogeshwari West, Mumbai. This station is owned by the Mumbai Metropolitan Region Development Authority (MMRDA), and was inaugurated on 19 January 2023.

== History ==
Trial runs on section 2A from Dahanukarwadi to Dahisar East has started from 31 May 2021. Dahisar East commercial operations began on 3 April 2022 with the First phase of line 2A.

== Station layout ==
2nd Floor	Side platform
2nd Floor	Platform 1	towards Dahisar (East) (Oshiwara) →
2nd Floor	Platform 2	← towards Andheri (West) (terminus)
2nd Floor	Side platform
1st Floor	Mezzanine	Fare control, station agent, Metro QR ticket vending machines, crossover
Ground	Street level	Exit/Entrance

=== Power and signaling system ===
Like all other stations and railways of Mumbai metro, Lower Oshiwara station also uses 25,000 volt AC power system by overhead catenary to operate the trains.
