= Malad West metro station =

Mumbai Metro's Yellow Line 2A metro station

Malad (West) मालाड (पश्चिम)
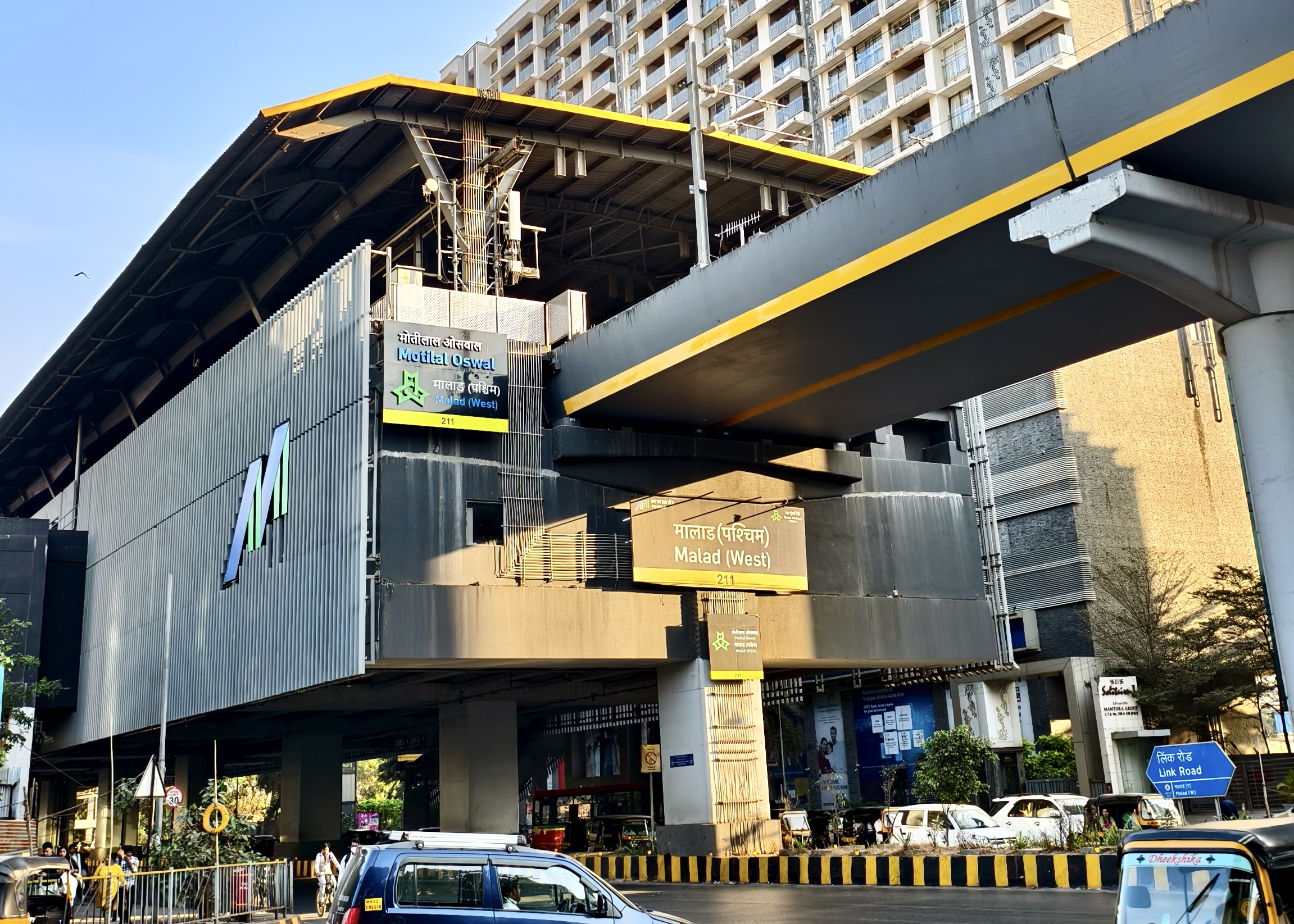
- Malad (West) metro station as seen from street level

General information
- Location: Malad, Ekta Nagar, Malad West, Mumbai, Maharashtra 400064
- Coordinates: 19°11′07″N 72°50′09″E
- Owner: Mumbai Metropolitan Region Development Authority
- Operator: Maha Mumbai Metro Operation Corporation Ltd.
- Line: Line 2A
- Platforms: 2 side platforms
- Tracks: 2

Construction
- Structure type: Elevated
- Parking: yes (paid)

Other information
- Station code: 211

History
- Opened: 19 January 2023; 3 years ago

Services
Preceding station	Mumbai Metro	Following station
Lower Malad towards Andheri (West)	Line 2A	Valnai–Meeth Chowky towards Dahisar (East)
Route map
Yellow Line
Location

Malad West (officially known as Motilal Oswal - Malad West) is an elevated metro station serving the Ekta Nagar neighbourhood of Malad, on the North-South corridor of the Yellow Line 2A of the Mumbai Metro in Mumbai, India. This station is owned by the Mumbai Metropolitan Region Development Authority (MMRDA), and was inaugurated on 19 January 2023.

== History ==
Trial runs on a section of Line 2A, from Dahanukarwadi to Dahisar East, started on 31 May 2021. Dahisar East commercial operations began on 3 April 2022, with the first phase of Line 2A. In May 2024, Motilal Oswal Financial Services Limited (MOFSL), a prominent Indian financial services firm, strengthened its association with the Malad community by securing the naming rights to the Malad West metro station on Mumbai Metro's Yellow Line 2A. The station was officially renamed “Motilal Oswal Malad West,” reflecting the company's commitment to the area where it has maintained a significant presence for over two decades. This initiative underscores MOFSL's dedication to community engagement and its efforts to enhance brand visibility within Mumbai's urban landscape.

== Station layout ==
2nd Floor	Side platform
2nd Floor	Platform 1	towards Dahisar (East) (Valnai-Meeth Chowky) →
2nd Floor	Platform 2	← towards Andheri (West) (Lower Malad)
2nd Floor	Side platform
1st Floor	Mezzanine	Fare control, station agent, Metro QR ticket vending machines, crossover
Ground	Street level	Exit/Entrance

=== Power and signaling system ===
Like all other stations and railways of Mumbai metro, Malad West station also uses 25,000 volt AC power system by overhead catenary to operate the trains.
