= Lower Malad metro station =

Mumbai Metro's Yellow Line 2A metro station

Lower Malad लोअर मालाड

General information
- Location: Prem Nagar, Goregaon West, Mumbai, Maharashtra 400104
- Coordinates: 19°10′23″N 72°50′11″E
- Owner: Mumbai Metropolitan Region Development Authority
- Operator: Maha Mumbai Metro Operation Corporation Ltd.
- Line: Line 2A
- Platforms: 2 side platforms

Construction
- Structure type: Elevated
- Parking: No

Other information
- Station code: 212

History
- Opened: 19 January 2023; 3 years ago

Services
Preceding station	Mumbai Metro	Following station
Bangur Nagar towards Andheri (West)	Line 2A	Malad (West) towards Dahisar (East)
Route map
Yellow Line
Location

Lower Malad is an elevated metro station on the North-South corridor of the Yellow Line 2A of Mumbai Metro in Mumbai, India. This station is located in Goregaon, Mumbai. This station is owned by the Mumbai Metropolitan Region Development Authority (MMRDA), and was inaugurated on 19 January 2023.

== Station layout ==
2nd Floor	Side platform
2nd Floor	Platform 1	towards Dahisar (East) (Malad (West)) →
2nd Floor	Platform 2	← towards Andheri (West) (Bangur Nagar)
2nd Floor	Side platform
1st Floor	Mezzanine	Fare control, station agent, Metro QR ticket vending machines, crossover
Ground	Street level	Exit/Entrance

=== Power and signaling system ===
Like all other stations and railways of the Mumbai metro, Lower Malad station also uses a 25,000 volt AC power system by overhead catenary to operate the trains.
