= Bangur Nagar metro station =

Mumbai Metro Line 2A station

Bangur Nagar बांगुर नगर
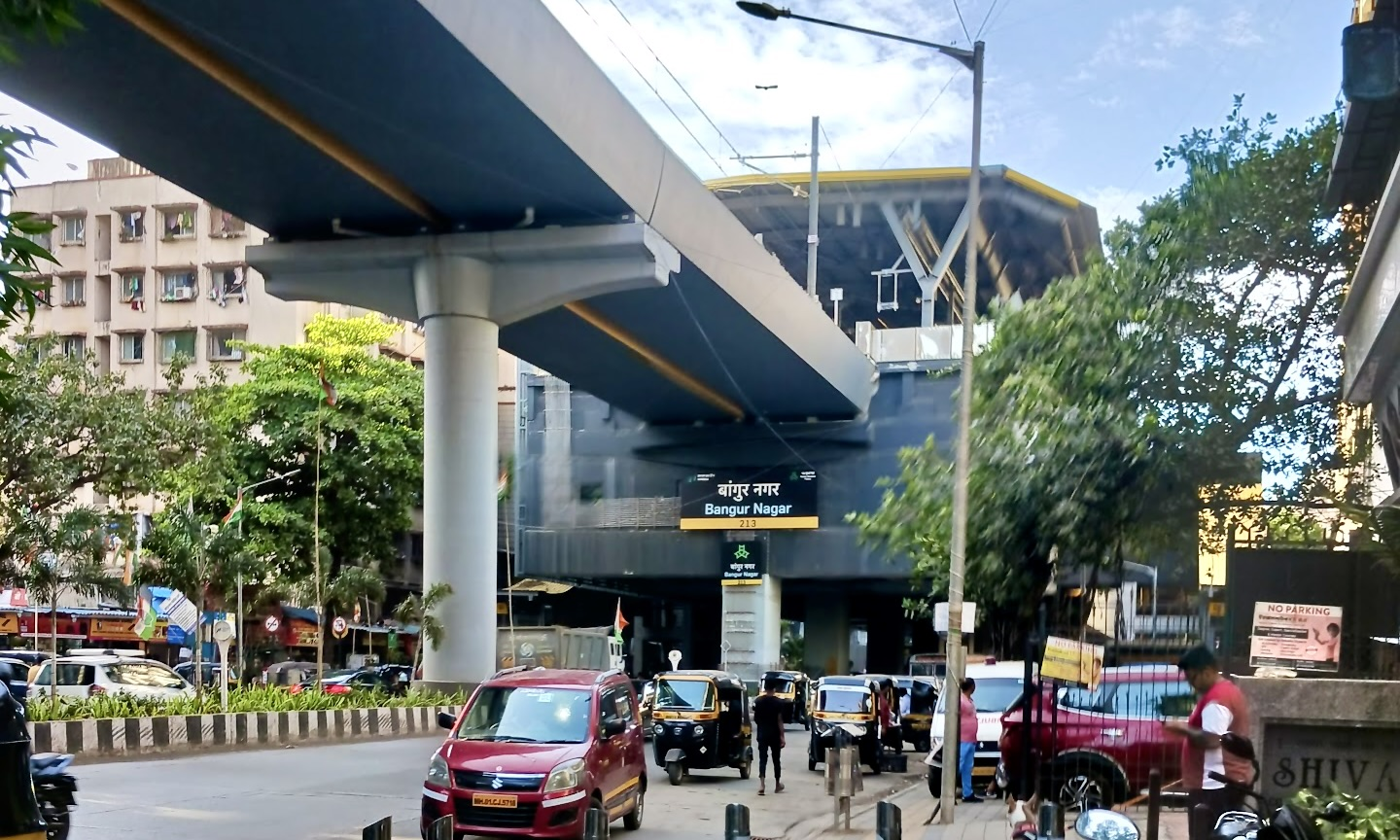
- Bangur Nagar metro station as seen from New Link Rd

General information
- Location: Mitha Nagar, Goregaon West, Mumbai, Maharashtra 400090
- Coordinates: 19°09′45″N 72°50′06″E
- Owner: Mumbai Metropolitan Region Development Authority
- Operator: Maha Mumbai Metro Operation Corporation Ltd.
- Line: Line 2A
- Platforms: 2 side platforms

Construction
- Structure type: Elevated
- Parking: No

Other information
- Station code: 213

History
- Opened: 19 January 2023; 3 years ago

Services
Preceding station	Mumbai Metro	Following station
Goregaon (West) towards Andheri (West)	Line 2A	Lower Malad towards Dahisar (East)
Route map
Yellow Line
Location

Bangur Nagar is the elevated metro station serving the Bangur Nagar neighbourhood of Goregaon on the North-South corridor of the Yellow Line 2A of the Mumbai Metro in Mumbai, India. This station is owned by the Mumbai Metropolitan Region Development Authority (MMRDA) and was inaugurated on 19 January 2023.

== History ==
The station was originally named Pahadi Goregaon metro station during the construction phase. However, after protests by residents, it was renamed to Bangur Nagar. In August 2025, the station was officially renamed as 'Arkade Bangur Nagar' after Arkade Developers purchased the station's naming rights.

== Station layout ==
2nd Floor	Side platform
2nd Floor	Platform 1	towards Dahisar (East) (Lower Malad) →
2nd Floor	Platform 2	← towards Andheri (West) (Goregaon (West))
2nd Floor	Side platform
1st Floor	Mezzanine	Fare control, station agent, Metro QR ticket vending machines, crossover
Ground	Street level	Exit/Entrance

=== Power and signaling system ===
Like all other stations and railways of the Mumbai Metro, the Bangur Nagar station also uses 25,000-volt AC power system by overhead catenary to operate the trains.
