= Goregaon West metro station =

Mumbai Metro's Yellow Line 2A terminal metro station

Goregaon (West) गोरेगाव (पश्चिम)

General information
- Location: New Link Rd, Best Nagar, Goregaon West, Mumbai, Maharashtra 400104
- Coordinates: 19°09′11″N 72°50′08″E
- Owner: Mumbai Metropolitan Region Development Authority
- Operator: Maha Mumbai Metro Operation Corporation Ltd.
- Line: Line 2A
- Platforms: 2 side platforms

Construction
- Structure type: Elevated
- Parking: No

Other information
- Station code: 214

History
- Opened: 19 January 2023; 3 years ago

Services
Preceding station	Mumbai Metro	Following station
Oshiwara towards Andheri (West)	Line 2A	Bangur Nagar towards Dahisar (East)
Route map
Yellow Line
Location

Goregaon West is the elevated metro station serving the Patliputra neighbourhood of Goregaon on the North-South corridor of the Yellow Line 2A of the Mumbai Metro in Mumbai, India. This station is owned by the Mumbai Metropolitan Region Development Authority (MMRDA), and was inaugurated on 19 January 2023.

== Station layout ==
2nd Floor	Side platform
2nd Floor	Platform 1	towards Dahisar (East) (Bangur Nagar) →
2nd Floor	Platform 2	← towards Andheri (West) (Oshiwara)
2nd Floor	Side platform
1st Floor	Mezzanine	Fare control, station agent, Metro QR ticket vending machines, crossover
Ground	Street level	Exit/Entrance

=== Power and signaling system ===
Like all other stations and railways of the Mumbai metro, Andheri West station also uses 25,000 volt AC power system by overhead catenary to operate the trains.
