= Valnai–Meeth Chowky metro station =

Mumbai Metro's Yellow Line 2A metro station

Valnai–Meeth Chowky वळनई–मीठ चौकी
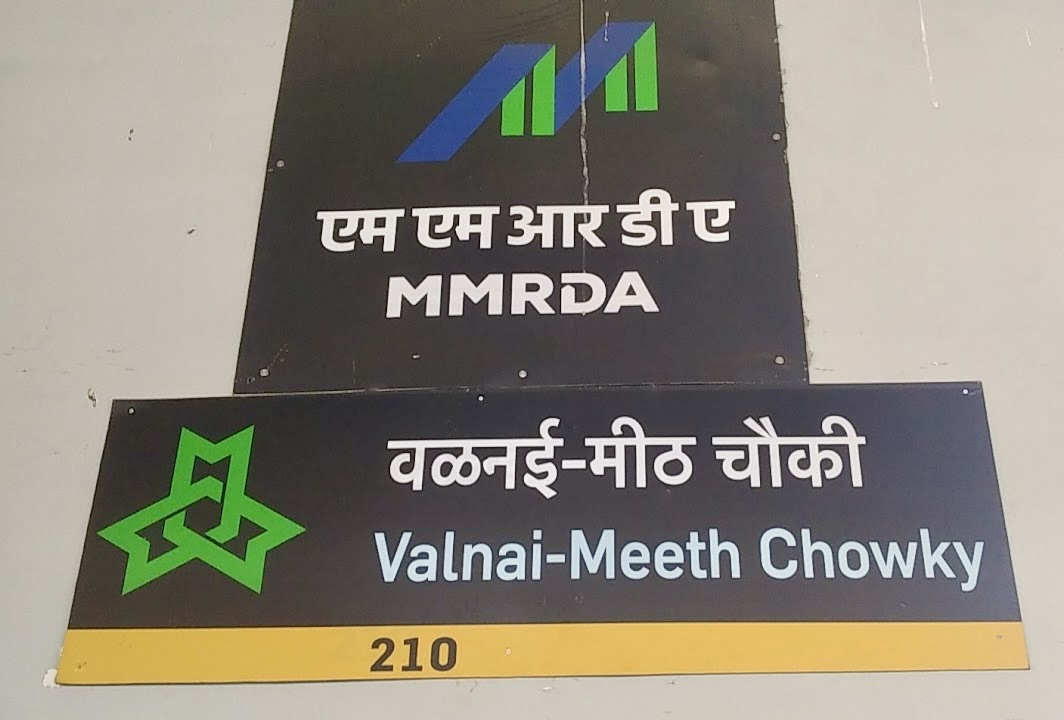

General information
- Location: Malad, Mithchowki, Malad West, Mumbai, Maharashtra 400064
- Coordinates: 19°11′49″N 72°50′02″E
- Owner: Mumbai Metropolitan Region Development Authority
- Operator: Maha Mumbai Metro Operation Corporation Ltd.
- Line: Line 2A
- Platforms: 2 side platforms

Construction
- Structure type: Elevated
- Parking: No

Other information
- Station code: 210

History
- Opened: 19 January 2023; 3 years ago

Services
| Preceding station | Mumbai Metro | Following station |
|---|---|---|
| Malad (West) towards Andheri (West) | Line 2A | Dahanukarwadi towards Dahisar (East) |
Route map
Yellow Line
Location

Valnai – Meeth Chowky (formerly known as Valnai) is an elevated metro station on the north–south corridor of the Yellow Line 2A of Mumbai Metro in Mumbai, India. The station is located in Malad, Mumbai. This station is owned by the Mumbai Metropolitan Region Development Authority (MMRDA), and was inaugurated on 19 January 2023.

== History ==
Valnai metro station was announced to be built in the second package of line 2A. J. Kumar Infraprojects was awarded the construction work contract for both packages of line 2A in June 2016. The cost of package was estimated at ₹700 crore each. J. Kumar Infraprojects bid below the reserve price. As per the agreement, the company started the construction of Valnai metro station along with the elevated viaducts and other stations of the second package.

The station was originally named Valnai. The MMRDA renamed the station Valnai – Meeth Chowky on 10 April 2023 due to public demand.

== Station layout ==
| 2nd Floor | Side platform |
| 2nd Floor | Platform 1 | towards Dahisar (East) (Dahanukarwadi) → |
| 2nd Floor | Platform 2 | ← towards Andheri (West) (Malad (West)) |
| 2nd Floor | Side platform |
| 1st Floor | Mezzanine | Fare control, station agent, Metro QR ticket vending machines, crossover |
| Ground | Street level | Exit/Entrance |

=== Power and signaling system ===
Like all other stations and railways of Mumbai metro, Valnai station also uses 25,000 volt AC power system by overhead catenary to operate the trains.
