= Mahavir Nagar =

Place in western suburbs of Mumbai

Mahavir Nagar is a locality situated at Kandivali West i.e. western part of Mumbai. This area is one of the well known location of the western suburbs and has a majority of Gujarati population.

== Locality & Amenities ==
Mahavir Nagar
- Neighbourhood
- Country: India
- State: Maharashtra
- District: Mumbai Suburban
- City: Mumbai

Government
  - Type: Municipal Corporation
  - Body: Brihanmumbai Municipal Corporation (MCGM)
- Time zone: UTC+5:30 (IST)
- PIN: 400067
- Area code: 022
- Civic agency: BMC

Mahavir Nagar falls within the jurisdiction of the RS Ward of the Brihanmumbai Municipal Corporation (BMC). Positioned prominently between Kandivali West and Borivali West, this locale stands as an expanding residential hub. Renowned builders have been instrumental in contributing to its development, with its exceptional connectivity to various parts of Mumbai. The area hosts a range of residential initiatives, both completed and currently under construction. Noteworthy high-rise projects within Mahavir Nagar include NHP Anshul Heights, Chandak Harmony, Red Brick Ibis, Sethia Kalpavruksh Heights, and Bharat Asbury Park.

Mahavir Nagar is well known for its Khau Galli, which offers a wide variety of street food, and is considered a paradise for vegetarians. Sukhsagar Hi-Tech Hospital and United Multispeciality are some major hospitals in Mahavir Nagar. Key recreational facilities in and around Mahavir Nagar are the MCA Sachin Tendulkar Gymkhana, Kamla Vihar Sports Club, and Kandivali Recreation Club. The area also consists of many gardens and turfs for residentials.

Schools

- Kapol Vidyanidhi International School
- PJ Pancholia High School

Transport

The locality benefits from efficient public transportation through the operation of buses by BEST, offering connectivity to both Kandivali and Borivali railway stations. The Link Road and Metro through Mahavir Nagar connect to the business hub of Mindspace Malad, Infinity Mall, Inorbit Mall and Laxmi Industrial Estate, Andheri. This area is well connected to the major areas of north, western, and southern Mumbai through the Western railway line, SV Road, New Link Road, and the Western Express Highway.

- Kandivali station is approx. 2.4 km
- Borivali station is approx. 3.2 km
- Kandivali west metro station (Metro Line 2A) is 450 metres away.

== See also ==
- Borivali
- Charkop
- Gorai
- Kandivali
