= Oxford International School =

Oxford International School may refer to:

- Oxford International School (Panama)
- Oxford International School Bishkek, Bishkek, Kyrgyzstan
- Oxford International School, Kandivali, Kandivali, Maharashtra, India
- Oxford International School, Dhanmondi Thana, Dhaka, Bangladesh
