= Kandivli West metro station =

Mumbai Metro's Yellow Line 2A metro station

Kandivali (West) कांदिवली (पश्चिम)
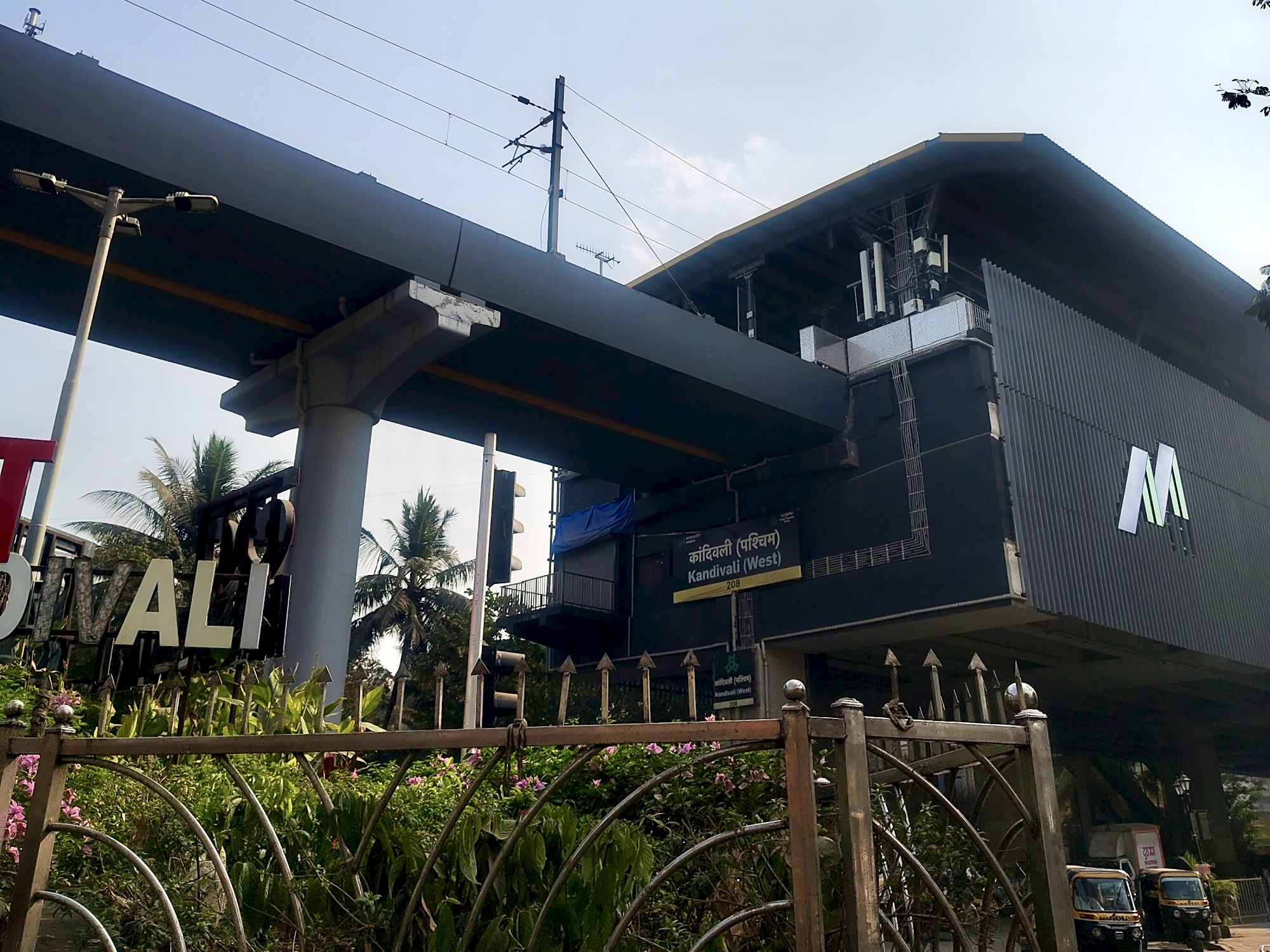

General information
- Location: Kandivli, Siddhivinayak Nagar, Kandivli West, Mumbai, Maharashtra 400067
- Coordinates: 19°12′51″N 72°50′14″E
- Owner: Mumbai Metropolitan Region Development Authority
- Operator: Maha Mumbai Metro Operation Corporation Ltd.
- Line: Line 2A
- Platforms: 2 side platforms

Construction
- Structure type: Elevated
- Parking: No

Other information
- Station code: 208

History
- Opened: 2 April 2022; 4 years ago

Services
Preceding station	Mumbai Metro	Following station
Dahanukarwadi towards Andheri (West)	Line 2A	Shimpoli towards Dahisar (East)
Route map
Yellow Line
Location

Kandivali (West) is an elevated metro station serving the Siddhivinayak Nagar neighbourhood of Kandivli on the North-South corridor of the Yellow Line 2A of the Mumbai Metro in Mumbai, India. This station is owned by the Mumbai Metropolitan Region Development Authority (MMRDA), and was inaugurated on 2 April 2022.

== History ==
J Kumar Infraprojects was awarded the contract to construct the station in June 2016. The MMRDA announced that electrification of the line had been completed on 26 May 2020. Kandivli West was opened to the public on 2 April 2022, along with the first phase of Line 2A.

== Station layout ==
2nd Floor	Side platform
2nd Floor	Platform 1	towards Dahisar (East) (Shimpoli) →
2nd Floor	Platform 2	← towards Andheri (West) (Dahanukarwadi)
2nd Floor	Side platform
1st Floor	Mezzanine	Fare control, station agent, Metro QR ticket vending machines, crossover
Ground	Street level	Exit/Entrance

=== Power and signaling system ===
Like all other stations and railways of Mumbai metro, Valnai station also uses 25,000 volt AC power system by overhead catenary to operate the trains.

== See also ==
- Charkop
- Mahavir Nagar
- Kandivli
- Kandivli railway station
