= Vazira Naka =

- Suburb
- Country: India
- State: Maharashtra
- District: Mumbai Suburban
- City: Mumbai

Government
  - Type: Municipal Corporation
  - Body: Brihanmumbai Municipal Corporation (MCGM)

Languages
  - Official: Marathi
- Time zone: UTC+5:30 (IST)
- Area code: 022
- Civic agency: BMC

Vazira Naka is a predominantly residential neighbourhood in the Borivali (West) suburb of Mumbai. It was developed by the Paranjpe Developers in the 1950s. Key landmarks are Ganesha temple & Don Bosco School.

== History ==
In October 2022, a 3-storey building in Vazira Naka collapsed.

== Education ==
- Suvidyalaya
- Don Bosco High School and Junior College
- Ava Elma vocational education college

== Religious Institutions ==
Swayambhu Ganesh Mandir

Shri Mahishamardini Temple
