= Bangur Nagar =

- Neighbourhood
- Location within Mumbai
- Coordinates: 19.167362°N 72.832252°E
- Country: India
- State: Maharashtra
- District: Mumbai City
- Metro: Mumbai

Languages
  - Official: Marathi
- Time zone: UTC+5:30 (IST)
- PIN: 400104
- Area code: 022
- Vehicle registration: MH 47
- Civic agency: BMC

Bangur Nagar is a residential area in Goregaon West, Mumbai, India. It was developed by the Bangur Group of Kolkata in the mid-1970s.

Bangur Nagar has more than 20 co-operative housing societies, most over 30 years old. The Hari niketan, Jal Mangal Deep, Jal Padma, Heeramani Ratan societies are few of the oldest. Among the newer buildings are Vasant Galaxy and Polaris. Bangur is a happening place. Here, most of the social activity is conducted by various Charitable Trusts like Bangur Ramayan Mandal Charitable Trust, Agrawal Seva Samiti., Bangur Nagar Nagrik Sangh, etc.

Bangur Nagar is in Mumbai North West Lok Sabha constituency and Goregaon (Vidhan Sabha constituency) Vidhan Sabha constituency. In May 2024, the Bangur Nagar Residents Association, representing 54 housing associations, decided to boycott the Lok Sabha elections to protest the lack of open spaces in the area. They demanded restoration of playgrounds and gardens under the Development Plan 2034.

Marathi and Hindi are the most spoken languages in this region.

== Facilities ==
=== Schools ===
- Bangur Nagar Vidya Bhavan school and Junior College of Commerce and Economics

Plot No 9 Bangur Nagar, Goregaon West, Mumbai - 400090 Maharashtra

- MTS Khalsa High School and Junior College of Commerce

Plot No 143, Sitaram Mandir Road, Jankalyan CHS, Bangur Nagar, Goregaon West, Mumbai, Maharashtra 400104.

- Vivek Vidyalaya and Junior College

S.S. Shankar Marg, Siddharth Nagar, Goregaon West, Siddharth Nagar 4, Goregaon West, Mumbai, Maharashtra 400104

- St. Thomas Academy

M.G. Road, Cardinal Gracias Nagar, Mitha Nagar, Goregaon West, Mumbai, Maharashtra 400062

=== Places of worship ===
- Ram Mandir
- Ayyappa Temple
- Hanuman Mandir
- Kali Mata Mandir
- Jain Temple
- Khalsa Gurudwara
- St. Peter's Marthoma Church
- Rosary Church
- Sai Baba Temple

=== Banks ===
- The Shamrao Vithal Co-operative Bank Ltd.
- State Bank of India
- Indian Overseas Bank
- Canara Bank
- Punjab National Bank
- ICICI Bank
- HDFC Bank
- Kotak Mahindra Bank
- RBL Bank

=== ATMs ===
- State Bank of India
- ICICI
- SVC bank
- IOB
- HDFC

=== Post office ===
- Bangur Nagar Post Office

=== Parks ===
There are two big parks (Laxmi park and Visnu park) which are often leased out for marriage functions. These open spaces are not available to the public and do not have recreational activities.

== Connectivity ==
The Mahatma Gandhi Road connects the Goregaon Railway Station with Bangur Nagar. The BEST provides bus services from Goregaon Railway station - 262 and 204. Besides, over a dozen BEST bus routes connect Bangur Nagar with North and South Mumbai.

The Mumbai Metro 2A line serves the area with the Bangur Nagar metro station at the southern end of Bangur Nagar.

== Nearby landmarks ==
Inorbit Mall, HyperCity and Mindspace Office Complex are near Bangur Nagar. DMart has opened a branch at Bangur Nagar.
