= Thakur village =

Coordinates: 19.210206°N 72.872980°E

- Neighbourhood
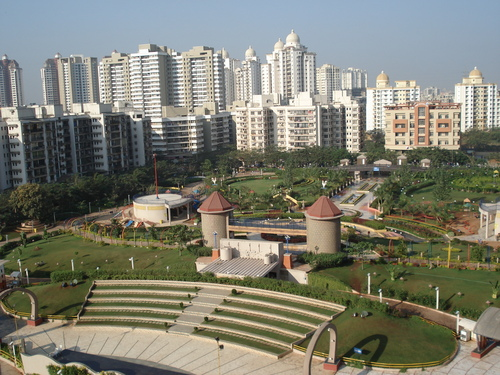
- Thakur village

- Location within Mumbai
- Country: India
- State: Maharashtra
- District: Mumbai Suburban
- City: Mumbai
- Named for: Thakur Manoj Singh

Government
  - Type: Municipal Corporation
  - Body: Brihanmumbai Municipal Corporation (MCGM)

Languages
  - Official: Marathi
- Time zone: UTC+5:30 (IST)
- PIN: 400101
- Area code: 022
- Civic agency: BMC

Thakur village is a densely populated residential locality in Kandivali, Mumbai, India. It is located to the east of the Western Express Highway, which is part of the National Highway 8.

== See also ==
- Magathane Assembly constituency
