= Chembur Causeway =

Causeway in Bombay, India

Route information
- Status: In use
- Existed: circa 1846–present

Location
- Country: India

Highway system
- Roads in India; Expressways; National; State; Asian

The Chembur causeway is a causeway in Bombay, India. It was built about 1846. It is 3,105 feet (946 m) long, from twenty-two to twenty-four feet wide, and from five to twelve feet high. The causeway is used at all seasons, the chief traffic, besides passengers, being grass, rice, fruit, and vegetables on their way to Bombay. It is repaired as part of the Kurla-Trombay road out of the Thana Local Funds. There is no toll.
