= Shimpoli =

- Village
- Country: India
- State: Maharashtra
- District: Mumbai Suburban
- City: Mumbai

Government
  - Type: Municipal Corporation
  - Body: Brihanmumbai Municipal Corporation (MCGM)

Languages
  - Official: Marathi
- Time zone: UTC+5:30 (IST)
- PIN: 400092
- Area code: 022
- Civic agency: BMC

Shimpoli is a Village in the north Mumbai, located in the western suburb of Borivali, Shimpoli also known as "Shimpavali". It is a 15-minute walk from Borivali railway station.

Shimpoli has a MTNL telephone exchange which mostly controls telecom in Borivali (West). The "Shyamaprasad Mookherjee Flyover" is situated very near to Shimpoli road thus Borivali (East) is at a walkable distance. The Shimpoli road stretches from the S.V. Road to the Chickoowadi, which is a highly affluent residential locality. A number of restaurants and fast food corners have come up in Shimpoli road as well.

Shimpoli started out as a small village community which has now receded to a corner of the locality to accommodate the highrise apartment blocks. it is connected to Line 2 (Mumbai Metro) by the Shimpoli metro station.
