= Dahanukarwadi metro station =

Mumbai Metro's Yellow Line 2A metro station

Dahanukarwadi डहाणूकरवाडी

General information
- Location: Kandivli, Mahatma Gandhi Nagar, Kandivli West, Mumbai, Maharashtra 400067
- Coordinates: 19°12′22″N 72°50′05″E
- Owner: Mumbai Metropolitan Region Development Authority
- Operator: Maha Mumbai Metro Operation Corporation Ltd.
- Line: Line 2A
- Platforms: 2 side platforms
- Tracks: 3

Construction
- Structure type: Elevated

Other information
- Station code: 209

History
- Opened: 2 April 2022; 4 years ago

Services
Preceding station	Mumbai Metro	Following station
Valnai–Meeth Chowky towards Andheri (West)	Line 2A	Kandivli (West) towards Dahisar (East)
Location

Dahanukarwadi is an elevated metro station serving the Dahanukarwadi neighbourhood of Kandivli on the North-South corridor of the Yellow Line 2A of Mumbai Metro in Mumbai, India. This station is owned by the Mumbai Metropolitan Region Development Authority (MMRDA) and was inaugurated on 2 April 2022.

== History ==
J Kumar Infraprojects was awarded the contract to construct the station in June 2016. The MMRDA announced that electrification of the line had been completed on 26 May 2020. Dahanukarwadi was opened to the public on 2 April 2022, along with the first phase of Line 2A.

== Station layout ==
2nd Floor	Platform 1A	Pocket track toward Charkop depot →
2nd Floor	Side platform
2nd Floor	Platform 1	toward Dahisar (East) (Kandivli (West)) →
2nd Floor	Platform 2	← toward Andheri (West) (Valnai–Meeth Chowky)
2nd Floor	Side platform
1st Floor	Mezzanine	Fare control, station agent, Metro Card vending machines, crossover
G	Street level	Exit/Entrance

=== Power and signaling system ===
Like all other stations and railways of Mumbai metro, Dahanaukarwadi station also uses 25,000 volt AC power system by overhead catenary to operate the trains.
