= Aram Nagar =

Neighborhood in Andheri, Mumbai, India

Aram Nagar आराम नगर
- Neighbourhood
- Location in Mumbai, India
- Coordinates: 19.1339874°N 72.813382°E
- Country: India
- State: Maharashtra
- District: Mumbai Suburban
- City: Mumbai
- Suburb: Andheri

Government
  - Type: Municipal Corporation
  - Body: Brihanmumbai Municipal Corporation (MCGM)
- Time zone: UTC+5:30 (IST)
- Pincode: 400061
- Civic agency: BMC

Aram Nagar is a neighborhood in Andheri, a suburb of Mumbai in India. It spans 20 acres and is located adjacent to Versova, in Andheri West of Mumbai.

There are numerous casting agencies, offices of major production houses, and advertising agencies in Aram Nagar. It is referred to as the 'Silicon Valley' for India's media and entertainment industry. The rentals in Aram Nagar are known for their affordability, and the available spaces offer flexible lease terms, making it particularly suitable for independent filmmakers operating on limited budgets.

== History ==
During the World War II, this area housed a barrack of the British Indian Army. The Aram Nagar colony was utilized by the British as a training center for anti-submarine operations. In 1947, the government transformed it into a transit camp to accommodate migrating populations. It provided refuge to people who had returned from Pakistan during the partition.

Until the year 2000, it remained a typical residential area. After the year 2000, many offices related to films opened here transforming the area into a hub for aspiring individuals in the entertainment or film industry. Over the past two decades, Aram Nagar has gained recognition as a gateway to Bollywood. Independent filmmakers like Ram Gopal Varma, Sudhir Mishra, Anurag Kashyap, and Tigmanshu Dhulia established their careers from Aram Nagar.

In 2016, it was reported that the Brihanmumbai Municipal Corporation (BMC) undertook the demolition of more than 75 unauthorized structures within the Aram Nagar area.

== Demography ==
The area is divided into two parts, Phase-1 and Phase-2, and comprises approximately 900 houses. Around 3,000 individuals striving to establish themselves in the entertainment industry reside here. Aram Nagar is a diverse community, with residents from 10 to 12 different states across India.
