= Kannamwar Nagar =

Neighbourhood in Mumbai

Kannamwar Nagar is a locality situated in Vikhroli east, on eastern express highway. Kannamwar Nagar is on the eastern side of the Vikhroli railway station and is known for buildings built by MHADA. It is considered as one of the biggest housing colonies in India and one of the biggest workers housing colonies in Asia.

The name was given to this area on name of Mr. Marotrao Shambshio Kannamwar who was an Indian politician who served as Chief Minister of Maharashtra from 20 November 1962 to 24 November 1963.

Kannamwar Nagar lies somewhat in the centre of Mumbai and provides easy access to all cities through the roads that run through it. Agra Road, officially called the Eastern Express Highway connects it to Thane, Dadar, Chembur and Vashi. It is well connected by Shastri Marg on its western part which connects it to Bandra, Jogeshwari and other western suburbs.

A proposal for a bridge has been made, which is to be built over the Thane Creek from Kannamwar Nagar off the eastern express highway to Kopar Khairane in Navi Mumbai, thereby providing a much needed third bridge linking Mumbai and Navi Mumbai. The popular bus routes operating from this area are 394 and 397 (to kannamwar nagar), 353 (to Wadala), 354 (to dadar), 388 (to Seepz depot) and 185 (to jogeshwari). From vikhroli west, Route No 7 (to Backbay) is the most patronised.

== Residential ==
In Kannamwar Nagar there are more than 300 Mhada Buildings

It is also one of the 56 Transit Camps developed by MHADA in Mumbai.

Currently, Vikhroli is undergoing huge transformation that will make it look like a modern town.

Kindergartens:

- Learning Tree Preschool

Schools/Colleges:

- Asmita College of Law
- Dr Babasaheb Ambedkar Vidyalaya
- Utkarsh Bal Mandir School
- Vikas High School and Jr College
- Abhay International School
- Madyamik Vidyala

Out of these, Udayachal Schools have been the best in terms of imparting and setting a class in education in Mumbai. Also it is ranked as one of the top schools according to a recent survey.

Gardens/Playgrounds:

- Dharamveer Sambhaji Maharaj (Circle) Ground.
- Ravindra Mhatre Ground.
- Balgandharva Balodyan (Trikoni).
- Shaantivan.
- Veermata Jijau Mai Garden.
- Priyadarshani Udyan
- Hatti Garden
- Bombay Municipal Corporation Udyan
- Ganesh Maidan

Hospitals:

- Krantiveer Mahatma Jyotiba Phule Hospital
- Shushrusha Hospital.

Hotels/Restaurants:

- Red Chilly Classic Chinese Cuisine
- Hotel Praveen
- Hotel Krish
- Hotel Adarsh

There is a proposal of Skywalk bridge connecting East to west due to lot of accident mishaps near the railway line crossing.

Kannamwar Nagar is a predominantly middle-class residential neighbourhood in Vikhroli, Mumbai, known for its relatively peaceful suburban environment. Ongoing redevelopment in nearby Tagore Nagar may influence the area's future development.
