= Koombarwara =

Housing society in Mumbai, India

Koombarwara is a part of Bombay. It had 759.66 people per acre in 1881. It was one of the most overpopulated spots on earth. The Tenth Ward in Manhattan was even more crowded in 1894.
