= Mogra Village =

Village in Maharashtra

- suburb
- Interactive map of Mogra Village
- Coordinates: 19.126589°N 72.848558°E
- Country: India
- State: Maharashtra
- District: Mumbai Suburban
- Metro: Mumbai

Languages
  - Official: Marathi
- Time zone: UTC+5:30 (IST)

Mogra Village (also known as Mogre Pada) is a small area in Mumbai, Maharashtra, India; which lies in the suburb of Mumbai near Andheri railway station.
