= Amboli, Mumbai =

Amboli Ambivali Gaon
- Neighbourhood
- Location within Mumbai
- Coordinates: 19.1293°N 72.8434°E
- Country: India
- State: Maharashtra
- District: Mumbai Suburban
- City: Mumbai

Government
  - Type: Municipal corporation
  - Body: Brihanmumbai Municipal Corporation (MCGM)

Languages
  - Official: Marathi
- Time zone: UTC+5:30 (IST)
- PIN: 400058
- Area code: 022
- Vehicle registration: MH 02

Amboli is in Andheri (West), Mumbai, Maharashtra. Earlier known as Ambolim, it is situated very close to Andheri railway station and Jogeshwari railway station. At its heart, it also has a playground known as Joe and Helen Ground.

== History ==
Amboli was primarily inhabited by Christians, East Indians and tribal people called Waarlis. There were a handful of houses in and around the village. Amboli was laden with green fields and numerous mango and coconut trees. The name Amboli also stemmed from the fact that there was a massive mango orchard in the neighbourhood.

During the late 1980s and early '90s the area was also notorious for gang rivalries, especially the Amboli village.

One of the most notable attractions of Amboli is the Church of St. Blaise . A Bollywood film studio "Filmalaya" (owned by Mukherjee-Samarth family) is located on Caesar Road in Amboli.

Closest Metro Station: Azad Nagar metro station

Bus stops at Amboli: Amboli Naka, Filmalaya, Shiv Mandir, Amboli Gaav (Village), Ramesh Nagar, RajKumar and Helen Joe Garden.

== See also ==
- Andheri
