= Kandivali =

Kandivali Khandolee
- Suburb
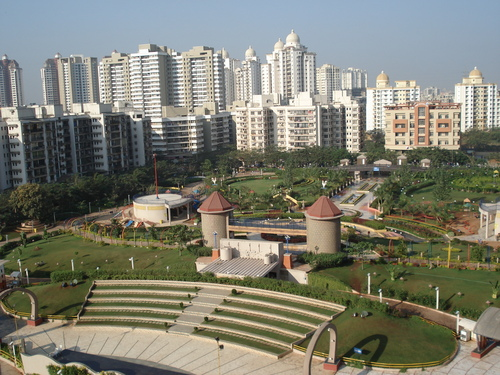
- Thakur village in Kandivali (East)

- Location within India Location within Maharashtra Location within Mumbai
- Coordinates: 19.204511°N 72.837639°E
- Country: India
- State: Maharashtra
- District: Mumbai Suburban
- City: Mumbai

Government
  - Type: Municipal Corporation
  - Body: Brihanmumbai Municipal Corporation (MCGM)

Languages
  - Official: Marathi
- Time zone: UTC+5:30 (IST)
- PIN: 400067, 400101
- Area code: 022
- Vehicle registration: MH-47
- Lok Sabha constituency: Mumbai North
- Vidhan Sabha constituency: Charkop, Borivali (cover western parts of the suburb); Kandivli East, Magathane (cover eastern parts of the suburb)

Kandivali or Kandivli (Pronunciation: [kaːn̪d̪iʋəliː]) formerly Khandolee is a suburb in the north of Mumbai, Maharashtra, India.

== History ==
Kandivali is mentioned as Kāndhvaḻī (कांधवळी) in the 15th–17th century Marathi-language text Mahikavatichi Bakhar; the name derives from a term for Mangroves.

In the 16th century, Kandivali consisted of a number of villages including Kandivali (also known as Kandol), Bunder Pakhadi Koliwada, and Charkop. The other old settlements in Kandivli were villages occupied by the local community - the East Indian Community, Bhandari people , and Koli - who are recognized as the original native inhabitants of Mumbai. These communities are still living in Kandivali. Artifacts found near Kandivali indicate that the region was inhabited in the Stone Age.

The Kandivali railway station was built more than 100 years ago, in 1907, then known as Khandolee. The station derived its name from the East Indian village of Condolim. Earth and stones from Paran, a hillock east of the Kandivali railway station, were quarried to reclaim the Bombay Backbay. On this account, a railway line was opened, a workshop was erected, and a number of dwelling houses were constructed for officers and workmen numbering thousands. The area around the Western Urban Road between Malad and Kandivali had numerous stone quarries and was once famous for Malad Stone. Many heritage buildings in Mumbai were constructed with Malad stone between 1860 and 1930, the most notable among them are David Sassoon Library, Bombay House and the Western Railway building, at Churchgate.

During the plagues of the 1900s, the Fonsecas from Bandra migrated to Kandivali. They initially settled down to the east of Kandivali at Akurli and then moved to the west at Poisar. This is where they thrived, and a few families still reside to this day. All three major communities have their shrines in Poisar.

== Landmarks and localities ==
The Church of Our Lady of Assumption, located off M.G. Road, was built in 1630 and is known as one of the oldest churches of Mumbai. It represents the early presence of the East Indian & Christian Koli community in the region.This community had built a St.Joseph High School. Which was considered as the best english medium school in the 90's.This school is a convent school running under the influence of the Assumption Church.

The pond located at Shankar Mandir, Selva Ganapati Mandir, situated near M.G Road, Anna Nagar, Kandivali East, was established in 1920 by the Dravid Tamil community. The celebration of Ganesh Utsav at this Ganapati Mandir has been a cherished tradition since 1963, making it one of the oldest Ganesh utsav celebrations in Kandivali.

Kandivli village is commonly used for immersions during Ganesh Chaturthi.

A 150-year-old shrine dedicated to Shri Karsangli Akurli Mata, known as Varahi Mata Temple, is located at Shankar Lane, and is considered an important religious site in the area.

In 1896, during the devastating plague epidemic, many local people of Bunder Pakhadi Koliwada lost their lives. In this difficult time, the Pereira family generously donated land at the entrance of Bunder Pakhadi Koliwada to the local Koli community for the construction of the Holy Cross. During the plague period, a fisherman named Anton Farsha Soz built the Holy Cross as a sacred place of prayer and hope for the people of the village. As the villagers gathered there to pray, they strongly believed that the Holy Cross was miraculous, bringing blessings, protection, and healing to the community. From that time onwards, the people of Bunder Pakhadi Koliwada began regularly coming together to offer prayers at the Holy Cross. Since then, every year on 1st May, the Feast of the Holy Cross Chapel is celebrated with great devotion and joy. The Holy Cross is beautifully decorated with flowers, lights, and firecrackers, creating a festive and spiritual atmosphere throughout the village. The entire Koli community unites in prayer and celebration, while warmly welcoming the Bishop, Fathers, and relatives from nearby villages with a traditional band procession and joyful festivities. The Feast of the Holy Cross remains a symbol of faith, unity, hope, and the rich cultural heritage of Bunder Pakhadi Koliwada.

Holy Cross Chapel located in Bunder Pakhadi Koliwada was built in 1907. Bunder Pakhadi Koliwada is a traditional fishing village where both Christian Koli and Hindu Koli families live. There are more than 200 families residing here, and the village is believed to be more than 400 years old.

Kandivali West, together with Kandivali East, Bunder Pakhadi, Charkop and Poisar, Mahavir Nagar, Thakur Village constitute the R-South ward of BMC.

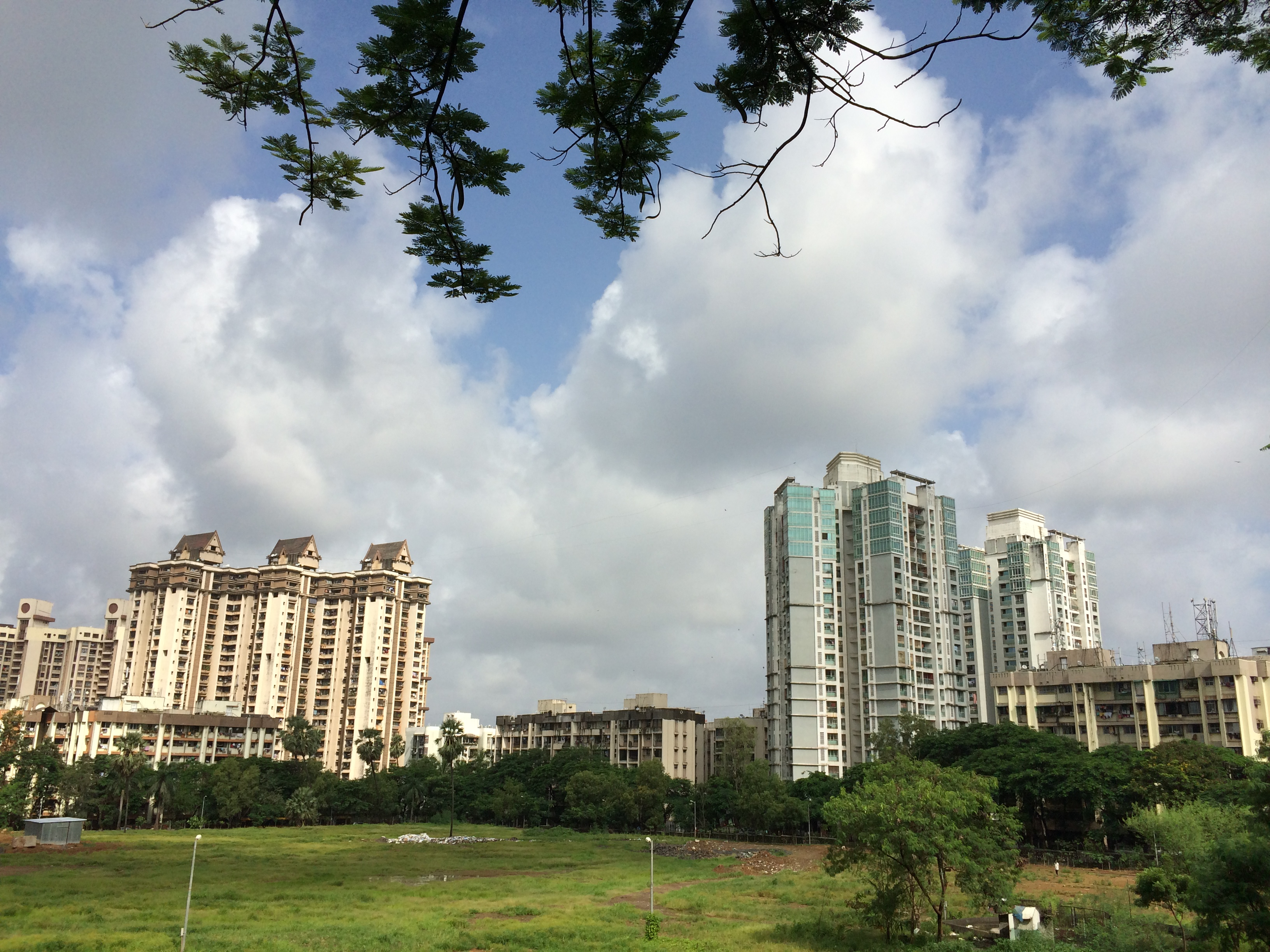
Housing society buildings at Lokhandwala Township

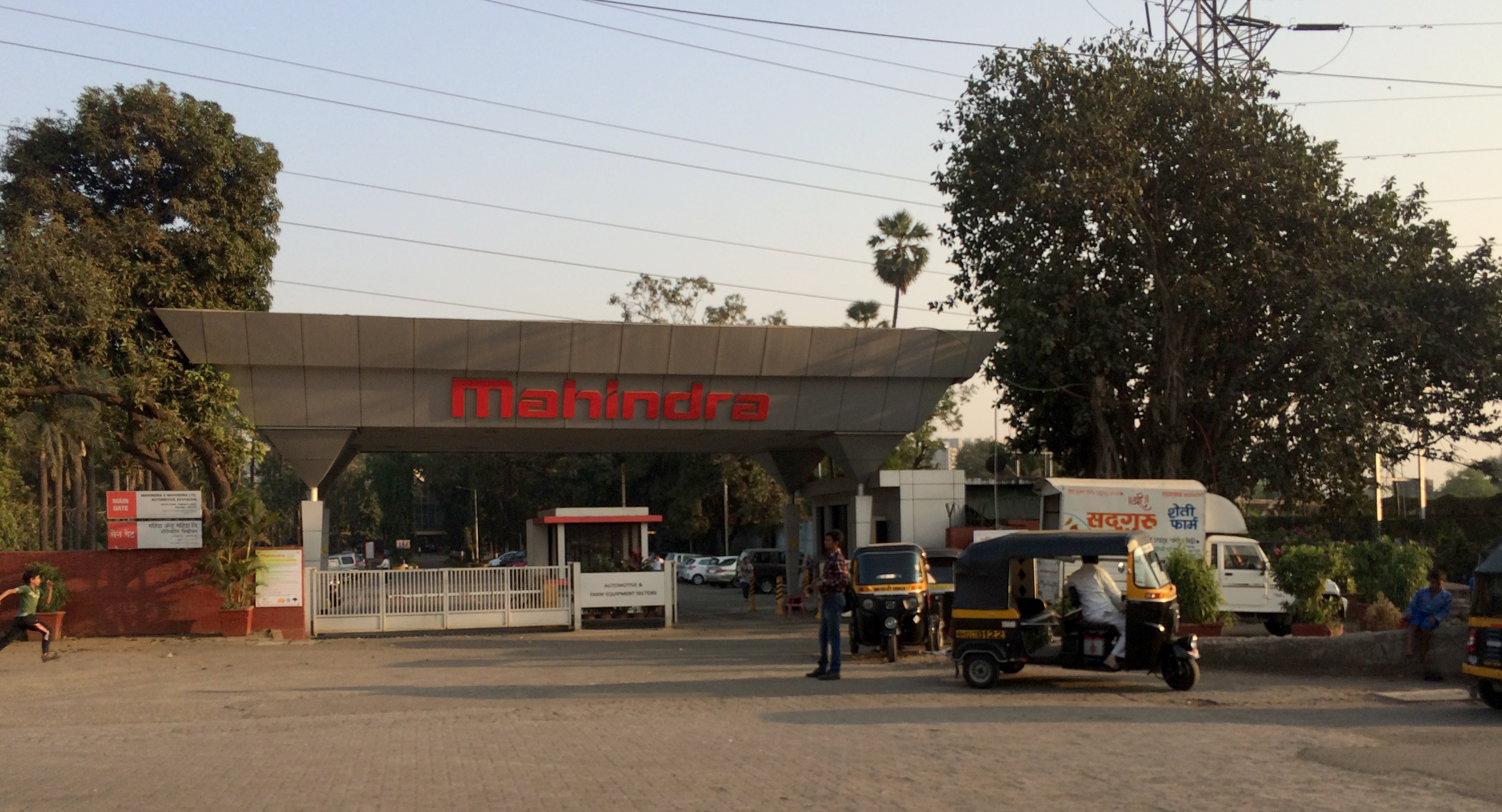
Mahindra & Mahindra's Kandivali Unit, Auto Sector Main gate overlooking Western Express Highway was established in 1948.

The Mahindra & Mahindra plant occupies a 63-acre (250,000 m^{2}) built-up area and employs over 3,000. Industrial complexes such as Akurli Industrial Estate in the east and Charkop Industrial Estate are in the western part. The Times of India printing press. The Sports Authority of India has a huge training ground for the popular football team Mahindra United.

== Transportation ==
Kandivali railway station is a busy station on the Western Line of the Mumbai Suburban Railway. Poisar Bus Depot, one of the oldest BEST bus depots, is located on S.V. Road in the western part of the neighbourhood. Road connectivity is provided by means of the Western Urban Road on the east, and S.V. Road and Link Road on the west. The BEST bus depot is close to the railway station on the eastern side of the neighbourhood and is the point of origin for localities in Kandivali (East) like Ashok Nagar, Hanuman Nagar, Damu Nagar, and Samata Nagar. Thakur Village, and Thakur Complex.

Two lines of the Mumbai Metro (Line 2 and Line 7) pass through Kandivli. Line 2 passes through Link Road on the western part; Kandivli West and Dahanukarwadi are the metro stations, whereas Poisar and Akurli stations of Line 7 are situated on the express highway i.e. eastern side of Kandivali.
