= Yellow Line (Mumbai Metro) =

Metro line of the Mumbai Metro

2 Yellow Line (Line 2A & Line 2B)
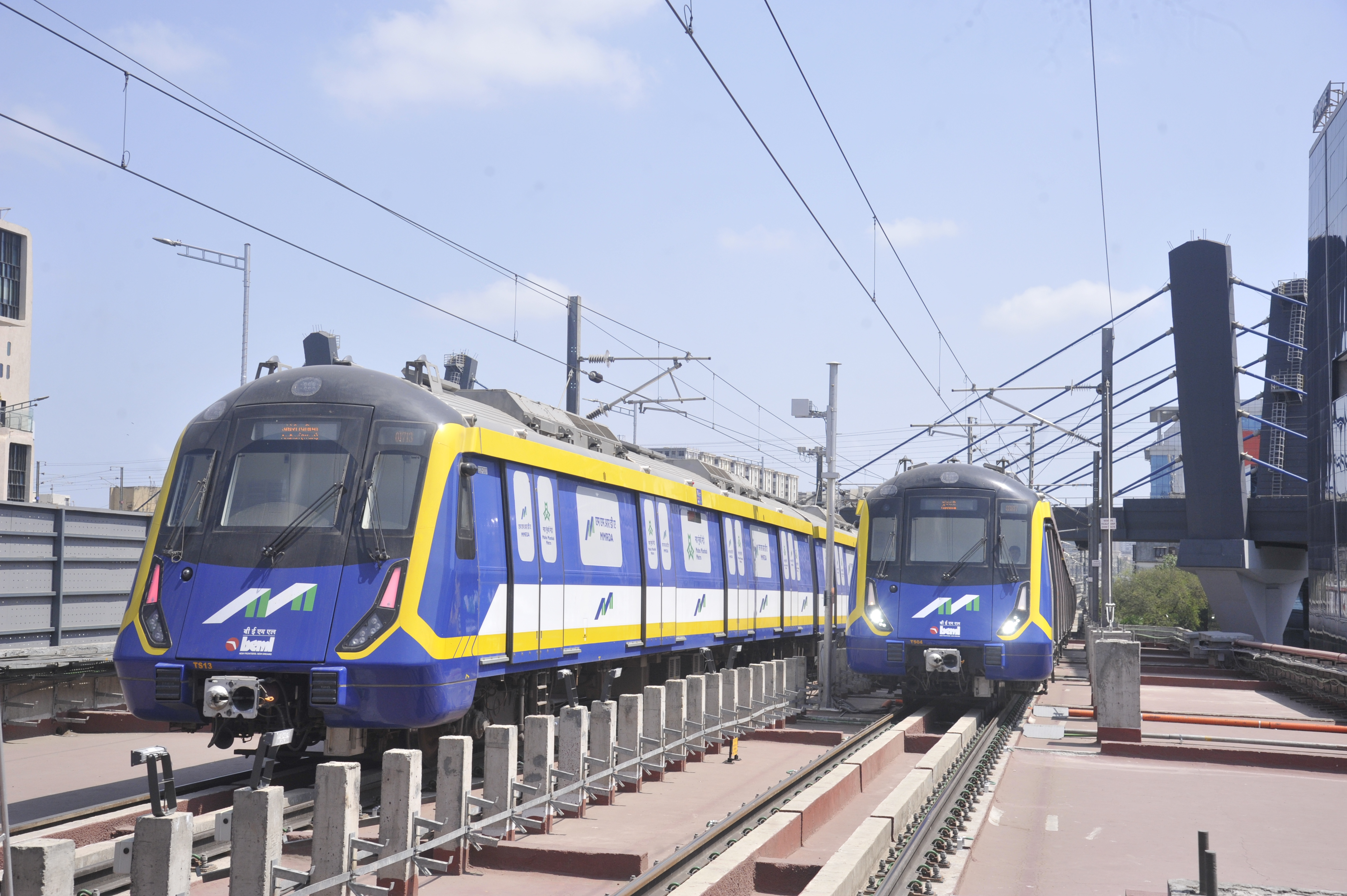
- BEML rolling stock of Mumbai Metro Line 2

Overview
- Status: Fully Operational: Line 2A; Partly Operational: Line 2B
- Owner: Mumbai Metropolitan Region Development Authority
- Locale: Mumbai Suburban district
- Termini: Dahisar (East); Mandale
- Connecting lines: Line 1; Line 7
- Stations: 17
- Website: Line 2A; Line 2B

Service
- Type: Rapid transit
- System: Mumbai Metro
- Operator: Maha Mumbai Metro Operation Corporation Ltd.
- Depot(s): Charkop (2A); Mandale (2B)
- Rolling stock: BEML
- Daily ridership: 212,000 (July 2023)

History
- Work began: November 2016
- Opened: 2 April 2022; 4 years ago

Technical
- Line length: 18.589 km (11.551 mi)
- Number of tracks: 2
- Character: Grade-separated, elevated
- Track gauge: 1,435 mm (4 ft 8 1/2 in) standard gauge
- Electrification: 25 kV 50 Hz AC overhead catenary

The Yellow Line (Line 2A & Line 2B) is a rapid transit metro line of the Mumbai Metro in the city of Mumbai, Maharashtra, India. The line connects Dahisar in the northwest with Mandale in Mankhurd, via Andheri, BKC, and Chembur in the east. Phase One of Line 2A was partially opened on 2 April 2022, from Dahisar (East) to Dahanukarwadi. Line 2A was fully opened on 19 January 2023 from Dahanukarwadi to Andheri (West) and consisted of eight new stations.

Construction on the first section of the line, called Metro 2A (between Dahisar and D.N. Road), began in November 2016 and was completed in April 2022. This section will be 18.589 km (11.551 mi) long, and comprise 17 of the 39 stations that form part of this route. The new 9.5 km (5.903 mi) section from Dahanukarwadi to DN Nagar, was inaugurated on 19 January 2023, by PM Narendra Modi. On 7 April 2026, a 5.8 km (3.6 mi) section of Line 2B from Diamond Garden to Mandale was made operational for passengers.

== Planning ==
Yellow Line
Line number	Station		Opening	Distance
Line number	From	To	Opening	Distance
2A	Dahisar (East)	Dahanukarwadi	2 April 2022	18.6 km (11.6 mi)
2A	Dahanukarwadi	Andheri (West)	19 January 2023	18.6 km (11.6 mi)
2B	Maharashtranagar Mandale	Deshbhakt N.G. Acharya Udyan-Diamond Garden, Chembur	8 April 2026	6.411 km (3.984 mi)
2B	Deshbhakt N.G. Acharya Udyan-Diamond Garden, Chembur	Chembur	13 August 2026	6.411 km (3.984 mi)
Total				25.011 km (15.541 mi)

=== Public private partnership with RInfra ===
A 38.24 km (23.76 mi) long Colaba–Bandra–Charkop line was proposed as the Yellow Line in the original Mumbai Metro masterplan unveiled by the MMRDA in 2004. A 13.37 km (8.31 mi) long Bandra-Kurla–Mankhurd line and a 7.5 km (4.66 mi) line from Charkop to Dahisar were proposed as Line 3 and Line 4, respectively, in the same plan. In the updated masterplan, the proposed Charkop–Bandra–Mankhurd and Charkop–Dahisar lines were merged into a single Dahisar–Bandra–Mankhurd line, which would have been 32 km (19.88 mi) and had 27 stations. This was planned to be the second corridor of the Mumbai Metro. Like Line 1, this corridor was also proposed to be constructed on a public private partnership (PPP) model.

Then President Pratibha Patil launched the project in August 2009. The MMRDA appointed Reliance Infrastructure (RInfra), in consortium with SNC Lavalin Inc., Canada and Reliance Communication, through an international competitive bidding process to carry out this phase of the project, and the concession agreement was signed with the RInfra-led consortium in January 2010. The project was proposed to be implemented on build–operate–transfer (BOT) basis for a concession period of 35 years, with an extension clause of another 10 years. The MMRDA estimated the project would cost ₹8,250 crore (US$860 million), while Reliance Infrastructure estimated it would cost ₹ 11,000 crore. Construction was planned to begin in August 2010 and conclude by mid-2013. However, construction work had yet to begin by December 2012, leading to calls for Yellow Line to be cancelled outright.

The line's construction was handicapped by the lack of available land for carsheds at Charkop and Mankhurd; the Coastal Regulation Zone (CRZ) laws forbade construction on the land that had been selected by the MMRDA. The Union Ministry of Environment and Forests (MoEF) refused to give clearance for the depots. MMRDA officials plan to solve the problem by shifting the location of the proposed rake depot to Malwani, near Malad. The 19 hectares (0.19 km^{2}) plot does not come under the purview of the CRZ laws and therefore will not require environmental clearances. The MMRDA has said that they have not ruled out an underground line, claiming that they had considered a combination of an elevated and underground alignment but had deemed it impossible due to the large land requirement for ramps and slip roads.

On 6 September 2012, the MMRDA sent a letter to Reliance Infrastructure asking them to start work on the metro immediately or face legal action. In response to the letter, RInfra blamed the government and the MMRDA for the delayed construction work. They said that the government had failed to fulfill its contractual obligation to provide the necessary land, right-of-way permits and clearances. On 8 February 2013, then RInfra CEO Sumit Banerjee claimed that the project had not advanced because the MMRDA had failed to fulfill its share of the responsibilities. The state government had since been considering alternative sites for the depot, which might have led to complete change in the alignment of the line and could have required re-bidding for the project. On 9 August 2013, DNA reported that an MMRDA official had informed them that a 27-acre (11 ha) plot that was to be used as the casting yard for Line 2, was planned to be marked for use as a casting yard for Line 3. The paper called the move "a clear indication" that Yellow Line"will not take off in the near future." Chief Minister Prithviraj Chavan told the media on 30 August 2013 that "it is now clear that Mumbai's Metro II project will now not happen."

On 13 November 2014, Reliance Infrastructure announced that it had terminated the agreement between the MMTPL and the Maharashtra government. RInfra stated, "Due to non-fulfilment of various critical obligations by Maharashtra government and the Mumbai Metropolitan Region Development Authority (MMRDA), the project could not take off. Even after four years, despite the best efforts of the Maharashtra government, various project impediments could not be resolved." The MMRDA issued a statement confirming that the agreement was terminated with mutual consent. The MMRDA also clarified that the Yellow Line project had not been cancelled and will be constructed by the Mumbai Metro Railway Corp. Ltd (MMRCL) under an engineering, procurement and construction (EPC) model.

=== EPC model ===
In September 2013, the MMRDA appointed RITES to study the feasibility of constructing the proposed 32 km (19.9 mi) metro line underground. RITES also studied the feasibility of extending the corridor and merging the 7.5 km (4.7 mi) Charkop-Dahisar metro, proposed as a separate line, with this project. RITES submitted its final report to the MMRDA in the last week of May 2014, concluding that constructing the metro underground and extending it up to Dahisar was feasible. The merged Dahisar-Bandra-Mankhurd line would be 40.2 km (25.0 mi) long and have 37 underground stations. The estimated cost of construction of this line was ₹28,900 crore, 134% higher than the originally estimated costs of ₹7,660 crore for the Charkop-Bandra-Mankhurd line and ₹4,680 crore for the Charkop-Dahisar corridor. RITES proposed the construction of a major car depot at Oshiwara and a minor car depot at Mandale, Mankhurd on sites that were a mix of publicly and privately held land. The extension of the line to Mankhurd was proposed to resolve land acquisition issues, as land was available for the construction of a depot at Mankhurd.

In June 2015, the MMRDA proposed building an 18.6 km (11.6 mi) line from Dahisar East to Andheri East, and a 12 km (7.5 mi) line from Bandra Kurla Complex to Mankhurd, as part of a plan to build 6 new metro lines at a total estimated cost of ₹64,000 crore (US$6.6 billion). The MMRDA approved the detailed project report for the line in August 2015. The report estimated the cost of the project as ₹12,000 crore (US$1.2 billion). On 15 June 2015, the MMRDA announced that it would combine the two stretches and implement the Yellow Line of the Mumbai Metro in three parts - Dahisar East-DN Nagar (Metro 2A), DN Nagar-BKC (Metro 2B), and BKC-Mankhurd (Metro 2C). On 1 July 2015, it was announced that the MMRDA was allotted a 22-acre (8.9 ha) plot in Mankhurd adjacent to the Sion Panvel highway for the Metro carshed. The land was under dispute between the MMRDA and the State Home Ministry for the construction of a jail.

The plan was later modified to build the line in two sections - Dahisar-DN Nagar (Metro 2A) and DN Nagar-Mankhurd (Metro 2B). Metro 2A was approved by the Maharashtra Government on 6 October 2015. In November 2015, the Department of Economic Affairs (DEA) cleared the MMRDA's request to secure a loan from the Asian Development Bank (ADB). The Maharashtra Cabinet approved the Metro 2B corridor on 27 September 2016. Half of the project cost will be funded by the Centre and the State Government, while the remaining will be financed through loans from the Asian Development Bank and the New Development Bank. The Metro 2B corridor was proposed to be 23.5 km (14.6 mi) long and to have 22 stations. The project was estimated to cost ₹10,986 crore, including land acquisition cost of ₹1,274 crore.

In February 2020, the MMRDA metropolitan commissioner R.A. Rajeev, stated that Yellow Line would be identified as the Yellow Line. A study by World Resources Institute (WRI) India, published in May 2021, estimated that Metro 2A and Line 7 had the potential to create 1.1 million jobs in the city.

=== Elevated Metro 2B ===
The elevated Metro 2B line received permission from the Central Railway (CR) to be built at a height of 22 metres over the Central Line to accommodate CR's plan to construct an elevated CST-Panvel high-speed rail line and an elevated CST-Kalyan line. The MMRDA objected to the height band due to concerns over difficulty involved in operating a metro line at that height as well as evacuating passengers to ground level in case of an emergency. The Central Railway later granted the MMRDA permission to build Metro 2B at a height of 13 metres, with the CST-Panvel elevated line proposed to take a height of 22 metres.

The plan to build Metro 2B as an elevated corridor faced opposition. Residents of SV Road gathered at the Sacred Heart Boys’ School in Khar to protest the Metro 2B project on 12 August 2017. Petitions against the project were also filed in the Bombay High Court by the Juhu Vile Parle Development Cooperative Housing Association, the Gulmohar Area Society Welfare Group, and the Balabhai Nanavati Hospital. Some Mumbai residents protested the project on 5 October 2017 at Santacruz and Mahim. Several celebrities including Javed Akthar participated in the protest. Metro 2B also faced legal issues concerning the section between Indira Nagar and Nanavati Hospital that passes through a funnel area of the Juhu Aerodrome.

In June 2018, the MMRDA filed an affidavit in the Bombay High Court stating that it had "taken into consideration all the aspects of the project, including the pros and cons of underground and elevated Metro, and have taken a conscious decision to go for an elevated Metro". The agency stated that there was insufficient land available to build the metro partly underground, as large quantities of land were required to build the ramps going underground and coming back overground. The agency also noted that an underground metro would take 2 years to build and would cost over 5.5 times more per kilometer than an elevated line. The MMRDA stated that the design of the metro was a "highly technical issue" and that the petitioners did not have the required scientific experience to evaluate it. In August 2019, the Court directed the petitioners to explain why they thought the MMRDA had selected an elevated line instead of an underground line, after the petitioner's advocate stated that he "had not come prepared" and did not know if there was a scientific reason behind the MMRDA's decision. The Bombay High Court ruled in favour of the MMRDA and dismissed all petitions against the Metro 2B project.

=== Cancelled stations ===
Two metro stations (MMRDA Station and Kurla Terminus) that were originally proposed for Metro 2B were cancelled. The MMRDA Station was cancelled because it overlapped with the Kalanagar flyover ramp. The Kurla Terminus station was cancelled in September 2020 because it was in the path of the restricted funnel zone for Mumbai Airport. Further, the proposed SG Barve Marg station was only 474 metres away from the proposed Kurla Terminus. Another issue was that the Kurla Terminus station would have been located between the Santa Cruz–Chembur Link Road (SCLR) rail overbridge and another permanent structure.

=== Depot and Line 7 link ===
Line 7 of the Mumbai Metro connects Dahisar East with Andheri East, and the depot for the line was proposed to be located at Dahisar. However, land acquisition for the Dahisar depot was delayed by litigation filed in 2016. In 2020, the MMRDA proposed using the depot at Charkop to serve both Line 2A and Line 7 by building a ring metro line to connect the two corridors. The MMRDA utilized an empty plot of land located after Ovaripada station on Line 7 to build pillars for the link connecting the two lines. In November 2021, the MMRDA cancelled the plan to build the depot at Dahisar and instead proposed building the depot for Lines 7, 7A and 9 at Rai Murdhe in Bhayandar.

Line 2A and Line 7 were both commissioned on 2 April 2022, with services operating between Dahanukarwadi and Aarey via Dahisar East. Both lines were extended on 19 January 2023, providing circular service between Andheri West and Gundavali via Dahisar East. The Charkop depot currently serves as the depot for Line 2A and Line 7. The Mandale depot will be used to serve Lines 2A and 2B once completed.

== Construction ==
Yellow Line (Line 2) will be built in two sections - Dahisar-DN Nagar (Metro 2A) and DN Nagar-Mankhurd (Metro 2B). The MMRDA signed an agreement with the DMRC, appointing the latter as the implementing agency for the project on 12 December 2015. The DMRC was paid ₹334 crore (US$35 million) for its services. The DMRC will have sole responsibility for civil and technical works, and operations and maintenance on the Metro 2A corridor. For the Metro 2B corridor, the MMRDA will carry out civil works, while the DMRC is tasked with technical work and operations and maintenance. In July 2018, the state government granted special planning authority status to the MMRDA in a bid to speed up implementation of metro projects.

=== Metro 2A ===
Metro 2A is 18.589 km (11.551 mi) long and connects Dahisar East to DN Nagar with 17 stations. Prime Minister Narendra Modi laid the foundation stone station for Metro 2A on 11 October 2015. The DMRC floated two tenders for the designing and construction of the corridor. The first package included the design and construction of a viaduct and 9 stations from Dahisar East to Dahanukarwadi, and the second package included the remaining viaduct and 8 stations from Valnai to Andheri West. J Kumar Infra Projects Limited was awarded both packages in June 2016, and carried out civil work, including viaducts and stations. The cost of the contract was ₹1,300 crore (US$130 million), with J Kumar Infra bidding below the reserve price.

Soil testing work along the corridor commenced in July 2016. Construction on the corridor began in November 2016. The corridor was scheduled to be commissioned in October 2019, but delays in procuring rolling stock and issues with civil works pushed the deadline to December 2020. The opening of the line was further delayed by the COVID-19 pandemic. As of 13 September 2017, 77% of the soil investigation work for pier foundation, 76% of barricading work, 37% of piles, and 19% of pile caps were completed, and 110 piers were cast, 75 pier caps erected, 26 U girders erected and work pile foundation work commenced for all 17 stations. In April 2019, the MMRDA issued tenders for the rooftop solar PV power projects at stations on Metro 2A. Track laying work on the line began in June 2019.

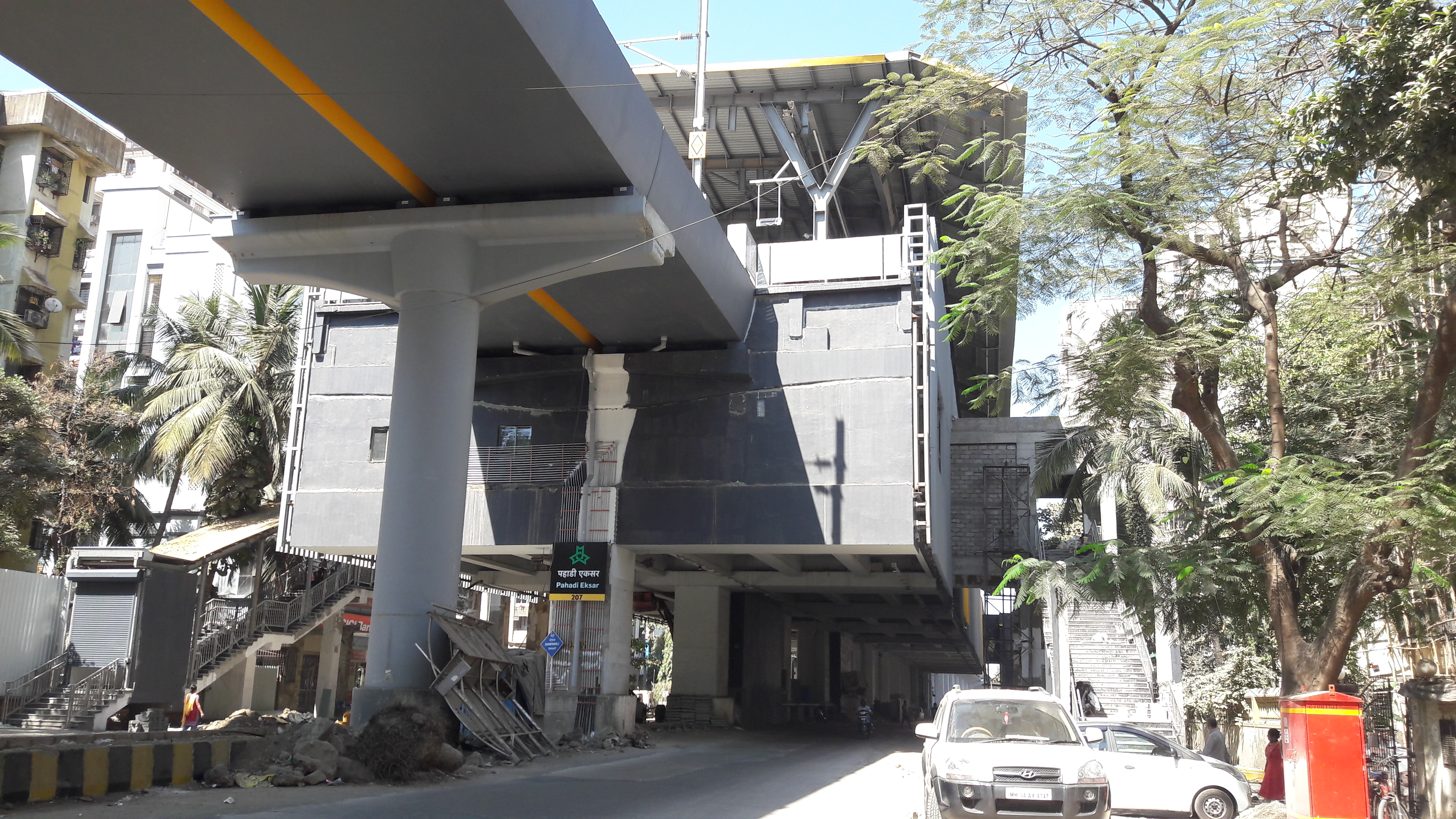
Shimpoli station under construction in Borivali in 2022

The stations on the line have a platform length of 185 metres (607 ft) to serve 8-car rakes. Stations were built on a single pier, unlike the three piers used to support stations on Line 1. The single-pier design was chosen due to the lack of space available for construction on New Link Road. Unlike most metros in India, the stations were not completely constructed on site. Construction utilized "pi-girders", which were pre-cast at a casting yard in Bandra. The girders were then erected onto the station for platforms. Most of the spans on the line have a length of 25–28 metres (82–92 ft). A 51-metre (167 ft) long steel girder was installed on New Link Road in Kandivali to accommodate a 700-metre (2,300 ft) radius curve along the line.

MMRDA metropolitan commissioner R.A. Rajeev stated in September 2020 that almost 80% of construction work had been completed. The MMRDA began conducting pre-trials on the rolling stock at the Charkop depot in February 2021. The MMRDA announced that the electrification of the line had been completed on 26 May, and the first trial runs were conducted from 31 May. The MMRDA began a dynamic test and trial run on the 20 km (12 mi) stretch between Dhanukarwadi and Aarey (including a portion of Line 7) on 19 June. The final I-girder on Line 2A was launched at Adarsh Nagar Junction in Andheri on 6 October 2021. The stretch between Dhanukarwadi and Aarey received provisional approval from the Research Designs and Standards Organisation (RDSO) in January 2022. The Commissioner of Metro Rail Safety (CMRS) began inspecting the line in February 2022.

A section of Metro 2A from Dhanukarwadi to Dahisar East (along with the section of Line 7 from Dahisar East to Aarey) was opened on 2 April 2022. Chief Minister Uddhav Thackeray flagged off the first train at 4pm in the presence of Deputy Chief Minister Ajit Pawar, Urban Development Minister Eknath Shinde, NCP chief Sharad Pawar, and the Leader of Opposition in the Legislative Council, Pravin Darekar. The line opened for public service from 8pm, with services operating between Dahanukarwadi and Aarey (on Line 7) via Dahisar East.

The remaining section of Metro 2A from Dhanukarwadi to DN Nagar received approval from the RDSO in October 2022. The CMRS began inspecting the line in December 2022. The final section of the line (along with the final section of Line 7 from Goregaon East to Gundavali) was inaugurated on 19 January 2023, by Prime Minister Narendra Modi.

=== Metro 2B ===
Metro 2B is 23.643 km (14.691 mi) long and connects DN Nagar to Mankhurd with 20 stations. The foundation stone for Metro 2B was laid by Prime Minister Narendra Modi on 24 December 2016. The MMRDA utilized a drone to carry out survey work for Metro 2B. The drones were fitted with a 360-degree camera that provides up to 3-millimeter accuracy. The aerial survey takes less time than a regular survey, achieves greater accuracy and helps protect against false claims for compensation. The MMRDA invited bids for civil work on Metro 2B on 4 January 2017. Metro 2B was divided into four packages - ESIC Nagar to Khira Nagar, Saraswat Nagar to ILFS, MTNL Metro to Chembur, and Diamond Garden to Mandale. Metro 2B was tendered alongside Metro 4. L&T, Afcons Infrastructure, Tata, NCC and JMC, Reliance Infrastructure-RdE, JKumar Group, ITD Cementation, CHEC-TPL bid for packages on both Metro 2B and Metro 4. Simplex Infrastructure and a consortium of GHEC-RCC-JV-China placed bids only for some packages of Metro 2B. A total of 10 firms and/or consortia submitted bids for the two lines. The MMRDA shortlisted 8 bidders for the contract to build the Mandale depot in November 2017.

Simplex Infrastructure was awarded a ₹1,080 crore (US$110 million) contract to build the first package of Metro 2B by the MMRDA on 13 November 2017. This included the design and construction of a 12 km long viaduct and 11 elevated stations including ESIC Nagar, Prem Nagar, Indira Nagar, Old Airport, Khira Nagar, Saraswat Nagar, National College, Bandra (W), MMRDA Office, Income Tax Office, and BKC. A joint venture between RCC Infra Ventures and MBZ-Ukraine was awarded a ₹521 crore (US$54 million) contract for the second package on 3 March 2018. This included the design and construction of a 5.9 km long elevated viaduct, the Mandale car depot, and 6 metro stations including MTNL Metro, SG Barve Marg, Kurla Terminus, Kurla East, and Chembur. Construction began in April 2018. In March 2019, the MMRDA altered the alignment of the proposed route at BKC Road to avoid it passing in front of Shiv Sena president Uddhav Thackeray's residence.

On 4 February 2020, the MMRDA terminated the contract awarded to Simplex Infrastructure and the RCC-MBZ joint venture over the delay in completing the work. Simplex had completed 5% of the total work in 30 months, while it was scheduled to have completed 65%. RCC-MBZ had only completed 4.46% of total work. The MMRDA awarded a ₹1,307.88 crore (US$140 million) to J Kumar Infraprojects to complete work on the first package in June 2021, and a ₹760 crore (US$79 million) contract to Nagarjuna Construction Company to complete work on the second package of Metro 2B in March 2022. Construction resumed in March 2023. The MMRDA stated that 70% of work on the Mandale depot had been completed by the end of May 2023.

=== Current status ===
==== Metro 2B ====
Sr. no.	Name of work	Description	Status as of									
Sr. no.	Name of work	Description	21 May 2019	22 November 2019	4 August 2020	15 September 2020	5 October 2020	4 January 2021	2 August 2021	27 January 2022	5 September 2022	25 September 2023
1	Soil investigation works	Soil investigation work for pier foundation completed	55%	59.08%	68.60%	70.60%		72.86%	74.29%	82.86%	90.57%	100.00%
2	Utility works	Work completed	23%	28.86%	40.22%	45.07%		45.25%	46.46%	57.21%	65.21%	94.31%
3	Piling works	Piling work for foundations completed	7%	8.84%	23.15%	25.10%	26.62%	28.20%	33.95%	38.08%	49.46%	80.88%
4	Pile cap works	Pile cap work completed	3%	4.08%	12.1%	12.4%	12.93%	16.15%	20.67%	30.96%	37.28%	79.18%
5	Pier works	Piers cast	1.2%	1.45%	5.95%	6.73%		6.94%	14.25%	23.46%	33.31%	63.48%
6	Pier cap works	Casting	Casting beds are under preparation.		3.12%	3.92%		5.52%	6.60%	12.91%	24.36%	68.09%
6	Pier cap works	Erection	Casting beds are under preparation.		1.88%	2.33%		2.39%	5.14%	10.85%	21.27%	59.47%
7	U girder works	Casting	0.7%	0.8%	6.22%	7.84%		7.91%	10.79%	11.96%	34.48%	58.08%
7	U girder works	Erection	Casting yard works are in progress		1.40%	1.64%		1.98%	3.93%	7.7%	20.69%	40.00%
8	Station work	Work is in progress at some of the 22 stations.	Yet to start	Soil investigation and utility identification work is in progress. Foundation work yet to start.	Foundation (pile and pile cap) work is in progress at 5 stations. Substructure work yet to start.	Foundation (pile and pile cap) work is in progress at 5 stations.						
9	Mandale depot works	Work completed				7.00%			11.15%	21.22%	40.06%	80.72%

== Stations ==
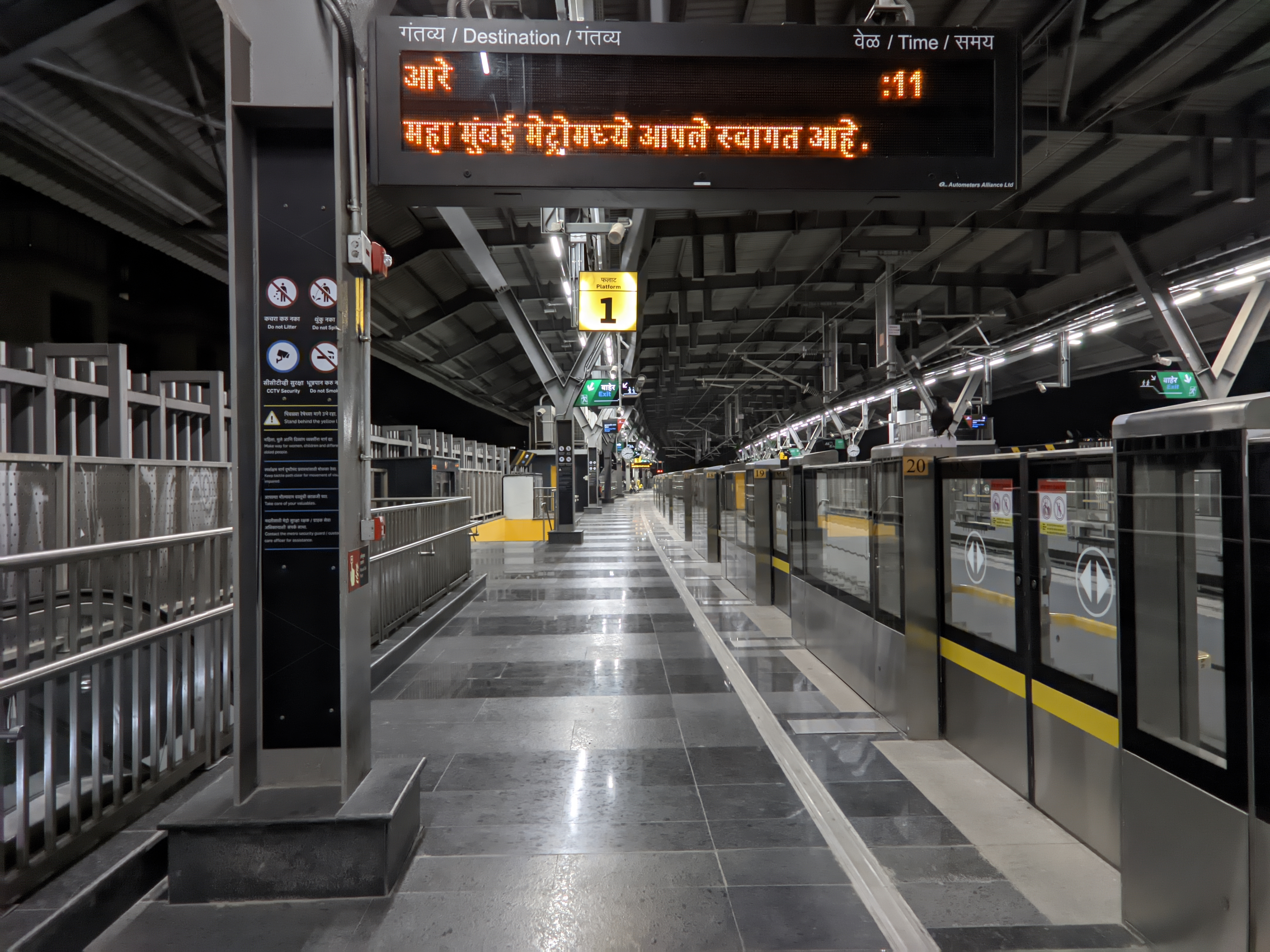
Passenger information display and platform screen doors at Kandarpada station

There will be a total of 37 stations on Line 2. Metro 2A, from Dahisar to Andheri (West), has 17 stations. Metro 2B, from Andheri (West) to Mankhurd, will have 20 stations. The MMRDA partnered with the bike-sharing app MBYK to provide a bicycle-sharing service at stations on the line.

Yellow Line
#	Station		Interchange	Opened	Alignment
#	English	Marathi	Interchange	Opened	Alignment
Line 2A
1	Dahisar (East)	दहिसर (पूर्व)	Line 7	2 April 2022	Elevated
2	Anand Nagar	आनंद नगर		2 April 2022	Elevated
3	Kandarpada	कांदरपाडा		2 April 2022	Elevated
4	Mandapeshwar	मंडपेश्वर		2 April 2022	Elevated
5	Eksar	एकसर		2 April 2022	Elevated
6	Borivali (West)	बोरीवली (पश्चिम)		2 April 2022	Elevated
7	Shimpoli	शिंपोली		2 April 2022	Elevated
8	Kandivli (West)	कांदिवली (पश्चिम)		2 April 2022	Elevated
9	Dahanukarwadi	डहाणूकरवाडी		2 April 2022	Elevated
10	Valnai–Meeth Chowky	वळनई–मीठ चौकी		19 January 2023	Elevated
11	Malad (West)	मालाड (पश्चिम)		19 January 2023	Elevated
12	Lower Malad	लोअर मालाड		19 January 2023	Elevated
13	Bangur Nagar	बांगूर नगर		19 January 2023	Elevated
14	Goregaon (West)	गोरेगाव (पश्चिम)		19 January 2023	Elevated
15	Oshiwara	ओशिवरा		19 January 2023	Elevated
16	Lower Oshiwara	लोअर ओशिवरा	Line 6 Adarsh Nagar (under construction)	19 January 2023	Elevated
17	Andheri (West)	अंधेरी (पश्चिम)	Line 1 D N Nagar	19 January 2023	Elevated
Line 2B
18	Hare Ram Hare Krishna Mandir - Juhu	हरे राम हरे कृष्ण मंदिर - जुहू		December 2026	Elevated
19	Prem Nagar	प्रेम नगर		December 2026	Elevated
20	Indira Nagar (Vile Parle)	इंदिरा नगर (विलेपार्ले)		December 2026	Elevated
21	Nanavati Hospital	नानावटी रुग्णालय		December 2026	Elevated
22	Khira Nagar	खिरा नगर	Western	December 2026	Elevated
23	Saraswat Nagar	सारस्वत नगर		December 2026	Elevated
24	Bandra	वांद्रे	Western	December 2027	Elevated
25	Income Tax Office	आयकर कार्यालय	Line 3 Bandra Kurla Complex; Bandra Kurla Complex HSR (under construction)	December 2027	Elevated
26	ILFS	आयएलएफएस		December 2027	Elevated
27	MTNL	एमटीएनएल		December 2027	Elevated
28	SG Barve Marg	एसजी बर्वे मार्ग	Line 8 (proposed)	December 2027	Elevated
29	Kurla (East)	कुर्ला (पूर्व)		December 2027	Elevated
30	Eastern Express Highway	पूर्व द्रुतगती महामार्ग	Line 4 Siddharth Colony (under construction)	December 2027	Elevated
31	Chembur	चेंबूर	VNP and RC Marg Junction	13 August 2026	Elevated
32	Deshbhakt N.G. Acharya Udyan-Diamond Garden, Chembur	देशभक्त ना.ग.आचार्य उद्यान-डायमंड गार्डन, चेंबूर		8 April 2026	Elevated
33	Chhatrapati Shivaji Maharaj Chowk (Chembur)	छत्रपति शिवाजी महाराज चौक (चेंबूर)		8 April 2026	Elevated
34	Deonar	देवनार		8 April 2026	Elevated
35	Mankhurd	मानखुर्द	Harbour; Gold Line (proposed)	8 April 2026	Elevated
36	Maharashtranagar Mandale	महाराष्ट्रनगर मंडाळे		8 April 2026	Elevated

== Cost ==
Metro 2A was built at a cost of ₹6,410 crore (US$670 million). The line was originally scheduled to open in October 2019 but was delayed, and completed in January 2023. The MMRDA stated that the delay escalated the project cost by about 7%. The State Government bore 48% of the total project cost. The MMRDA secured a loan worth 52% of the total project cost from the Asian Development Bank (ADB). The MMRDA allotted ₹340 crore (US$35 million) to the DMRC to implement and commission rolling stock, signalling, and telecommunication work for the Metro 2A and Line 7 corridors on 26 November 2016.

Metro 2B is estimated to cost ₹10,986 crore, including the land acquisition cost of ₹1,274 crore. Half of the project cost will be funded by the Centre and the State Government, while the remaining will be financed through loans from the Asian Development Bank and the World Bank.

On 2 March 2019, the Union Ministry of Finance stated that it signed a $926 million loan agreement with the ADB to fund the construction of Lines 2 and 7. This was the single largest infrastructure loan ever extended by the ADB. The funds will be used to procure 63 six-car trainsets and for signalling and safety systems on both corridors.

== Infrastructure ==
=== Rolling stock ===
BEML was awarded a ₹3,015 crore (US$310 million) contract to supply 378 metro cars (63 trainsets) for Yellow Line and Line 7 in November 2018. Six other manufacturers of rolling stock—Alstom, Bombardier (acquired by Alstom in 2021), CAF, CRRC, Titagarh Rail Systems, and Hyundai Rotem—participated in the bid. An additional 126 metro cars (21 trainsets) were ordered from BEML to cater to metro extensions. All trainsets were manufactured at BEML's Rail Coach Factory in Bangalore, Karnataka. The rakes are capable of driverless operation, making them the first driverless metro trains to be made in India. BEML began manufacturing the coaches on 29 July 2019, built the first metro coach in 75 days, and unveiled it in September 2019. The first trainset arrived in Mumbai on 28 January 2021.

Each trainset is made up of 6 coaches with a total passenger capacity of 1,660 and dense crush load capacity of 2,092. The trainset is 3.2 metres wide, made of stainless steel and each coach has 4 doors on each side. It employs a regenerative braking system.

=== Depot ===
The Charkop depot currently serves as the depot for Line 2A and Line 7. It is located on a 16.40 hectare site, and has 20 stabling lines. The depot had 305 employees of which 30% were women (as of October 2022).

The depot for the Yellow Line is proposed to be located on a 28 hectare site at Mandale, and is the largest metro depot in Mumbai. It has a double decker structure with 76 stabling lines. It is currently under construction and will serve Line 2A and 2B once completed.

=== Signalling ===
Yellow Line utilises the Alstom Urbalis 400 communications-based train control (CBTC) signalling system. Alstom was awarded a EUR90 million contract to supply the signalling and telecommunications systems for Mumbai Metro Yellow Lineand Line 7, as well as Pune Metro Line 1 and Line 7.

=== Power ===
The Yellow Line is electrified at 25 kV 50 Hz AC, with power provided via an overhead catenary. The MMRDA signed an agreement with Adani Electricity Mumbai Limited to supply electricity to Metro 2A and Metro 7 on 2 December 2022. Around 120 million units is required to power both lines.

=== Fare collection ===
A consortium of Indian company Datamatics and Italian company AEP Ticketing solutions S.R.L was awarded a ₹160 crore (US$17 million) contract to implement the automated fare collection system for Yellow Line and Line 7 in February 2019.
