= Andheri West metro station =

Mumbai Metro's Yellow Line 2A terminal metro station

Andheri (West)
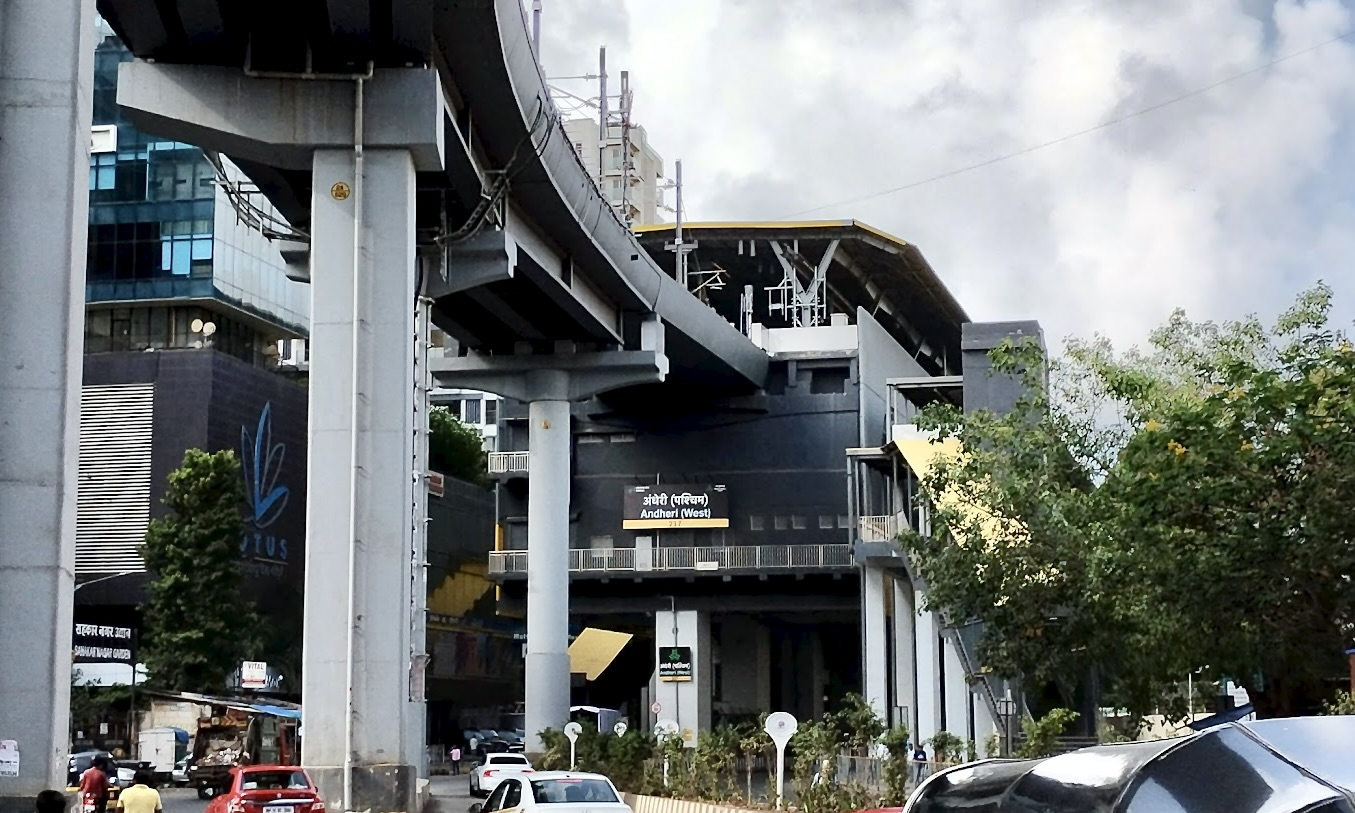
- Andheri (West) metro station as seen from New Link Rd

General information
- Location: Sahakar Nagar, Azad Nagar, Andheri West, Mumbai, Maharashtra 400053
- Coordinates: 19°07′45″N 72°49′53″E
- Owner: Mumbai Metropolitan Region Development Authority
- Operator: Maha Mumbai Metro Operation Corporation Ltd.
- Line: 2A-Yellow Line
- Platforms: 2 side platforms
- Connections: Blue Line at D N Nagar

Construction
- Structure type: Elevated
- Parking: No

Other information
- Station code: 217

History
- Opened: 19 January 2023; 3 years ago

Passengers
- 2023: 18,500 daily

Services
Preceding station	Mumbai Metro	Following station
Terminus	2A-Yellow Line	Lower Oshiwara towards Dahisar (East)
Route map
Yellow Line
Location

Andheri (West) is the elevated southern terminal station on the north–south corridor of the Yellow Line 2A of the Mumbai Metro in Mumbai, India. This station is located in Andheri, Mumbai. This station is owned by the Mumbai Metropolitan Region Development Authority (MMRDA), and was inaugurated on 19 January 2023.

== History ==
It was opened to the public on 19 January 2023, along with the second phase of Line 2A.

== Station layout ==
2nd Floor	Side platform
2nd Floor	Platform 1	towards Dahisar (East) (Lower Oshiwara) →
2nd Floor	Platform 2	Alighting only
2nd Floor	Side platform
1st Floor	Mezzanine	Fare control, station agent, Metro QR ticket vending machines, crossover, walkway to 1
Ground	Street level	Exit/Entrance

=== Power and signaling system ===
Like all other stations and railways of Mumbai metro, Andheri West station also uses 25,000 volt AC power system by overhead catenary to operate the trains.
