= National Highway 24 (India) =

National highway in India

National Highway 24
- Map of National Highway 24 in red
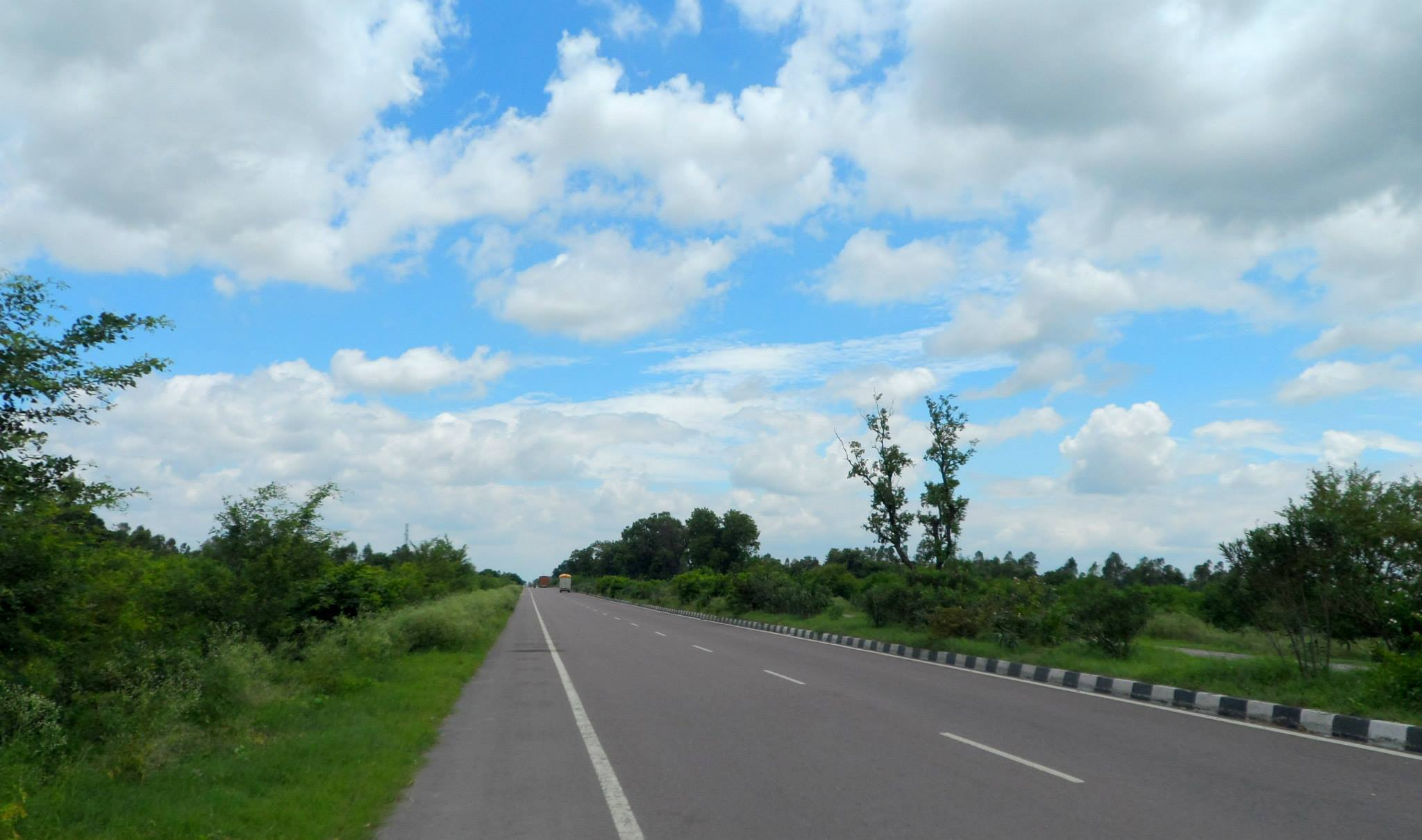

Route information
- Length: 293 km (182 mi)

Major junctions
- North end: NH47 in Sonauli, Uttar Pradesh
- List: NH 730 in Anand Nagar, Uttar Pradesh; NH 328 in Campierganj, Uttar Pradesh; NH 27 in Gorakhpur, Uttar Pradesh; NH 227A in Barhalganj, Uttar Pradesh; NH 128C in Dohrighat, Uttar Pradesh; NH 128B in Aurangabad, Uttar Pradesh; NH 124D in Kansahri, Uttar Pradesh; NH 31 in Ghazipur, Uttar Pradesh; NH 124C in Medinpur, Uttar Pradesh
- South end: NH 19 in Saiyad Raja, Uttar Pradesh

Location
- Country: India
- States: Uttar Pradesh

Highway system
- Roads in India; Expressways; National; State; Asian
← NH 23	→ NH 25

National Highway 24 (NH 24) is a primary national highway in India, running in a north–south direction. This highway runs entirely in the state of Uttar Pradesh. This highway was created by renumbering former NH29 and NH97 as per the new numbering system of national highways.

== Route ==
NH24 connects Sonauli (Indo/Nepal border), Nautanwa, Kolhui, Pharenda, Campierganj, Rawatganj, Gorakhpur, Bhaurapur, Kauriram, Barhalganj, Doharighat, Ghosi, Mau, Mardah, Ghazipur, Zamania and Saiyad Raja in the state of Uttar Pradesh.

== See also ==
- List of national highways in India
- List of national highways in India by state
