= National Highway 328 (India) =

National Highway in India

National Highway 328

Route information
- Auxiliary route of NH 28
- Length: 92 km (57 mi)

Major junctions
- West end: Basti
- East end: Partawal (Kaptanganj)

Location
- Country: India
- States: Uttar Pradesh

Highway system
- Roads in India; Expressways; National; State; Asian
← NH 28	→ NH 730

National Highway 328, commonly referred to as NH 328 is a national highway in India. It is a secondary route of National Highway 28. NH-328 runs in the state of Uttar Pradesh in India.

== Route ==
NH328 connects Basti, Mehdawal, Karmaini, Campierganj and Partawal(Kaptanganj) in the state of Uttar Pradesh.

== Junctions ==
NH 28 Terminal near Basti.
NH 328A near Mehdawal
NH 24 near Campierganj
NH 730 Terminal near Partawal(Kaptanganj).

== See also ==
- List of national highways in India
- List of national highways in India by state
