= Gaban =

Gaban (lit. 'embezzle, swindle') may refer to:

- Gaban (novel), a 1931 Hindi-language novel by Indian writer Munshi Premchand
  - Gaban (film), a 1966 Indian Hindi-language film adaptation of the novel

== See also ==
- Scopper Gaban, fictional character in One Piece
- Space Sheriff Gavan, a Japanese Tokusatsu series, translated as Gaban in Indonesia and Malaysia
