= Anand Nagar metro station =

Anand Nagar metro station may refer to:

- Anand Nagar metro station (Mumbai), also known as Upper Dahisar, on the Yellow Line of Mumbai Metro, India
- Anand Nagar metro station (Pune), on the Aqua Line of Pune Metro, India

== See also ==
- Anand Nagar, a city in Assam, India
- Anand Nagar Junction railway station, Uttar Pradesh, India
