= National Highway 328A (India) =

National Highway in India

National Highway 328A

Route information
- Auxiliary route of NH 28
- Length: 98 km (61 mi)

Major junctions
- North end: Mehdawal
- South end: Nyori

Location
- Country: India
- States: Uttar Pradesh

Highway system
- Roads in India; Expressways; National; State; Asian
← NH 328	→ NH 28

National Highway 328A, commonly referred to as NH 328A is a national highway in India. It is a secondary route of National Highway 28. NH-328A runs in the state of Uttar Pradesh in India.

== Route ==
NH328A connects Mehdawal, Khalilabad, Ghanghata, Ramnagar and Nyori in the state of Uttar Pradesh.

== Junctions ==
NH 328 Terminal near Mehdawal.
NH 27 near Khalilabad
NH 227A near Gagar Garh
NH 28 Terminal near Nyori.

== See also ==
- List of national highways in India
- List of national highways in India by state
