= Lottery (disambiguation) =

A lottery is a form of gambling which involves the drawing of lots for a prize. In decision theory, a lottery is used as a generic term for any situation involving an uncertain outcome.

Lottery may also refer to:

== Arts and entertainment ==
=== Publications ===
- "The Lottery", a 1948 short story by Shirley Jackson
- Lottery (novel), a novel by Patricia Wood
- Lottery (short story), a 1933 short story by Munshi Premchand
- The Lottery (novel), a 2002 novel by Beth Goobie

=== Plays ===
- The Lottery (play), a play by Henry Fielding

=== Films and television ===
- The Lottery, a 1969 film based on the short story "The Lottery"
- The Lottery, a 1996 TV film based on the short story "The Lottery"
- The Lottery (1989 film), an American comedy short film
- Lottery (2009 film), a Bollywood romance thriller film
- The Lottery (2010 film), an American documentary film
- Lottery (2018 film), an Iranian romance film
- The Lottery (TV series), a 2014 drama television series
- Lottery! (1983–1984), an American television show

=== Music ===
- Lottery (Kali Uchis song), 2015
- Lottery (K Camp song), 2019
- Lottery (Latto song), 2023
- "Lottery", a 2007 song by Chris Brown from Exclusive

== Sports ==
- Lottery (horse, foaled 1820)
- Lottery (Grand National winner), a 19th-century champion racehorse
- NBA draft lottery, a lottery used to determine the draft order in the National Basketball Association
- NHL draft lottery, a lottery used to determine the draft order in the National Hockey League

== Other uses ==
- Lottery (probability), a concept used in expected utility theory
- Lottery voting, an electorate system
- Mountain Road Lottery, a lottery sponsored by George Washington in 1768
- Postcode lottery, a phrase used in the United Kingdom to describe the differences in services depending on geographic location
- Cleromancy, divination by lot

== See also ==
- National lottery (disambiguation)
- Lotería, a Mexican game resembling bingo
- Silesian Lottery, a gambling card game
