= Amrit Rai =

Indian writer (1921–1996)

- Born: 3 September 1921; Lamhi, Banaras State, British India
- Died: 14 August 1996 (aged 74); Allahabad
- Occupation: Writer
- Relatives: Munshi Premchand (father)
- Writing career
- Language: Hindi, Urdu

Amrit Rai (3 September 1921 – 14 August 1996) was an Indian writer, poet and biographer in both the Hindi and Urdu styles of the Hindustani language. He is the son of Munshi Premchand, a pioneer of modern Urdu literature and of Hindi literature. A prolific writer, Rai made his literary debut with novel Beej in 1952 and went on to write an acclaimed biography of his father, Premchand, Kalam ka Sipahi (1962), which later won him the Sahitya Akademi award for 1963.

== Career ==
Rai co-edited Chitthi Patri (1962), a two-volume book on the letters of Premchand along with his biographer, Madan Gopal. In 1982, he donated a collection of his father's 236 letters to the Nehru Memorial Museum and Library (NMML) at Teen Murti House, Delhi. His A House Divided is an influential account of how the shared Hindi/Hindavī linguistic tradition became differentiated into Modern Standard Hindi and Urdu.

== Death ==
Rai died in Allahabad, in August 1996 at the age of 75. He had suffered a paralytic stroke earlier in March.

== Bibliography ==
- Rai, Amrit. Premchand: A Life. Harish Trivedi, translator. New Delhi: People's Publishing House, 1982.
- Rai, Amrit. A House Divided: The Origin and Development of Hindi/Hindavi. Delhi: Oxford University Press, 1984.
