= NH 28 =

NH 28 may refer to:

- National Highway 28 (India)
- New Hampshire Route 28, United States
