= Lamahi =

Lamahi may refer to:

- Lamhi, a village in Uttar Pradesh, India
- Lamahi Municipality, a municipality in southwestern Nepal
