= Nirmala (novel) =

1926 Hindi novel by Munshi Premchand

Nirmala (The Second Wife)
- Nirmala novel cover
- Author: Munshi Premchand
- Original title: Nirmala
- Translator: Alok Rai and David Rubin
- Cover artist: Orient Paperbacks (Alok Rai); Oxford India Paperbacks (David Rubin)
- Language: Hindi
- Genre: Fiction
- Published: January 1927
- Publication place: India
- ISBN: 978-0-19-565826-2 (translated version by Oxford India)
- Original text: Nirmala at Hindi Wikisource

Nirmala (Note: Though "nirmala" (Hindi: निर्मला) means "virtuous" or "pure", David Rubin, the first translator, titled it as The Second Wife.) is a Hindi novel written by Indian writer Munshi Premchand. The novel is centered on Nirmala, a young girl who was forced to marry a widower of her father's age. The plot unfolds to reveal her husband's suspicion of a relationship between her and his eldest son, a suspicion that leads to the son's death.

A poignant novel first published between 1925 and 1926, Nirmala's reformist agenda is transparent in its theme which deals with the question of dowry, and consequently mismatched marriages and related issues. The story uses fiction to highlight an era of much needed social reform in 1920s Indian society. Nirmala was serialised in Chand, a women's magazine in which the novel's feminist character was represented. Nirmala is somewhat like Godaan (published in 1936) in that it deals with the exploitation of the village poor, and Nandita (2016) in similarities of being shackled by society's narrow expectations of how a woman should be. Nirmala was translated by multiple scholarly translators. It was first translated in 1988 as The Second Wife by David Rubin, and in 1999 as Nirmala by Alok Rai, Premchand's grandson.

== Plot ==
Udayabhanu Lal, a lawyer, arranged to marry off his 15-year-old daughter Nirmala to Bhuvanmohan Sinha, son of Bhalchadra Sinha. Kalyani, Nirmala's mother advises Lal not to spend too much money on Nirmala's marriage as he also has the duty of getting her second daughter, Krishna married. Angered by Kalyani's words, he decides to teach her a lesson by leaving his old dresses along the riverbank and going out to the next village for sometime to make Kalyani believe that he is dead. Lal was later murdered by his rival Mathayi, who was once tried in court by Lal and sentenced to jail. The death of Lal caused the Sinhas to withdraw from the arranged marriage since there was no longer a large dowry as anticipated prior to Lal's death. Kalyani writes a letter to Rangili bai, Bhuvanmohan sinha's mother telling about her pitiful situation. Rangili bai's effort of making her husband and son understand ends up in vain. With the help of Pandit Motaram, Kalyani searches a groom for Nirmala. Financial hardship forced Nirmala's mother, Kalyani, to marry her off to Totaram, a lawyer 20 years her senior. Totaram tried his best to seduce his beautiful young wife but to no avail. He once tells a false story that he killed two thieves who had big swords with them to make her feel that her husband is full of bravery. But Nirmala who knows that it is a false story, still smiles and acts as though she is happy. She had no feelings for him other than respect and a sense of duty, which fell short of the love he expected to receive from his wife.

Totaram had three sons from his first marriage. His eldest son Mansaram was only a year older than Nirmala. It was not long before Totaram grew suspicious of Nirmala due to his widow sister, Rukmini's words and her relationship with his son Mansaram. Jealousy and suspicion caused him to send Mansaram away to live in a hostel, a decision they all soon came to regret. Mansaram's health soon deteriorated in the hostel environment. It was Bhuvanmohan who treated Mansaram at the hospital. When Mansaram was in need of blood it was Nirmala who donated her blood after which Totaram realises his mistake. Bhuvanmohan learned about Nirmala, he arranged for his brother to marry Nirmala's sister, Krishna, as penance. Bhuvanmohan was haunted by his thoughts of Nirmala and her distress. Mansaram eventually died of tuberculosis.

Totaram was heartbroken and guilt ridden over his role in his son's death. Rukmini fuels the fire in Jiyaram and Siyaram that Nirmala was the reason for their brother's death. They believe in Rukmini's false words. It was not long thereafter when his second son, Jiyaram absconded with Nirmala's jewels and fled from Totaram's house. He later committed suicide. Totaram's third son Siyaram also fled, having been lured away by a false saint. Depressed over the loss of his sons, Totaram set off on a mission to find his only living son, Siyaram.

Meanwhile, Bhuvanmohan was back in Nirmala's life as the husband of her friend, Sudha. He tried to seduce Nirmala, but his wife learned of it and criticised him harshly. Bhuvanmohan became emotionally distressed, and out of sorrow and his love for her, he committed suicide. Depressed by the sad turn of events and her own failing health, Nirmala gave her daughter Asha to Rukhmini and died. A much older Totaram returned home to discover Nirmala had died. Rukmini realised her mistake.

== Characters ==
- Nirmala the protagonist; a 15-year-old girl, married off to Totaram who is 20 years her senior.
- Totaram Nirmala's husband, a lawyer of 35.
- Mansaram Totaram's eldest son from his first wife; suspected of having a relationship with Nirmala, and forces him out of the house to live in a hostel where he eventually dies.
- Jiyaram Totaram's second son from his first wife; he blames his father for the death of his older brother and flees from home after absconding with Nirmala's jewelry. He eventually commits suicide.
- Siyaram Totaram's third son from his first wife; he is lured away from his father's house by a false saint.
- Asha Totaram and Nirmala's daughter.
- Rukhmini Totaram's widowed sister.
- Udayabhanu Lal Nirmala's father.
- Kalyani Nirmala's mother.
- Krishna Nirmala's younger sister.
- Bhuvanmohan Sinha former fiancé of Nirmala. After the death of Nirmala's father, he learns there will not be a dowry and withdraws from the marriage.
- Sudha Bhuvanmohan's wife and the companion of Nirmala.
- Bhalchandra Sinha father of Bhuvanmohan Sinha.
- Rangili bai Bhalchandra sinha's wife and Bhuvanmohan sinha's mother.
- Pandit Motaram a wise priest.
- Bhungi maid in Totaram's house.
- Saros Nirmala Sister
- Sooraj Nirmala's Lover
- Samay Nirmala's uncle

== Background ==
Set against a background of pre–independent India, Nirmala depicts a realistic and picturesque portrait of the 1920s, the language and milieu of the era. It characterises the evils of the dowry system, and in doing so reflects the author's desire to bring about social reform and raise the status of women in society. The author's words illustrate his country's poor, and paints a picture of rural India consisting largely of a static society, the clashes of castes, its poverty and exploitation, and the rich character of its people. The novel covers a time span of about six years during which time Nirmala transitions from student to wife and thereafter, a mother. It was an era when self-respect and public image were of fundamental importance in the society. Eating meals was observed with an extreme ritualistic importance. In traditional homes, women did not eat with the men, and waited for them to finish before they were permitted to eat. There was also a fear of hospitals [and also of blood transfusion] which explains the hesitation of the character Totaram and his guilt over sending his son to a hospital. The generations that have passed since the novel was first written have seen dramatic changes in "attitude, sensibility and aspiration". Nirmala is a reflection of a time in Indian society when a young girl's "greatest sin was to require a husband who would accept her without a dowry".

== Publication ==
[Nirmala is] a tale of woman's tragedy [...] — which nevertheless rises above the usual limitations of a roman a these in its dramatisation of very specific and highly individualised private lives [and] makes its appeal on a basis of universal human experience that transcends any local peculiarities of customs or culture.

— David Rubin in the "Translator's Introduction" of the book

Nirmala was one of Premchand's most popular novels of its time in India, a time of oppression for women in Indian society that drew increasing attention from writers and poets. Prior to being published in its entirety, Nirmala was serialised in the magazine Chand between November 1925 and November 1926. It was during the time when Premchand first embarked on writing fiction based on contemporary social issues. Unlike his other works, Nirmala has a darker tone and ending, and its characters are less idealised. It was translated into English for the first time in 1988.

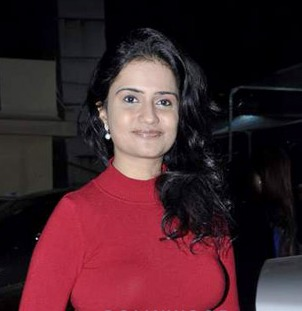
Amruta Subhash played Nirmala in Tehreer Munshi Premchand Ki by Gulzar

== Legacy ==
Francesca Orsini called it a prime example of Premchand's combination of social realism and drama. Gulzar believed the novel was a little outstretched, and had a tendency to repeat many emotions, but also had its diversions and contradictions. He further explained that Premchand specialised in subjects that revolved around a young girl under 18 years old who suddenly becomes a woman after marrying a man who is much older.

Many films based on the story's theme were also produced, such as Tehreer Munshi Premchand Ki directed by Gulzar and shown in Doordarshan. Nirmala's role was played by the Marathi actress Amruta Subhash who received many accolades.

Ananya Khare played the lead role in the Doordarshan TV serial Nirmala in 1987.
