= Kathiatali =

- town
- Location in Assam, India Kathiatali (India)
- Coordinates: 26°11′0″N 92°44′0″E
- Country: India
- State: Assam
- District: Nagaon
- Elevation: 196 m (643 ft)

Languages
  - Official: Assamese
- Time zone: UTC+5:30 (IST)
- PIN: 782427
- Vehicle registration: AS
- Coastline: 0 kilometres (0 mi)

Kathiatali is a town in Nagaon district, Assam, India. It is located at an elevation of 196 m above MSL. Kathiatali is connected by National Highway 36 which connects Nagaon of the Indian state Assam with Dimapur of the Indian state Nagaland.
