= Daya Narain Nigam =

Indian writer and poet (1882–1942)

Munshi Daya Narain Nigam
- Born: 22 March 1882; Kanpur, United Provinces, British India
- Died: 2 November 1942 (aged 60); Kanpur, United Provinces, British India
- Education: Christchurch College, Kanpur
- Occupations: Poet, Journalist, Writer
- Writing career
- Language: Urdu
- Genres: Poetry, Journalism
- Subjects: Hindu-Muslim Unity, Freedom of India
- Notable works: Zamana, Azad

Munshi Daya Narain Nigam (22 March 1882 – 2 November 1942) was an Indian Urdu poet, Journalist and writer. He was the editor and publisher of Zamana, a monthly Journal launched by Munshi Shiv Brat Lal Vermen in February 1903 from Bareilly.

He was the founder of Azad, a weekly Journal published from Kanpur. He advocated for the Hindu-Muslim Unity and the Freedom of India. He was a contemporary and friend of Munshi Premchand.

== Biography ==
Nigam was born in Kanpur, United Provinces, India on 22 March 1882 to Kanhaiya Lal Nigam, a native of Kannauj but later shifted to Kanpur. He was taught Urdu and Persian at home. He was admitted to Government High School, Kanpur in 1899 and passed with First Class. He completed his Bachelor of Arts from Christchurch College, Kanpur in 1903 and started teaching Urdu and Persian at the same college. His parents wanted him to be a Lawyer, but he joined Journalism in 1903 and worked for about 39 years.

=== Death ===
Nigam died in Kanpur on 2 November 1942.

== Literary works ==
=== Books ===
- Insaaf
- Islamyan-e-Hind
- Hindu Mat
- Khutbat-e-Sadarat
- Makateeb-e-Nigam
- Mashaheer-e-Adab urdu

=== Journals ===
- Zamana
- Azad
