= P. C. Gupta =

Indian writer and professor

Prakash Chandra Gupta
- Born: 16 March 1908; Bhakkar, Punjab, India
- Died: 10 November1970
- Other name: P. C. Gupta
- Occupations: Writer, English professor

Prakash Chandra Gupta (1908–1970) was an Indian writer, both in Hindi and English, and a professor of English.

== Early years and education ==
Gupta was born in Bhakkar, Punjab, India on 16 March 1908. After his initial years of rural education, regular schooling began in 1921. He was a scholarly boy with interests in cricket, photography and drama. He was a voracious reader of Hugo, Conan Doyle, Premchand, and Sharat Chandra. One of his classmates was A. B. Lal, who later served as a professor of Political Science at Allahabad University and finally the Vice Chancellor of the university.

Gupta finished high school in Grade A in 1925 and successfully completed the Intermediate Exam in 1927, ranking first among all students. He passed his pre exams in Sanskrit from Banaras Hindu University in 1926. His days in Banaras were spent under the guidance of Madan Mohan Malviya and with fellow students such as Ram Manohar Lohia, Rudra Dutt Bharadwaj, Janardan Jha, and Brij Lal.

He graduated with a Bachelor of Arts in 1929. He achieved first class and ranked second among all students in Allahabad University, the Oxford of India. He spent his days among many brilliant students and teachers including Dr. Amarnath Jha, Professor A. B. Lal, Professor R. N. Deb, Sri Aditya Nath Jha (Later Governor of Delhi), Harivansh Rai Bachchan, and Mahadevi Verma, who later became literary colleagues.

Under intense pressure from his father, Gupta appeared for Civil Services Exams and passed them but chose the fields of education and literature as his career instead. It was during this time that his first sketch, "Headlights", was published in the Allahabad University magazine.

== Teaching career ==
His first stint teaching English Literature was at St. John's College, Agra from 1931 to 1941. Here he taught literary greats like Dr. Narendra, Dr. Nemi Chandra Jain, and Bharat Bhushan. For a short period Gupta was co-editor of Sahityik Sandesh ("Literary Message"). During his tenure he regularly wrote articles, primarily literary criticisms, for this magazine. Some of these articles were broadcast on Delhi All India Radio.

He joined Allahabad University in 1941 and continued there until he retired in 1970. During this time, he was promoted to Professor of English Literature, and he retired as the head of the Department of English, Allahabad University. Gupta flourished in this period, producing much creative writing in English and in Hindi. He was involved in writers' groups and associations such as the Progressive Writers' Association, IPTA, The Levelers Club, and Parimal.

== Family ==
His first wife, Rameshwari Goyal, had a master's degree in English and her book in Hindi, Jeevan Ka Sapna ("Dream of Life") was published posthumously in 1937. She died in childbirth in 1935. Gupta married Sarla Goyal, the younger sister of Rameshwari, in 1939. Sarla was an independence worker during her early years and a founding member of the National Federation of Indian Women. She was a member of the Indian Delegation to the first International Women's Conference in Copenhagen and Moscow (1953). Sarla and Prakash had four children Ibha, Vibha, Neena the three daughters and a son Sanjay. Whereas the daughters pursued the career in teaching the son pursued Engineering

== Literary works ==
Writing in both Hindi and English and dabbling in creative and critical articles, Gupta published recollections, remembrances, short stories, and travel memoirs. Although he experimented with writing short stories, poetry, and plays, his forte remained sketches and literary criticism. He excelled in translation and his initial foray was in translation from English to Hindi – for example the works of Gorky and other Russian sketches and stories. During the latter part of his career, he translated Hindi articles and poetry to English with main emphasis being on the works of Premchand. His works regularly appeared in publications like Sahitya Sandesh, Hans, Naya Sahitya, Naya Path, Jyotsna, Rashtra Bhartiya, Vishwa Bhartiya, Calcutta Review, and Hindi Review.

He was a pioneer, setting the trend of writing sketches in Hindi.

== Other accomplishments ==
In 1954 he traveled to the USSR as a member of the teaching delegation touring Russian universities. In 1964 he did a radio broadcast on All India Radio, Allahabad, covering the ashes immersion of Pandit Jawaharlal Nehru, the first Prime Minister of India.

== Publications ==
- Hindi: Naya Hindi Sahitya, Rekha Chitra, Purani Smritiyan aur Naye Sketch, Adhunik Hidi Sahitya- Ek Drishti, Hindi Sahitya ki Janwadi Parampara, Sahitya Dhara, Vishakh, Rekha Chitra, AAJ Ka Hindi Sahitya, and Premchand.
- English: Studies and Sketches, The English Novelist, The Art of Galsworthy and other studies, My India, Premchand, and Literature and Society.
- Translations: Stalingrad ka Maha Yudh, Janta Ajey Hai, Paharon ki Beti ( All Russian Stories), A Handful of Wheat and other stories
- Editorial: Short Stories: A selection, An Anthology of English Prose, and Pragati
- Unpublished: Close to 150 articles in Hindi and English on diverse subjects; a complete list is not available.
