= Prema (novel) =

1907 novel by Premchand

- Author: Premchand
- Original title: प्रेमा
- Language: Hindustani
- Genre: Novel
- Publisher: Indian Press
- Publication date: 1907
- Publication place: India
- Followed by: Vardaan

Prema is a Hindi language social novel written by Indian writer Munshi Premchand. It is regarded as Premchand's first complete novel. The story is about the poor condition of widows in India. The novel supports widow remarriage. It was published in 1907 by Indian Press/Hindustan Publishing House.
