= National Highway 124C (India) =

National Highway in India

National Highway 124C

Route information
- Auxiliary route of NH 24
- Length: 55.8 km (34.7 mi)

Major junctions
- West end: Tarighat
- East end: Buxar

Location
- Country: India
- States: Uttar Pradesh, Bihar
- Primary destinations: Bara

Highway system
- Roads in India; Expressways; National; State; Asian
← NH 24	→ NH 922

National Highway 124C, commonly referred to as NH 124C is a national highway in India. It is a secondary route of National Highway 24. NH-124C runs in the states of Uttar Pradesh and Bihar in India.

== Route ==
NH124C connects Tarighat, Gahmar, Bara and Buxar in the states of Uttar Pradesh and Bihar.

== Junctions ==
NH 24 Terminal near Tarighat.
NH 922 Terminal near Buxar.

== See also ==
- List of national highways in India
- List of national highways in India by state
