= Gaban (novel) =

1931 novel by Munshi Premchand

- Gaban, cover page
- Author: Munshi Premchand
- Original title: गबन
- Translator: Christopher R. King
- Language: Hindi
- Genre: Fiction
- Set in: British Raj
- Publisher: Saraswati Press (India), Oxford University Press (US)
- Publication date: 1931
- Publication place: India
- English publication date: 2000
- Media type: Print (hardback & paperback)
- ISBN: 978-0-19-565216-1 (Eng. trans. paperback)
- Original text: गबन at Hindi Wikisource

Gaban (Hindi: ग़बन, Urdu: غبن, lit. 'embezzlement') is a Hindi novel by Munshi Premchand, published by Saraswati Press in 1931. Through this novel, he tries to show "the falling moral values among lower middle class Indian youth in the era of British India", and to what depths a person can descend to, to become a pseudo-elite, and maintain a false image as a rich person. Gaban is a cult classic satire of Premchand.

It tells the story of Ramanath, who is handsome, pleasure-seeking, boastful, and morally weak. He tries to make his wife Jalpa happy by gifting her jewelry which he can't really afford to buy with his meager salary, becomes indebted, which ultimately forces him to commit embezzlement. It is considered Premchand's best work, after Godaan.

It was adapted into a 1966 Hindi film with the same name by Hrishikesh Mukherjee.

== Summary ==
Munshi Deendayal is a higher middle class man from a village in Prayagraj. His young daughter, Jalpa, on a rainy day, purchases an artificial necklace from a peddler, and it became her favorite toy. Deendayal, once bought an expensive necklace, Chandrahaar, for her wife Manki. Tempted by it, Jalpa also demanded for the same, however, Manki assured her that the at her wedding, her in-laws will gift her Chandrahaar. Jalpa now spends time, waiting for her marriage, when she will get a Chandrahaar.

=== 7 Years Later ===
Munshi Dayanath is a worker in court with 50₹ salary, and an acquaintance of Deendayal He lives with his wife, Rameshwari and three sons, Ramanath, Gopinath and Vishwambar. His eldest son Ramanath is a handsome, but careless. He spends most of his time with his friends, playing chess or cards with them. Dayanath is upset towards his behaviour. Deendayal wants Ramanath to marry Jalpa, but Dayanath, cannot afford to marry of his son due to his weak financial condition. Nevertheless, Rameshwari, Dayanath's wife puts pressure on him to marry off his son soon, as she is eager to have her son marry, and thinks that Ramanath will become responsible after getting married. The wedding was memorable for the whole village. Dayanath and Deendayal, both spend money beyond their financial conditions, and when it was time to send the jewels to the bride, Dayanath didn't sent a Chandrahaar, as he borrowed jewelleries from a goldsmith, by giving just an advance amount of 1000₹. Jalpa pledged that she will not wear any jewel until she receives a Chandrahaar.

== Bibliography ==
- Sigi, Rekha (2006). Munshi Premchand. A.H.W. Sameer Series. Diamond. ISBN 978-81-288-1214-9.
