= Karmabhoomi =

Book by Munshi Premchand

- First English-language edition (2006)
- Author: Munshi Premchand
- Original title: Karmabhoomi
- Translator: Lalit Srivastava
- Language: Hindi
- Genre: Novel
- Publisher: Oxford University Press (US)
- Publication place: India
- Media type: Print (hardback & paperback)
- ISBN: 0-19-567641-6 (Eng. trans. paperback)
- OCLC: 63667151
- Dewey Decimal: 891.433
- LC Class: MLCS 2006/01276 (P)
- Original text: Karmabhoomi at Hindi Wikisource

Karmabhoomi (Hindi: कर्मभूमि, translated,The Land Where One Works) is a Hindi novel by Munshi Premchand.

The novel is set in the Uttar Pradesh of the 1930s. By the beginning of the 20th century, Islam and Hinduism had coexisted in India for over a thousand years. Barring the occasional outbursts of violence, the two religious communities had lived together peacefully and shared strong social bonds except marriage. English education, however, drove a wedge between the communities.

India of the early 1930s consisted of a great mass of poor and illiterate people who were exploited by the rich and powerful, irrespective of caste or religion. The author has sympathy for these poor and toiling masses, which is clearly reflected in his writings. It is against this backdrop that Premchand wrote Karmabhoomi.

Being greatly influenced by Mahatma Gandhi's satyagraha movement, Premchand weaves this novel around the social goals championed by it. Human life is portrayed as a field of action in which the character and destinies of individuals are formed and revealed through their actions. Some of these actions, which might seem melodramatic in ordinary realistic fiction, gain resonance in Karmabhoomi, placed as they are in this symbolic and philosophical framework. Each character (or group) is depicted as coming to a point of moral awakening where he, she, or they must act on their convictions. The climax takes place in an assembly of the poor and dispossessed, where they voice their demand for land. The youngest of the speakers is put to death by a policeman's bullet, and this incident eventually leads to victory of the cause of land for the poor.

== Synopsis ==
Amarkant is an intelligent and idealistic, though weak, young man who has grown up hating his father's business and adherence to the formalities of Hindu religion. He is married to Sukhada who is beautiful and intelligent but dominates him through her logical and down-to-earth approach to life.

Denied love at home and stifled by his wife, Amarkant is attracted to their watchman's granddaughter, the modest and courteous Sakina. When his father refuses to accept Sakina, Amarkant leaves home to wander from village to village. Finally settling in a village of untouchables, he teaches children and help villagers in their fight for relief against land tax.

Initially unable to comprehend her husband's sympathy for the poor, Sukhada is ultimately drawn into the movement when she sees the police firing on a nonviolent demonstration for acceptance of the untouchables inside temples. She instantaneously gains recognition and acceptance as a leader of city's poor and downtrodden.

Impelled by the desire to gain similar recognition, Amarkant deviates from the path of nonviolence in favour of direct confrontation that leads to many casualties among the farmers. He finally realises that the Gandhian path was the better one and returns to its fold.
