= Shatranj ke Khiladi =

Indian short story

Shatranj Ke Khilari (lit. 'The Chess Players') is a 1924 Hindi short-story written by Munshi Premchand. Premchand also made the Urdu version titled "Shatranj ki bazi".

== Synopsis ==
The story depicts the decadent royalty of Central North India. It is set around the life of the last independently ruling Nawab (noble) Wajid Ali Shah and concludes with the British annexation of the Nawab's kingdom of Awadh in 1856. The two main characters are the aristocrats Mirza Sajjad Ali and Mir Raushan Ali who are deeply immersed in chess. Their desire for the game destroys the competency of the characters, and makes them irresponsible in their duties towards their families and society. They derive immense pleasure in developing chess strategies and ignore the real life invasion by the British. Their city Lucknow falls to British attackers as they are busy playing a game of chess.

== Film ==
In 1977, Satyajit Ray made a film with the same name, based on this story, also titled Shatranj Ke Khilari, which won the National Film Award for Best Feature Film in Hindi.
