= Premchand =

Indian Hindustani writer (1880–1936)

Munshi Premchand
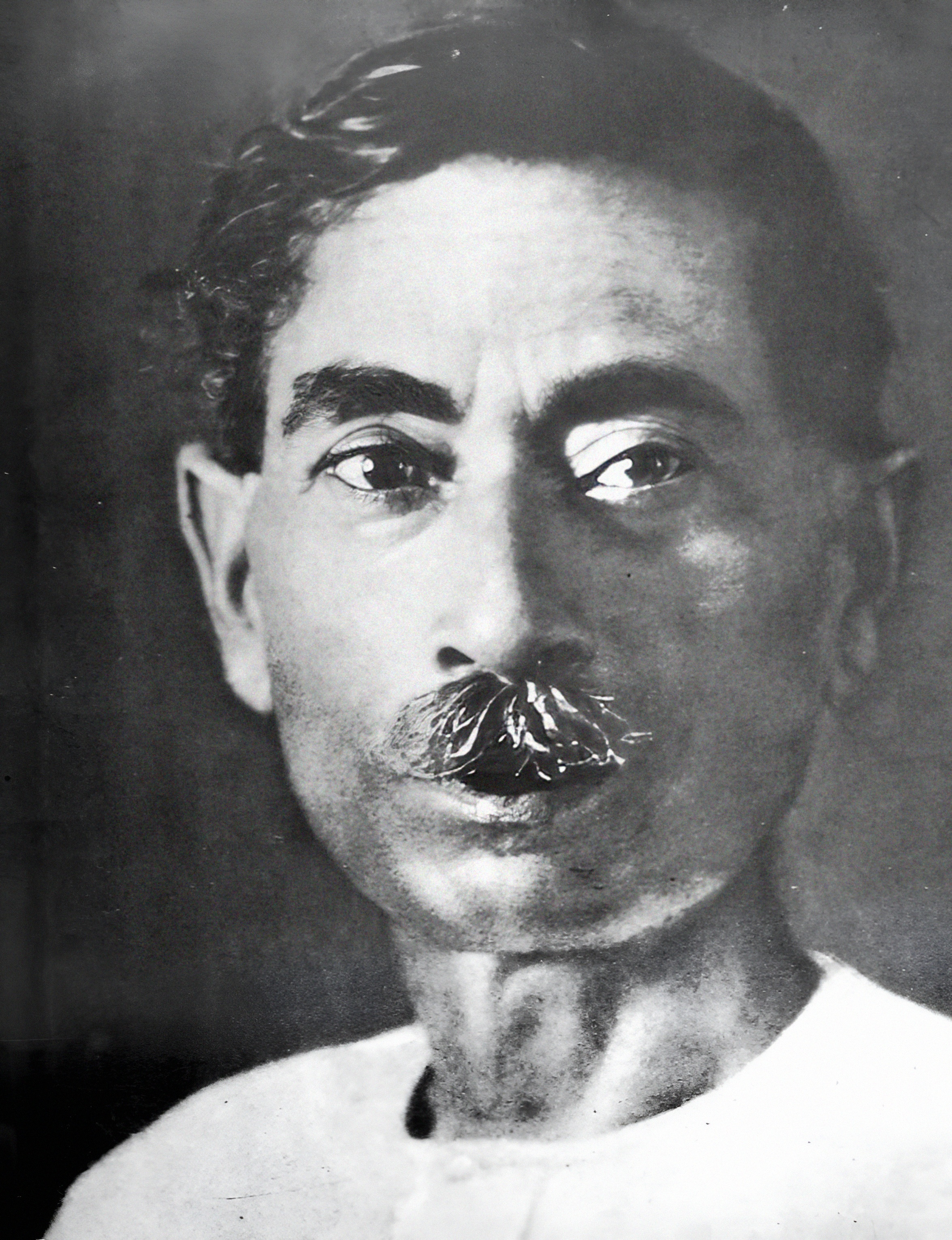
- Premchand in 1930s
- Born: Dhanpat Rai Srivastava; 31 July 1880; Lamhi, Benares State, British India (present-day Uttar Pradesh, India)
- Died: 8 October 1936 (aged 56); Benares, Benares State, British India (present-day Varanasi, Uttar Pradesh, India)
- Occupations: Novelist, short story writer
- Spouse: Unknown (m. 1895; divorced) Shivarani Devi (m. 1906; died 1936)
- Children: Amrit Rai
- Writing career
- Pen name: Premchand, Nawab Rai
- Language: Hindi, Urdu
- Years active: 1920–1936
- Notable works: Godaan, Bazaar-e-Husn, Karmabhoomi, Shatranj ke Khiladi, Gaban, Mansarovar, Idgah

Dhanpat Rai Srivastava (31 July 1880 – 8 October 1936), better known as Munshi Premchand based on his pen name Premchand (pronounced [preːm t͡ʃənd̪]), was an Indian writer famous for his modern Hindustani literature.

Premchand was a pioneer of Hindi and Urdu social fiction. He was one of the first authors to write about caste hierarchies and the plight of women and labourers of the late 1880s. He is one of the most celebrated writers of the Indian subcontinent, and is regarded as one of the foremost Hindi writers of the early twentieth century. His works include Godaan, Karmabhoomi, Gaban, Mansarovar, and Idgah. He published his first collection of five short stories in 1907 in a book called Soz-e-Watan (Sorrow of the Nation).

His works include more than a dozen novels, around 300 short stories, several essays and translations of a number of Indian and foreign literary works into Hindi.

== Biography ==
=== Early life ===
Premchand was born on 31 July 1880 in Lamhi, a village located near Banaras, and was named Dhanpat Rai ("master of wealth"). His ancestors came from a large Chitraguptavanshi Kayastha family, which owned eight to nine bighas of land. His grandfather, Guru Sahai Rai, was a patwari (village land record-keeper), and his father, Ajaib Lal, was a post office clerk. His mother was Anandi Devi of Karauni village, who probably was also his inspiration for the character Anandi in his "Bade Ghar Ki Beti". Dhanpat Rai was the fourth child of Ajaib Lal and Anandi; the first two were girls who died as infants, and the third one was a girl named sama. His uncle, Mahabir, a rich landowner, nicknamed him "Nawab", meaning baron. "Nawab Rai" was the first pen name chosen by Dhanpat Rai.

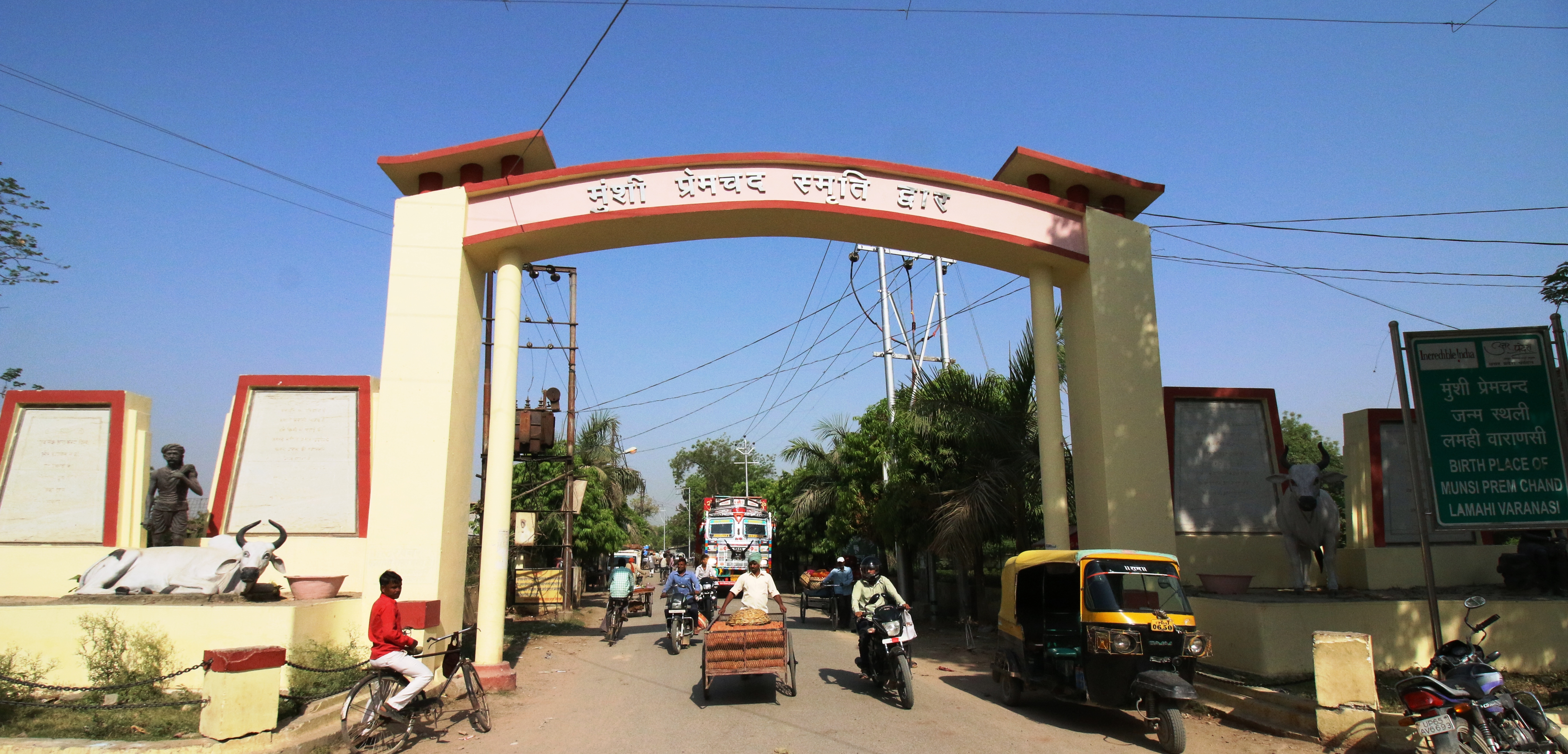
Munshi Premchand Memorial Gate, Lamhi, Varanasi

When he was seven years old, Dhanpat Rai began his education at a madrasa in Lalpur, Varanasi, located near Lamhi. He learned Urdu and Persian from a maulvi in the madrasa. When he was 8, his mother died after a long illness. His grandmother, who was responsible for raising him, died soon after. Munshi Premchand felt isolated, as his elder sister Suggi had already been married, and his father was always busy with work. His father, who was now posted at Gorakhpur, remarried, but Premchand received little affection from his stepmother. The stepmother later became a recurring theme in Premchand's works.

As a child, Dhanpat Rai sought solace in fiction and developed a fascination for books. He heard the stories of the Persian-language fantasy epic Tilism-e-Hoshruba at a tobacconist's shop. He took the job of selling books for a book wholesaler, thus getting the opportunity to read a lot of books. He learnt English at a missionary school and studied several works of fiction, including George W. M. Reynolds's eight-volume The Mysteries of the Court of London. He composed his first literary work at Gorakhpur, which was never published and is now lost. It was a farce on a bachelor who falls in love with a low caste woman. The character was based on Premchand's uncle, who used to scold him for being obsessed with reading fiction; the farce was probably written as revenge for this.

After his father was posted to Zamania in the mid-1890s, Dhanpat Rai enrolled at the Queen's College at Banaras as a day scholar. In 1895, he was married at the age of 15, while still studying in the ninth grade. The match was arranged by his maternal step-grandfather. The girl was from a rich landlord family and was older than Premchand, who found her quarrelsome and not good-looking.

His father died in 1897 after a long illness. He managed to pass the matriculation exam with second division (below 60% marks). However, only the students with the first division were given fee concessions at the Queen's College. He then sought admission at the Central Hindu School but was unsuccessful because of his poor arithmetic skills. Thus, he had to discontinue his studies. He then obtained an assignment to coach an advocate's son in Banaras at a monthly salary of five rupees. He used to reside in a mud cell over the advocate's stables and used to send 60% of his salary back home. Premchand read a lot during these days. After racking up several debts, in 1899, he went to a bookshop to sell one of his collected books. There, he met the headmaster of a missionary school at Chunar, who offered him a job as a teacher at a monthly salary of ₹18. He also took up the job of tutoring a student at a monthly fee of ₹5.

In 1900, Premchand secured a job as an assistant teacher at the Government District School, Bahraich, at a monthly salary of ₹20. Three months later, he was transferred to the District School in Pratapgarh, where he stayed in an administrator's bungalow and tutored his son.

His first short novel was Asrar-e-Ma'abid ("Secrets of God's abode", Devasthan Rahasya in Hindi), which explores corruption among the temple priests and their sexual exploitation of poor women. The novel was published in a series in the Banaras-based Urdu weekly Awaz-e-Khalq from 8 October 1903 to February 1905. Literary critic Siegfried Schulz states that "his inexperience is quite evident in his first novel", which is not well-organized, lacks a good plot and features stereotyped characters. Prakash Chandra Gupta calls it an "immature work", which shows a tendency to "see life only in black or white".

=== Stay at Kanpur ===
From Pratapgarh, Dhanpat Rai was relocated to Allahabad for training and subsequently posted at Kanpur in 1905. He stayed in Kanpur for around four years, from May 1905 to June 1909. There, he met Munshi Daya Narain Nigam, the editor of the Urdu magazine Zamana, in which he later published several articles and stories.

Premchand visited his village, Lamhi, during the summer vacation but did not find the stay enjoyable because of a number of reasons. He did not find the weather or the atmosphere conducive to writing. Moreover, he faced domestic trouble due to quarrels between his wife and his step-mother. Premchand angrily scolded his wife after she unsuccessfully tried to commit suicide by hanging. Dismayed, she went to her father's house, and Premchand displayed no interest in bringing her back. In 1906, Premchand married a child widow, Shivarani Devi, who was the daughter of a landlord from a village near Fatehpur. The step was considered to be revolutionary at that time, and Premchand faced a lot of social opposition. After his death, Shivarani Devi wrote a book on him, titled Premchand Ghar Mein ("Premchand at Home").

In 1905, inspired by nationalist activism, Premchand published an article on the Indian National Congress leader Gopal Krishna Gokhale in Zamana. He criticised Gokhale's methods for achieving political freedom and instead recommended adoption of more extremist measures adopted by Bal Gangadhar Tilak. Premchand's first published story was "Duniya ka Sabse Anmol Ratan" ("The Most Precious Jewel in the World"), which appeared in Zamana in 1907. According to this story, the most precious 'jewel' was the last drop of blood necessary to attain independence. Many of Premchand's early short stories had patriotic overtones, influenced by the Indian independence movement.

Premchand's second short novel Hamkhurma-o-Hamsavab (Prema in Hindi), published in 1907, was penned under the name "Babu Nawab Rai Banarsi". It explores the issue of widow remarriage in the contemporary conservative society: the protagonist, Amrit Rai, overcomes social opposition to marrying the young widow, Poorna, giving up his rich and beautiful fiancée Prema. According to Prakash Chandra Gupta, "While containing seeds of his future greatness in many ways, the novel is still youthful and lacks the discipline which full maturity brings".

In 1907, another of Premchand's short novels, Kishna was published by the Medical Hall Press of Banaras. This 142-page work, which satirises women's fondness for jewellery, is now lost. Literary critic Nobat Rai criticised the work in Zamana, calling it a mockery of the women's conditions.

During April–August 1907, Premchand's novel Roothi Rani was published in serial form in Zamana. Also in 1907, the publishers of Zamana published Premchand's first short story collection, titled Soz-e-Watan. The collection, which was later banned, contained four stories that sought to inspire the Indians in their struggle for political freedom.

==== Adoption of the name Premchand ====
In 1909, Premchand was transferred to Mahoba and later posted to Hamirpur as the Sub-deputy Inspector of Schools. Around this time, Soz-e-Watan was noticed by British Government officials, who banned it as a seditious work. James Samuel Stevenson, the British collector of Hamirpur district ordered a raid on Premchand's house, where around five hundred copies of Soz-e-Watan were burnt. After this, Munshi Daya Narain Nigam, the editor of the Urdu magazine Zamana, who had published Dhanpat Rai's first story "Duniya ka Sabse Anmol Ratan" advised the pseudonym "Premchand". Dhanpat Rai stopped using the name "Nawab Rai" and became Premchand.

Premchand was often referred to as Munshi Premchand. The fact is, he, along with Kanhaiyalal Munshi, edited the magazine Hans. The credit line read "Munshi, Premchand". He thenceforth began being called Munshi Premchand. In 1914, Premchand started writing in Hindi (Hindi and Urdu are considered different registers of a single language Hindustani, with Hindi drawing much of its vocabulary from Sanskrit and Urdu being more influenced by Persian). By this time, he was already reputed as a fiction writer in Urdu. Sumit Sarkar notes that the switch was prompted by the difficulty of finding publishers in Urdu. His first Hindi story "Saut" was published in the magazine Saraswati in December 1915, and his first short story collection Sapta Saroj was published in June 1917.

=== Gorakhpur ===
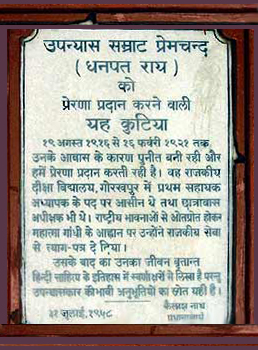
A plaque commemorating Munshi Premchand at the hut where he resided in Gorakhpur from 1916 to 1921.

In August 1916, Premchand was transferred to Gorakhpur on a promotion. He became the Assistant Master at the Normal High School, Gorakhpur.

At Gorakhpur, he developed a friendship with the bookseller Buddhi Lal, who allowed him to borrow novels for reading in exchange for selling exam cram books at the school. Premchand was an enthusiastic reader of classics in other languages and translated several of these works into Hindi.

By 1919, Premchand had published four novels of about a hundred pages each. In 1919, Premchand's first major novel Seva Sadan was published in Hindi. The novel was originally written in Urdu under the title Bazaar-e-Husn but was published in Hindi first by a Calcutta-based publisher, who offered Premchand ₹450 for his work. The Urdu Publisher of Lahore published the novel later in 1924, paying Premchand ₹250. The novel tells the story of an unhappy housewife, who first becomes a courtesan, and then manages an orphanage for the young daughters of the courtesans. It was well received by the critics and helped Premchand gain wider recognition.

In 1919, Premchand obtained a BA degree from Allahabad University. By 1921, he had been promoted to Deputy Inspectors of Schools. On 8 February 1921, he attended a meeting in Gorakhpur, where Mahatma Gandhi asked people to resign from government jobs as part of the non-cooperation movement. Premchand, although physically unwell and with two kids and a pregnant wife to support, thought about it for five days and decided, with the consent of his wife, to resign from his government job.

=== Back to Banaras ===
After quitting his job, Premchand left Gorakhpur for Banaras on 18 March 1921 and decided to focus on his literary career. Till his death in 1936, he faced severe financial difficulties and chronic ill health.

In 1923, he established a printing press and publishing house in Banaras, christened "Saraswati Press". The year 1924 saw the publication of Premchand's Rangbhoomi, which has a blind beggar called Surdas as its tragic hero. Schulz mentions that in Rangbhoomi, Premchand comes across as a "superb social chronicler", and although the novel contains some "structural flaws" and "too many authorial explanations", it shows a "marked progress" in Premchand's writing style. According to Schulz, it was in Nirmala (1925) and Pratigya (1927) that Premchand found his way to "a balanced, realistic level" that surpasses his earlier works and manages to "hold his readers in tutelage". Nirmala, a novel dealing with the dowry system in India, was first serialised in the magazine Chand between November 1925 and November 1926, before being published as a novel. Pratigya ("The Vow") dealt with the subject of widow remarriage.

In 1928, Premchand's novel Gaban ("Embezzlement"), focusing on the middle class' greed, was published. In March 1930, Premchand launched a literary-political weekly magazine titled Hans, aimed at inspiring the Indians to mobilise against the British rule. The magazine, noted for its politically provocative views, failed to make a profit. Premchand then took over and edited another magazine called Jagaran, which, too, ran at a loss.

In 1931, Premchand moved to Kanpur as a teacher at the Marwari College but had to leave because of differences with the college administration. He then returned to Banaras and became the editor of the Maryada magazine. In 1932, he published another novel titled Karmabhoomi. He briefly served as the headmaster of the Kashi Vidyapeeth, a local school. After the school's closure, he became the editor of the Madhuri magazine in Lucknow.

=== Bombay ===
Premchand arrived in Bombay on 31 May 1934 to try his luck in the Hindi film industry. He had accepted a script writing job for the production house Ajanta Cinetone, hoping that the yearly salary of ₹8,000 would help him overcome his financial troubles. He stayed in Dadar, and wrote the script for the film Mazdoor ("The Labourer"). The film, directed by Mohan Bhawnani, depicted the poor conditions of the labour class. Premchand himself did a cameo as the leader of labourers in the film. Some influential businessmen managed to get a stay on its release in Bombay. The film was released in Lahore and Delhi but was banned again after it inspired the mill workers to stand up against the owners.

Ironically, the film inspired the workers of his own loss-making press in Banaras to launch a strike after they were not paid their salaries. By 1934–35, Premchand's Saraswati Press was under a heavy debt of ₹400, and Premchand was forced to discontinue the publication of Jagaran. Meanwhile, Premchand was beginning to dislike the non-literary commercial environment of the Bombay film industry, and wanted to return to Banaras. However, he had signed a one-year contract with the production house. He ultimately left Bombay on 4 April 1935, before the completion of one year. Himanshu Roy, the founder of Bombay Talkies, tried to convince Premchand to stay back but failed.

=== Last days ===
After leaving Bombay, Premchand wanted to settle in Allahabad, where his sons Sripat Rai and Amrit Kumar Rai were studying. He also planned to publish Hans from there. However, owing to his financial situation and ill health, he had to hand over Hans to the Indian Literary Counsel and move to Banaras.

Premchand was elected as the first President of the Progressive Writers' Association in Lucknow in 1936. He died on 8 October 1936, after several days of sickness and while still in office.

Godaan (The Gift of a Cow, 1936), Premchand's last completed work, is generally accepted as his best novel and is considered one of the finest Hindi novels. The protagonist, Hori, a poor peasant, desperately longs for a cow, a symbol of wealth and prestige in rural India. According to Siegfried Schulz, "Godān is a well-structured and well-balanced novel which amply fulfils the literary requirements postulated by Western literary standards." Unlike other contemporary renowned authors such as Rabindranath Tagore, Premchand was not appreciated much outside India. Schulz believes that the reason for this was the absence of good translations of his work. Also, unlike Tagore and Iqbal, Premchand never travelled outside India, studied abroad or mingled with renowned foreign literary figures.

In 1936, Premchand also published "Kafan" ("Shroud"), in which a poor man collects money for the funeral rites of his dead wife but spends it on food and drink. Premchand's last published story was "Cricket Match", which appeared in Zamana in 1938, after his death.

== Style and influences ==
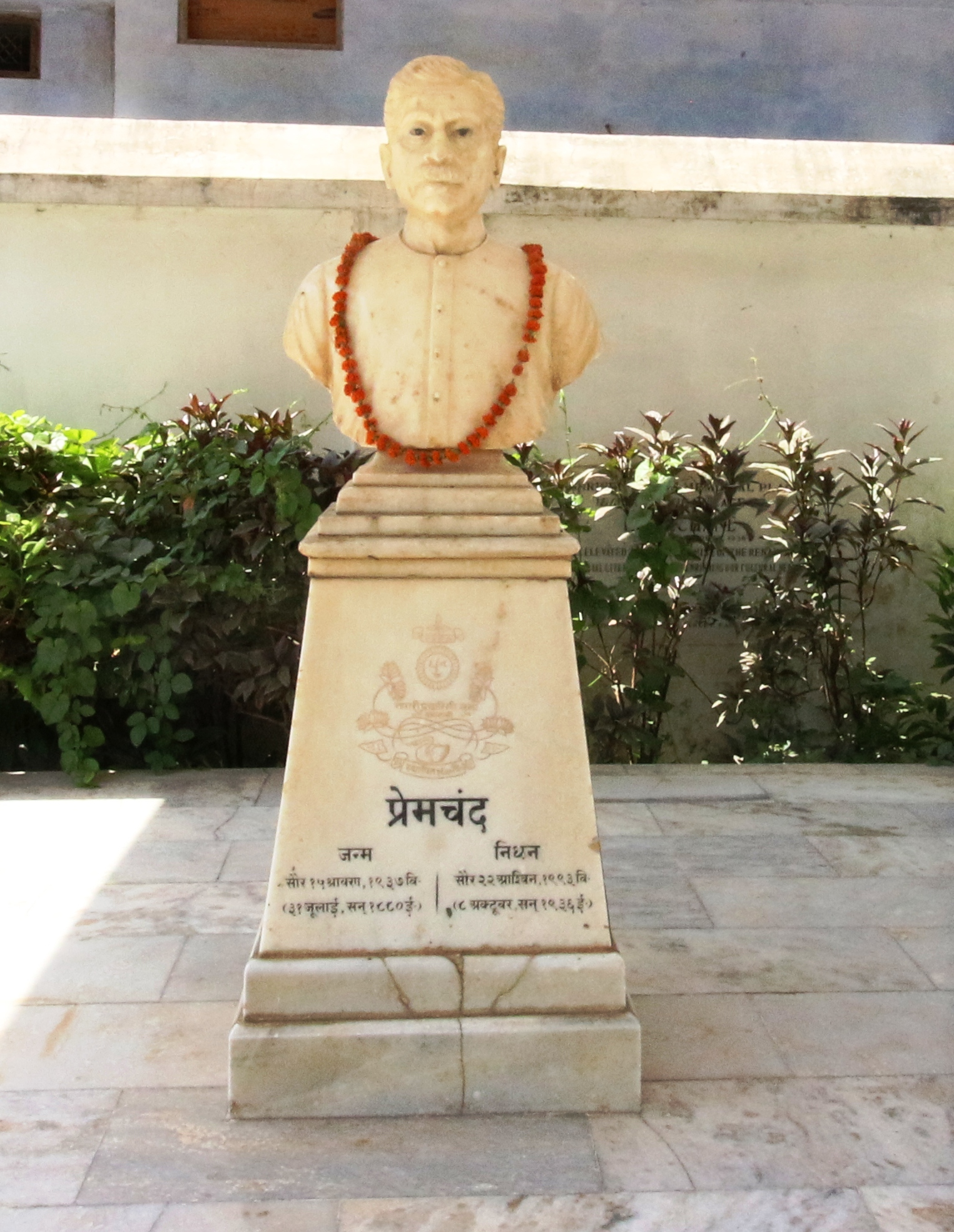
Bust of Premchand in Lamhi

Premchand is considered the first Hindi author whose writings prominently featured realism. His novels describe the problems of the poor and the urban middle-class. His works depict a rationalistic outlook, which views religious values as something that allows the powerful hypocrites to exploit the weak. He used literature for the purpose of arousing public awareness about national and social issues and often wrote about topics related to corruption, child widowhood, prostitution, feudal system, poverty, colonialism and on the Indian independence movement.

Premchand started taking an interest in political affairs while at Kanpur during the late 1900s, and this is reflected in his early works, which have patriotic overtones. His political thoughts were initially influenced by the moderate Indian National Congress leader Gopal Krishna Gokhale, but later, he moved towards the more extremist Bal Gangadhar Tilak. He considered the Minto–Morley Reforms and the Montagu–Chelmsford Reforms as inadequate, and supported greater political freedom. Several of his early works, such as A Little Trick and A Moral Victory, satirised the Indians who cooperated with the British Government. He did not specifically mention the British in some of his stories because of strong government censorship but disguised his opposition in settings from the medieval era and foreign history. He was also influenced by the teachings of Swami Vivekananda.

In the 1920s, he was influenced by Mahatma Gandhi's non-cooperation movement and the accompanying struggle for social reform. During this period, his works dealt with social issues such as poverty, zamindari exploitation (Premashram, 1922), dowry system (Nirmala, 1925), educational reform and political oppression (Karmabhoomi, 1931). Premchand was focused on the economic liberalisation of the peasantry and the working class and opposed rapid industrialisation, which he felt would hurt the interests of the peasants and lead to the oppression of the workers. This can be seen in works like Rangbhoomi (1924).

Premchand's influence on Indian literature cannot be overstated. As the late scholar David Rubin wrote in The World of Premchand (1969), "To Premchand belongs the distinction of creating the genre of the serious short story—and the serious novel as well—in both Hindi and Urdu. Virtually single-handed, he lifted fiction in these languages from a quagmire of aimless romantic chronicles to a high level of realistic narrative comparable to European fiction of the time; and in both languages, he has, in addition, remained an unsurpassed master."

In his last days, he focused on village life as a stage for complex drama, as seen in the novel Godaan (1936) and the short-story collection Kafan (1936). Premchand believed that social realism was the way for Hindi literature, as opposed to the "feminine quality", tenderness and emotion of the contemporary Bengali literature.

== Legacy ==
Premchand was commemorated with the issue of a special 30-paise postage stamp by India Post on 31 July 1980.

Premchand's ancestral house in Lamhi is being restored by the state government. An institute has also been set up in Lamhi to study his work. The Munshi Premchand Mahavidyalaya in Siliguri has been named after him.

An Archive Centre in the name of Munshi Premchand has been established at the Central University Jamia Millia Islamia. It came to store the legacy of Premchand's writings as his famous story 'Kafan' was written by him in Jamia itself and it was first published in 'Jamia '.

On 31 July 2016, Google showed a Google Doodle in honouring the 136th birthday of Munshi Premchand.

== List of works ==
Premchand wrote over three hundred short stories and fourteen novels, many essays and letters, plays and translations. Many of Premchand's works were translated into English and Russian after his death.

=== Novels ===
Sr.No.	Hindi title	Urdu title	Publisher	Written Language	Serial form	Published as Novel	Length (Pages) Approx.	Notes
1.	Devasthan Rahasya	Asrar-e-Ma'abid	Awaz-e-Khalk (serial form)	Urdu	8 Oct. 1903 – Feb. 1905		116	Not completed and mostly lost.
2.	Kishna	Kishna	Medical Hall Press, Banaras	Urdu		1907	142	Written in 1902. Entirely lost; satirises women's fondness for jewellery.
3.	Prema	Hum Khurma-o-Hum sawab	Indian Press/Hindustan Publishing House	Urdu		1907	112	Again rewritten as 'Pratigya' in 1927.
4.	Roothi Rani	Roothi Rani	Zamana (serial form)	Urdu	April – August 1907		80	Premchand's only historical novel.
–		Soz-e-Watan	Publishers of Zamana	Urdu	–	1908	66	A Story collection of five stories written in 1907 and pub. in June 1908. Banned and burned 700 copies by the British Government in 1909.
5.	Seva Sadan	Bazaar-e-Husn	Calcutta Pustak Agency (Hindi)	Urdu	–	1919	280	Written in Urdu in 1916 but not published; translated into Hindi in 1919 and published. Later published in Urdu in 1924.
6.	Vardaan	Jalwa-e-Isar	Granth Malal Karyalaya	Urdu	–	1921	128	Written in Urdu in 1912 but not published; translated into Hindi in 1921 and published. Later published in Urdu in 1922.
7.	Premashram	Gosha-e-Aafiyat	Saraswati Press	Urdu	–	1922	450	Written around 1918 to 1920 in Urdu but first published in Hindi in 1922.
8.	Rangbhoomi	Chaugan-e-Hasti	Saraswati Press	Urdu	–	1925	672	Written around 1922 to 1924 in Urdu but first published in Hindi in 1925.
9.	Kaayakalp	Parda-i-Majaz	Saraswati Press	Hindi	–	1926	440	First novel by Premchand written in Hindi. Later published in Urdu in 1934. Also has a shorter version 'Manorama'.
10.	Nirmala	Nirmala	Chand magazine, Saraswati Press	Hindi	Nov. 1925 – Nov. 1926	1927	156	About the dowry system in India; serialized in the magazine Chand .
11.	Pratigya	Bewa	Chand magazine, Saraswati Press	Hindi	Jan. 1927 – Nov. 1927	1929	130	Rewritten version of Prema(1907); serialized in the magazine Chand .
12.	Gaban	Ghaban	Saraswati Press	Hindi	1930–1931	1931	348	Gaban is a novel that portrays the moral decline of Ramanath, a hero who succumbs to the temptation of embezzlement. The novel highlights themes of greed, morality, and societal expectations.
13.	Karmabhoomi	Maidan-e-Amal	Saraswati Press	Hindi	1931–1932	1932	280	Set in 1930, this masterpiece by Premchand talks about the unity of Hindus and Muslim and their exploitation by the British which eventually resulted in partition much later.
14.	Godaan	Godaan	Saraswati Press	Hindi	1935–1936	1936	394	Themed around the socio-economic deprivation as well as the exploitation of the village poor.
15.	Mangalsootra		Hindustan Publishing House	Hindi				Written in 1936 but incomplete novel; Premchand completed only the first four chapters (around 70 pages) of this novel.

=== Short stories ===
Several of Premchand's stories have been published in a number of collections, including the 8-volume Mansarovar (1900–1936). Some of his stories include:

Title	Publisher	Date	Description
"Jihad" (Hindi)	premchand's story collection "Mansarovar" part-7 story#14 173-180		A story on how extremist education destroys the harmony of society. A vivid description by Premchand of social issues in the 1920s
"Lekhak" (Hindi) "Adeeb ki Izat" (Urdu)			A story of a writer who wanted respect and recognition for his work but later realised that he is a candle that will have to burn, giving light to others.
"Duniya ka Sabse Anmol Ratan"	Zamana	1907	The title means "The Most Precious Jewel in the World", which, according to the story, is the drop of the blood necessary for the nation's independence.
"Bade Bhai Sahab"	Zamana	1910 (December)	A story of two brothers, their conflict, resolution and understanding.
"Beti ka Dhan"	Zamana	1915 (November)	It is the story about Sukkhu Chaudhri, a farmer who was helped by his daughter, Gangajali, by selling her jewellery to help her father pay his debts.
"Saut"	Sarasvati (Vol. 16, Part 2, No. 6, 353–359)	1915 (December)	The title means "Co-Wife".
"Sajjanata ka Dand"	Sarasvati	1916 (March)	The title means "The Penalty for Integrity".
"Panch Parameshvar"	Sarasvati	1916 (June)	A friendship is marred when one friend delivers a verdict against the other. The story narrates how they reunite as friends.
"Ishwariya Nyaya"	Sarasvati	1917 (July)	The title means "The Divine Law".
"Beton Wali Vidhwa"	Sarasvati	1920 (July)	
"Durga ka Mandir"	Sarasvati	1917 (December)	The title means "The Temple of Durga".
"Maa"	Sarasvati	1921 (November)	The title means "Mother".
"Ghar Jamai"	Sarasvati	1933 (June)	
"Dhikkar"	Sarasvati	1925 (May)	
"Dil ki Rani"	Sarasvati	1926 (December)	The title means "The Queen Of The Heart"
"Gulli Danda"	Sarasvati	1925 (May)	Gulli Danda was a very popular sport in rural India; it was played with a stick and a smaller 'puck' of stick', somewhat similar to cricket. The story is about a man who goes back to his village and tries to play Gulli Danda with his old friends. However, the disparity between their economic and social status does not allow a fair game.
"Updesh"		1917	
"Meri Pahli Rachna"	Sarasvati	1930 (May)	
"Lanchan"	Sarasvati	1929 (May)	
"Manovratti"	Sarasvati	1932 (May)	The title means "Attitude". In the story, various people misjudge the intentions of a young woman lying in the park. The end reveals their attitudes and prejudices had completely failed them.
"Balidan"	Sarasvati	1918 (May)	The title means "Sacrifice".
"Putra Prem"	Sarasvati	1920 (July)	The title means "Love of a Son".
"Boodhi Kaki"	Hans	1921	The title means "The Old Aunt". A story of an old woman who craves love from her family.
"Pariksha"	Chand	1923 (January)	The title means "The Test". Its background is the Nadir Shah's invasion and sack of Delhi.
"Shatranj ke Khiladi" (Hindi) "Shatranj ki Bazi" (Urdu)	Madhuri	October 1924	Two aristocrats—Mirza Sajjad Ali and Mir Roshan Ali—lived in the kingdom of Awadh during the times of the British Raj. Both of them are careless towards their duties and spend their days playing chess. Their love for the game is so immense that even when the ruler of Awadh, Wajid Ali Shah, is captured by the British, they continue playing chess. In the end, a move in the game sparks a verbal conflict between them, and they end up killing each other with their swords.
"Hinsa Parmo Dharma"	Madhuri	1926 (December)	
"Ghasvali"	Madhuri	1929 (December)	
"Idgah"	Chand	1933 (August)	A poor boy in India lives with his grandmother. On the festival day of Eid, the other kids buy themselves candies and toys. The poor boy, thinking of his grandmother, buys a pair of tongs to help her make rotis since she burns her hands trying to cook them bare-handed.
"Nashaa"	Chand	1934 (February)	Two friends from different strata of society study away from their homes. The story explores class disparity and aspirations in their friendship. It has an autobiographical touch.
"Kafan"	Jamia	1936	A low-caste father and his son are poor labourers in a village. An emergency occurs when the son's wife dies while giving birth to a child, and the family has no money to cremate the body of the dead woman. The lazy duo ask for money from the village Zamindar and other members of the society. However, they use the money they get on liquor and food instead.
"Cricket Match"	Zamana	1937	Published posthumously.
"Gupt Dhan"			Haridas, a man of character, owns a brick factory. He loses his character when he gets a map of a hereditary treasure of a worker, but eventually dies as a punishment of god.
"Mantra"			The selfishness of a rich doctor named Chaddha results in the death of a patient. The same patient's father selflessly cures Dr. Chaddha's son when the doctor meets the same sort of situation.
"Namak ka Daroga"		1925 (May)	The title means "The Salt Inspector". An idealist becomes a police officer and faces problems while performing his duties.
"Poos ki Raat"	Madhuri	1930 (May)	The title means "A night of the Poos month (Winter)". A poor farmer stays out with his dog to protect his field on an extremely cold December night.
"Lottery"	Zamana		It is a story of an Indian family in which every member bought a ticket for a 1 million rupees worth lottery. After some time, they began to fight over what they would do if anyone won the lottery, but at last, neither from their home nor even town, state, or country won the lottery but someone from America did.
"Vidhwans"			The title means "Catastrophe". An old widow with no children is engulfed in a fire caused by the owner of the village intentionally, and therefore, the pandit pays for the price.
"Kazaki"			A story of love, adoration and friendship between a little boy and Kazaki, a poor but cheerful and jolly man who used to work under his father.

Other stories include:

- "Abhushan"
- "Agni Samadhi"
- "Alagyojha"
- "Amrit"
- "Atmaram"
- "Bade Ghar ki Beti" (1926)
- "Bhoot" (1926)
- "Chori"
- "Daroga Sahab"
- "Devi"
- "Dhaai ser Gehun"
- "Dikri ke Rupaye"
- "Do Bahanein"
- "Do Sakhiyan" (1926)
- "Do Bailon ki Katha"
- "Do Kabren" (1920)
- "Doodh ka Damm" (1910)
- "Gilli danda"
- "Grihaneeti"
- "Gurumantra" (1927)
- "Har ki Jeet" (1925)
- "Jail" (1931)
- "Jihad"
- "Juloos" (1930)
- "Jurmana"
- "Khudai Fauzdaar"
- "Mahatirtha"
- "Manushya ka Param Dharma" (March 1920)
- "Maryada ki Vedi"
- "Mukti Marg" (1922)
- "Muktidhan" (1921)
- "Mamta" (1928)
- "Mandir" (1927)
- "Nairashya"
- "Nimantran" (1926)
- "Pashu se Manushya"
- "Prayaschit"
- "Prem Purnima"
- "Prem ka Uday" (1923)
- "Prerna" (1925)
- "Ramleela" (1926)
- "Samar Yatra" (1930)
- "Sati" (1925)
- "Satyagraha" (1923)
- "Sawa ser Gehun" (1921)
- "Sewa Marg"
- "Subhagi"
- "Suhag ki Sari" (1923)
- "Sujan Bhagat"
- "Rani Sarndha" (1930)
- "Swatva Raksha"
- "Thakur ka Kuaan" (1924)
- "Thriya Charita"
- "Tagada" (1924)
- "Khoon Safed" (1923)
- "Udhar ki Ghadi"
- "Vajrpaat" (1922)
- "Raja Hardaul" (1925)
- "Vimata"
- "Hajje Akbar"
- "Sautele Maa"
- "Kajaki" (1921)
- "Ibrat"
- "Roshni"
- "Bhadde ka Tattu" (1922)
- "Nijat"
- "Mazdoor"
- "Kazaaki" (1921)
- "Mritak Bhoj" (1922)

=== Translations ===
Premchand translated several non-Hindi works into Hindi. These included the writings of Ratan Nath Dhar Sarshar, Jawaharlal Nehru, Charles Dickens (The Story of Richard Doubledick), Oscar Wilde (Canterville), John Galsworthy (Strife), Saadi Shirazi, Guy de Maupassant, Maurice Maeterlinck (The Sightless) and Hendrik Willem van Loon (The Story of Mankind).

Some of the translated titles include:

Premchand's title	Original
Ahankar	Thaïs by Anatole France (adaptation)
Azad Katha	Fasana-e-Azad (1880) by Ratan Nath Dhar Sarshar
Parvat Yatra	Sair-e-Kohsar (1890) by Ratan Nath Dhar Sarshar
Chandi ki Dibiya	The Silver Box (1906) by John Galsworthy
Hartal	Strife (1909) by John Galsworthy
Nyaya	Justice (1910) by John Galsworthy
Sukhdas	Silas Marner by George Eliot (adaptation)
Tolstoy ki Kahaniyan	Stories of Leo Tolstoy

=== Other ===
Film script

- Mill (Mazdoor), (1934)

This is the only film written by the acclaimed writer Munshi Premchand in which he also played a cameo. The film courted controversy owing to its story of the prodigal son of a benevolent mill worker who inherits the mill and proceeds to treat its workers with disdain.

Plays

- Karbala
- Tajurba
- Prem ki Vedi
- Roohani Shadi
- Sangram

Essays

- Kuchh Vichar (two parts)
- Qalam Tyag aur Talwar

Biographies

- Durgadas
- Mahatma Sheikhsadi (biography of Saadi)

Children's books

- Bal Kahaniyan Sumpurn
- Manmodak
- Ram Charcha

== Adaptations of Premchand's works ==
Sevasadanam (1938) was made into a film with M. S. Subbulakshmi in the lead role. The novel is set in Varanasi, the holy city of Hindus. Sevasadan ("House of Service") is an institute built for the daughters of courtesans. The lead of the novel is a beautiful, intelligent and talented girl named Suman. She belongs to a high caste. She is married to a much older, tyrannical man. She realises that a loveless marriage is just like prostitution, except that there is only one client. Bholi, a courtesan, lives opposite Suman. Suman realises that Bholi is "outside purdah" while she is "inside it". Suman leaves her husband and becomes a successful entertainer of gentlemen. But after a brief period of success, she ends up as a victim of a political drama played out by self-righteous Hindu social reformers and moralists.

A film version of Premchand's novel, Gaban, was released in 1966. Sunil Dutt, Sadhana Shivdasani, Kanhaiyalal and Leela Mishra acted in the film and the music was scored by musician duo Shankar–Jaikishan. Heera Moti, a 1959 Indian Hindi-language film directed by Krishan Chopra, was based on Premchand's "Do Bailon ki Katha".

In 1977, Satyajit Ray made a film based on Premchand's short story "Shatranj ke Khiladi" ("The Chess Players"), which won the National Film Award for Best Feature Film in Hindi. The film revolves around the decadence of nawabi Lucknow, where the obsession with a game consumes the players, making them oblivious of their responsibilities in the midst of a crisis.

Oka Oori Katha (A Story of a Village) is a 1977 Telugu film directed by Mrinal Sen. It is based on the story "Kafan" by Munshi Premchand. It is one of the few art films made in the Telugu language.

Indian film director Satyen Bose adapted Premchand's "Panch Parmeshwar" into the 1979 film Saanch Ko Aanch Nahin. Bazaar E Husn, a 2014 Indian Hindi-language film, was based on Premchand's novel of the same name. A 2019 Indian film, Ek Betuke Aadmi Ki Afrah Raatein, was based on Fyodor Dostoevsky's "White Nights" and "The Dream of a Ridiculous Man", and Premchand's "Bhoot".

At least three television series based on Premchand's works have been aired by the Indian national public broadcaster Doordarshan on DD National which include Munshi Premchand's Guldasta, Munshi Premchand ki Kahani, and Tehreer Munshi Premchand Ki. The television films Sadgati (based on a Premchand short story) and Seva Sadan (based on Bazaar-e-Husn) were also aired by Doordarshan.

== Bibliography ==
- Schulz, Siegfried A. (1981). Premchand: A Western Appraisal. Indian Council for Cultural Relations. OCLC 10062769.
- Gupta, Prakash Chandra (1998). Prem Chand. Makers of Indian Literature. Sahitya Akademi. ISBN 978-81-260-0428-7.
- Sigi, Rekha (2006). Munshi Premchand. A.H.W. Sameer Series. Diamond. ISBN 978-81-288-1214-9.
