= National Highway 128A (India) =

National Highway in India

National Highway 128A

Route information
- Auxiliary route of NH 28
- Length: 72 km (45 mi)

Major junctions
- East end: Mohammadpur, U.P.
- West end: Jaunpur

Location
- Country: India
- States: Uttar Pradesh

Highway system
- Roads in India; Expressways; National; State; Asian
← NH 28	→ NH 31

National Highway 128A, commonly referred to as NH 128A is a national highway in India. It is a secondary route of National Highway 28. NH-128A runs in the state of Uttar Pradesh in India.

== Route ==
NH128A connects Mohammadpur azamgarh-, Via Bardah and gaura Badshapur and Jaunpur in the state of Uttar Pradesh.

== Junctions ==
NH 28 Terminal near Mohammadpur.
NH 31 Terminal near Jaunpur.

== See also ==
- List of national highways in India
- List of national highways in India by state
