= Idgah (short story) =

- Short story by Premchand
- Country: India
- Language: Hindustani

Publication
- Published in: Chand
- Publication type: Periodical
- Publication date: 1938

"Idgah" is a Hindustani-language story written by the Indian author Premchand. Written under the name Nawab Rai, it is one of Premchand’s best-known works.

== Story ==
"Idgah" tells the story of a four-year-old orphan, named Hamid who lives with his grandmother Amina. Hamid, the protagonist of the story, has recently lost his parents; however, his grandmother tells him that his father has gone to earn money, and he will come back with sackloads of silver, and that his mother has gone to God's house to fetch lovely gifts for him. This fills Hamid with hope, and despite Amina's worry surrounding their poverty and her grandson's well-being, Hamid is a happy and positive child.

The story begins on Eid morning, as Hamid sets out for the Eidgah with other boys from the village. Hamid is notably impoverished next to his friends, poorly dressed and famished-looking, and has only three paisas as Eidi for the festival. The other boys spend their pocket money on rides, candies, and beautiful clay toys, and tease Hamid when he dismisses this as a waste of money for momentary pleasure. While his friends are enjoying themselves, he overcomes his temptation and goes to a hardware shop to buy a pair of tongs, remembering how his grandmother burns her fingers while cooking rotis.

As they return to the village, Hamid's friends tease him for his purchase, extolling the virtues of their toys over his tongs. Hamid retorts with several clever arguments and before long his friends become more enamoured with the tongs than their own playthings, even offering to trade their items for his, which Hamid refuses. The story ends on a touching note when Hamid gifts the tongs to his grandmother. At first she scolds him for making the purchase, rather than buying something to eat or drink at the fair, until Hamid reminds her of how she burns her fingers daily. She bursts into tears at this and blesses him for his kindness.

== Adaptations ==
The story appears in Indian textbooks, and its adaptions also appear in moral education books such as The Joy of Living.

The story has been adapted into several plays and other performances. Asi-Te-Karave Yied (2008) is a Kashmiri adaption of the story by Shehjar Children's Theatre Group, Srinagar. Mujeeb Khan has also adapted it into a play as part of the series Adaab Mein Premchand Hoon. The Rashtriya Kathak Sansthan, Lucknow, has adapted the story into a Kathak performance.

It was adapted as an episode in the Indian television series Tehreer...Munshi Premchand Ki by Gulzar, which aired on DD National.

5 Rupya (transl. 5 Rupees) is a 2017 Indian film adaptation of the short story by Piyush Panjuani starring Shabana Azmi, set in the present-day Himalayan foothills.
