= National Highway 124D (India) =

National Highway in India

National Highway 124D
- Map of National Highway 124D in red

Route information
- Auxiliary route of NH 24
- Length: 59 km (37 mi)

Major junctions
- North end: Mardah
- South end: Saidpur

Location
- Country: India
- States: Uttar Pradesh

Highway system
- Roads in India; Expressways; National; State; Asian
← NH 24	→ NH 31

National Highway 124D, commonly referred to as NH 124D is a national highway in India. It is a secondary route of National Highway 24. NH-124D runs in the state of Uttar Pradesh in India.

== Route ==
NH124D connects Mardah, Jakhania, Sadat and Saidpur in the state of Uttar Pradesh.

== Junctions ==
NH 24 Terminal near Mardah.
NH 31 Terminal near Saidpur.

== See also ==
- List of national highways in India
- List of national highways in India by state
