= Mandapeshwar metro station =

Mumbai Metro's Yellow Line 2A metro station

Mandapeshwar (IC Colony) मंडपेश्वर (आय. सी. कॉलनी)

General information
- Location: I C Colony, Borivali, Mumbai, Maharashtra 400068
- Coordinates: 19°14′58″N 72°50′45″E
- Owner: Mumbai Metropolitan Region Development Authority
- Operator: Maha Mumbai Metro Operation Corporation Ltd.
- Line: Line 2A
- Platforms: 2 side platforms

Construction
- Structure type: Elevated
- Parking: No

Other information
- Station code: 204

History
- Opened: 2 April 2022; 4 years ago

Services
Preceding station	Mumbai Metro	Following station
Eksar towards Andheri (West)	Line 2A	Kandarpada towards Dahisar (East)
Route map
Yellow Line
Location

Mandapeshwar (IC Colony) is an elevated metro station on the North-South corridor of the Yellow Line 2A of Mumbai Metro in Mumbai, India. This metro station is located in IC Colony Road in North Mumbai. This station is owned by the Mumbai Metropolitan Region Development Authority (MMRDA), and was inaugurated on 2 April 2022.

== History ==
J Kumar Infraprojects was awarded the contract to construct the station in June 2016. The MMRDA announced that electrification of the line had been completed on 26 May 2020.

Mandapeshwar was opened to the public on 2 April 2022, along with the first phase of Line 2A.

== Station layout ==
2nd Floor	Side platform
2nd Floor	Platform 1	towards Dahisar (East) (Kandarpada) →
2nd Floor	Platform 2	← towards Andheri (West) (Eksar)
2nd Floor	Side platform
1st Floor	Mezzanine	Fare control, station agent, Metro Card vending machines, crossover
Ground	Street level	Exit/Entrance

=== Power and signaling system ===
Like all other stations and railways of Mumbai metro, Mandapeshwar IC Colony station also uses 25,000 volt AC power system by overhead catenary to operate the trains.
