= Kandarpada metro station =

Mumbai Metro's Yellow Line 2A metro station

Kandarpada कांदरपाडा
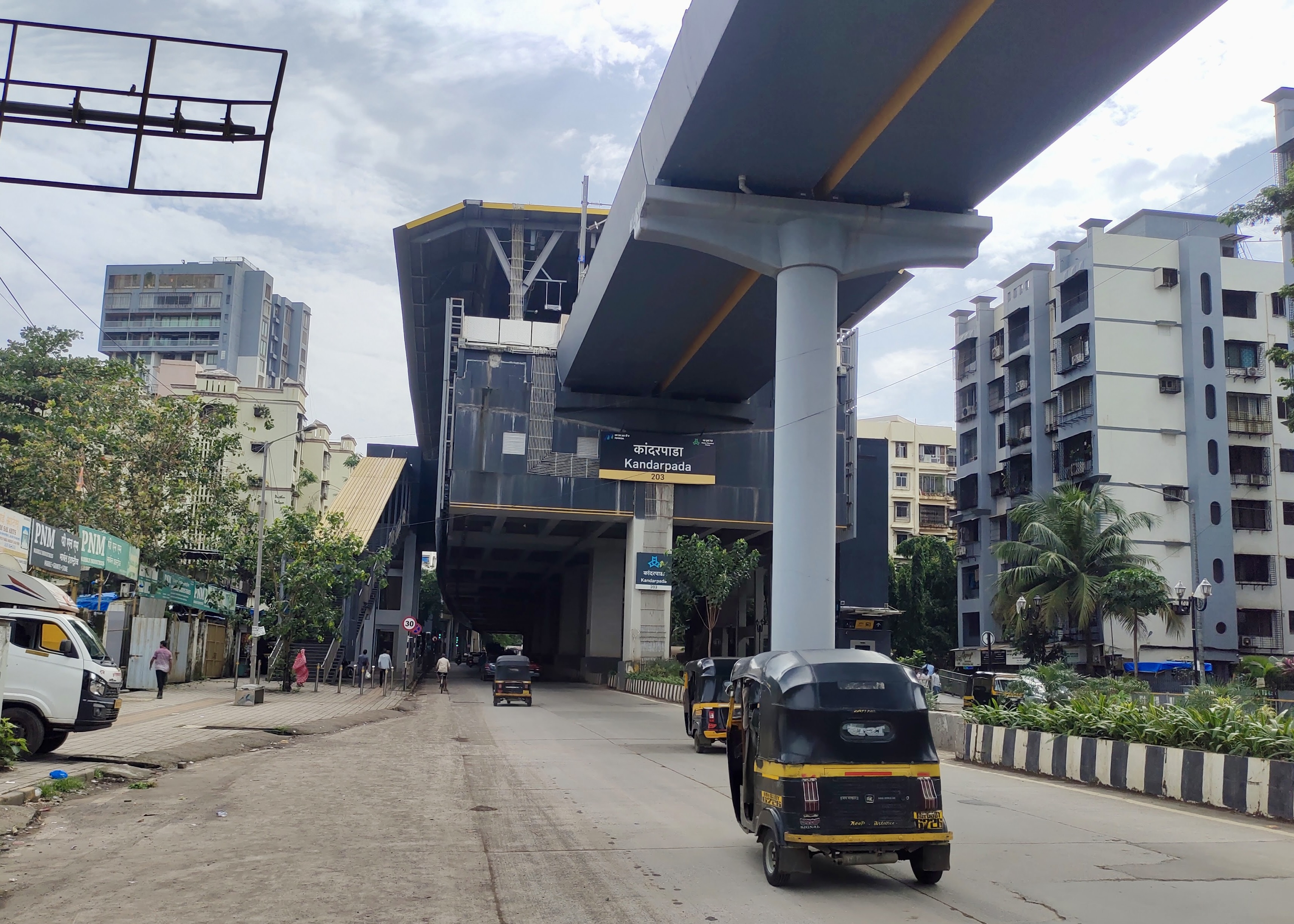

General information
- Location: Kandarpada, Dahisar West, Mumbai, Maharashtra 400068
- Coordinates: 19°15′24″N 72°51′02″E
- Owner: Mumbai Metropolitan Region Development Authority
- Operator: Maha Mumbai Metro Operation Corporation Ltd.
- Line: Line 2A
- Platforms: 2 side platform

Construction
- Structure type: Elevated
- Parking: No

Other information
- Station code: 203

History
- Opened: 2 April 2022; 4 years ago

Services
Preceding station	Mumbai Metro	Following station
Mandapeshwar towards Andheri (West)	Line 2A	Anand Nagar towards Dahisar (East)
Route map
Yellow Line
Location

Kandarpada is an elevated metro station on the North-South corridor of the Yellow Line 2A of the Mumbai Metro in Mumbai, India. This metro station is located on CS Link Road in Dahisar, Mumbai. This station is owned by the Mumbai Metropolitan Region Development Authority (MMRDA), and was inaugurated on 2 April 2022.

== History ==
J Kumar Infraprojects was awarded the contract to construct the station in June 2016. The MMRDA announced that electrification of the line had been completed on 26 May 2020.

Kandarpada was opened to the public on 2 April 2022, along with the first phase of Line 2A.

== Station layout ==
2nd Floor	Side platform
2nd Floor	Platform 1	towards Dahisar (East) (Anand Nagar) →
2nd Floor	Platform 2	← towards Andheri (West) (Mandapeshwar)
2nd Floor	Side platform
1st Floor	Mezzanine	Fare control, station agent, Metro Card vending machines, crossover
Ground	Street level	Exit/Entrance

=== Power and signaling system ===
Like all other stations and railways of Mumbai metro, Kandarpada station also uses 25,000 volt AC power system by overhead catenary to operate the trains.
