= Rangbhoomi =

Hindi novel by Premchand

- Cover page of the novel
- Author: Munshi Premchand
- Original title: Rangbhoomi
- Language: Hindi
- Genre: Fiction
- Published: 1924
- Publisher: Darul Ishat
- Publication place: India
- Media type: Novel
- ISBN: 9788122205329

Rangbhoomi: The Arena of Life (Note: The first word is also sometimes spelt as Rangabhoomi, Rangabhumi or Rangbhumi) is a Hindi-language novel by Premchand. It features an idealist protagonist inspired by Gandhian values. First published in 1924, the novel covers complex human relationships and emotions, with various themes, including problems faced by poor people due to industrialisation during British Raj. Set in colonial India, the novel presents a grim account of a blind beggar, Soordas, against the acquisition of his ancestral land. The theme of the oppression of working classes is typical as in other Premchand works. Among Premchand's works, Soordas is the character with the most significant Gandhian influence. He is simple and fearless, and personifies the protest against industrialisation in his village, consistent with the Gandhian views on industrialisation.

== Content ==
The novel revolves around several characters, covering different aspects of life such as lust, agony, bravery, truth, righteousness, duty, moral values, patience and compassion during the colonial India.

The story revolves around, Soordas, a blind beggar from Pandepur Basti in Prayagraj who struggles for the acquaintance of his ancestral land with Mr. John Sewak, an industrialist and Mahendra Pratap Singh, the king of Chatari and president of the municipality.

The novel also covers the life account of Mr. John Sewak and his orthodox Christian wife who wants her daughter to follow Christianity, which her daughter Sophia dislikes.

Another character, Vinay, is the prince from a Hindu family, whose mother Rani Jahanvi wants him to sacrifice his life for country, but is lustful towards Sophia. Their religious difference creates a chaos in the society. The novel covers the problems arising due to industrialisation in India.

Various characters such as Soordas, Sophia, Vinay, Bharat Singh, Jahnavi, Mr. Sewak, Prabhu Sewak, and Iswar Sewak represent different emotions of life, such as patriotism, lust, strength, fear, and insecurities.

== Characters ==
=== Main characters ===
==== Soordas ====
Soordas is a blind poor beggar from Pandepur Basti, in Prayag. Much of his character is inspired from Gandhian values, and sometimes is associated with Mahatma Gandhi itself. Soordas has 10 bighas of ancestral land, which is collectively used by whole colony, for either animal feeding or for stay temporarily during plagues and wars. However, Mr. John Sewak, a British Christian industrialist, wants to open a tobacco factory on this land. He tries his best to snatch the land from Soordas. Soordas is involved in many other struggles during his life, such as, from himself, his blindness, his nephew Mithoo, who was raised by Soordas after the demise of his parents, and from the other villagers itself, such as Bhairo, who hates Soordas, and is often at conflict with his wife Subhagi. Subhagi shelters in Soordas' hut to protect herself from her husband's rage, and thus, villagers are often suspicious towards Soordas and Subhagi. Bhairo lit Soordas' hut on fire, which ruins his meagre savings and other belongings. Soordas' character is represented as a struggle of a fragile and poor man, who never renounces righteousness to win, and never disappoints in defeat. A revolt occurs in Pandepur, when Mr. John Sewak ruined the whole settlement for his industry, and during the stampede, Soordas was shot by Mr. Clark, fiancé of Mr. John Sewak's daughter Sophia. Soordas' death at the end, is a remarkable theme and punch event of the novel:

The demise of Soordas triggered widespread city-wide demonstrations, drawing crowds eager to pay homage to the renowned player known for his resilience and sportsmanship. While some praised his perfection, others hailed him as a guardian or even a deity. However, in truth, Surdas epitomized the essence of a virtuous player on life's stage. He harbored no malice, never faltered in courage, and never retreated. Whether victorious or defeated, he maintained an unwavering sense of contentment, harboring no ill will towards his opponents. He adhered strictly to fair play, refraining from any form of manipulation or clandestine harm against his adversaries.

— Premchand, Rangbhoomi, (Translated)

==== Sophia ====
Sophia is the daughter of Mr. John Sewak, a Christian industrialist and his orthodox Catholic wife. Sophia is represented as a liberal and independent girl, always suspecting and criticising the teachings of Christ, though she did not disrespect him. Her criticism of Jesus leads to an argument with her mother Mrs. Sewak, who forces her to leave the house. Sophia seeks shelter in Kunwar Bharat Singh's house, the noble local king, after an accident and has an encounter with her old friend Indu, who was her classmate back in Nainital. Sophia soon turns to be everyone's favourite in house, but soon falls in love with Bharat Singh's son Vinay Singh, who had already sacrificed himself to his nation and people. Sophia learns that Vinay's mother Queen Jahnavi wants Vinay to become a saint-like person, with no luxuries and only pain and suffering, that the nation had gone through. Sophia and Vinay's love soon turns lustful, which Jahnavi learns of and therefore sends Vinay for practice in Rajputana. Jahnavi becomes suspicious of Sophia, and orders her to marry someone else. Mrs. Sewak fixes her marriage with Mr. Clark.
