= Anand Nagar metro station (Mumbai) =

Mumbai Metro's Yellow Line 2A metro station

Anand Nagar
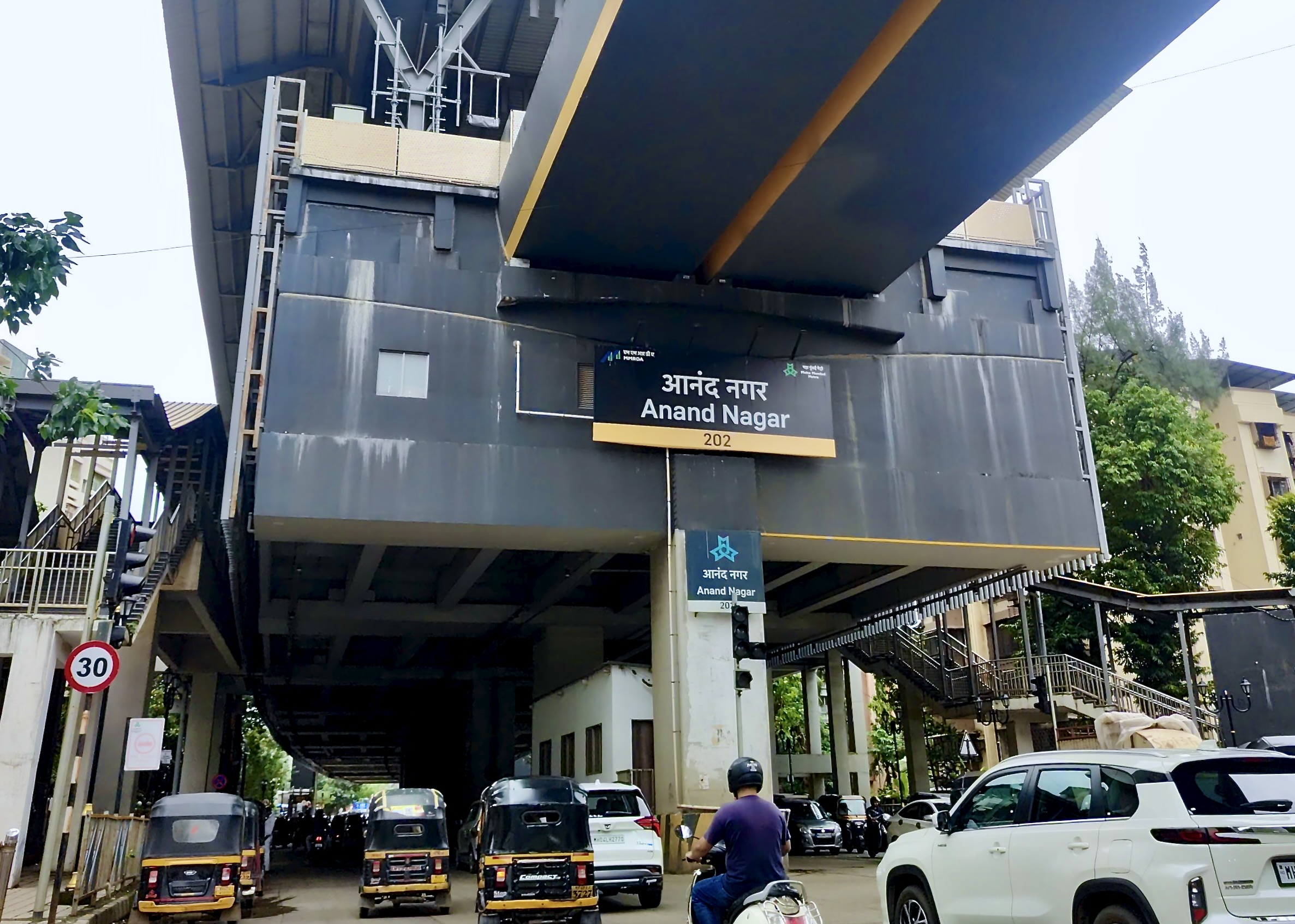
- The elevated Anand Nagar metro station above a busy street with varied traffic.

General information
- Location: Anand Nagar, Dahisar East, Mumbai, Maharashtra 400068
- Coordinates: 19°15′26″N 72°51′54″E
- Owner: Mumbai Metropolitan Region Development Authority
- Operator: Maha Mumbai Metro Operation Corporation Ltd.
- Line: Line 2A
- Platforms: 2 side platforms

Construction
- Structure type: Elevated
- Parking: No

Other information
- Station code: 202

History
- Opened: 2 April 2022; 4 years ago

Services
Preceding station	Mumbai Metro	Following station
Kandarpada towards Andheri (West)	Line 2A	Dahisar (East) Terminus
Route map
Yellow Line
Location

Anand Nagar is an elevated metro station on the North-South corridor of the Yellow Line 2A of Mumbai Metro in Mumbai, India. This metro station is located on New Link Road in Dahisar, Mumbai. This station is managed by the Mumbai Metropolitan Region Development Authority (MMRDA), and was opened to the public on 2 April 2022.

== History ==
J Kumar Infraprojects was awarded the contract to construct the station in June 2016. The MMRDA announced that electrification of the line had been completed on 26 May 2020. The station was originally named Upper Dahisar. The MMRDA renamed the station as Anand Nagar in March 2022 based on demands from local residents.

Anand Nagar was opened to the public on 2 April 2022, along with the first phase of Line 2A.

== Station layout ==
L2	Side platform
L2	Platform 1	towards Dahisar (East) (terminus) →
L2	Platform 2	← towards Andheri (West) (Kandarpada)
L2	Side platform
L1	Mezzanine	Fare control, station agent, Metro Card vending machines, crossover
G	Street level	Exit/Entrance
