= National Highway 128B (India) =

National Highway in India

National Highway 128B
- Map of National Highway 128B in red

Route information
- Auxiliary route of NH 28
- Length: 100 km (62 mi)

Major junctions
- West end: Azamgarh
- East end: Phephna

Location
- Country: India
- States: Uttar Pradesh

Highway system
- Roads in India; Expressways; National; State; Asian
← NH 28	→ NH 31

National Highway 128B, commonly referred to as NH 128B is a national highway in India. It is a secondary route of National Highway 28. NH-128B runs in the state of Uttar Pradesh in India.

== Route ==
NH128B connects Azamgarh, Mau, Teekha and Phephna in the state of Uttar Pradesh.

== Junctions ==
NH 28 Terminal near Azamgarh.
NH 31 Terminal near Phephna.

== See also ==
- List of national highways in India
- List of national highways in India by state
