= Gaban (film) =

- Directed by: Hrishikesh Mukherjee; Krishan Chopra
- Written by: Munshi Premchand (story); Akhtar-Ul-Iman (dialogue)
- Produced by: H. I. Production
- Starring: Sunil Dutt; Sadhna
- Cinematography: K Vaikunth
- Music by: Shankar Jaikishan
- Release date: 1966
- Running time: 169 minutes
- Country: India
- Language: Hindi

Gaban (transl. Embezzlement) is 1966 Hindi film directed by Hrishikesh Mukherjee, based on Munshi Premchand's classic novel by the same name. It had Sunil Dutt and Sadhna playing the lead role. The film has music by Shankar Jaikishan, and lyrics were by Shailendra and Hasrat Jaipuri.

== Plot ==
Honest Munshi Dayanath works in the administrative office of the Allahabad High Court in 1928 British India, and lives an impoverished lifestyle along with his wife, a grown slacker son, Ramanath, and two younger sons. Without knowing Ramanath's background, Munshi Dindayal arranges his daughter, Jalpa's marriage, and she moves in with this family. Unable to pay jeweler Gangaram for jewelry purchased for this wedding, Ramanath steals his wife's jewelry, and then gets in debt when he gets her a Chandrahaar. In order to pay for this, he works as a Clerk, collecting money for the regime as well as accepting bribes. Circumstances compel him to embezzle Rs.800/- which he is unable to return. Afraid of being arrested, he flees to Calcutta, gets embroiled indirectly in the freedom struggle, gets arrested and will only be set free if he testifies against non-violent freedom-fighters.

== Cast ==
- Sunil Dutt as Ramanath
- Sadhna as Jalpa
- Minoo Mumtaz as Zohrajaan
- Badri Prasad as Munshi Dayanath
- Leela Mishra as Jaggo
- Kanhaiyalal as Devideen
- Anwar Hussain as Khan
- C. S. Dubey as Pan Shop Owner
- Pratima Devi as Ramanath's Mother
- Agha as Bade Babu
- Kamal Kapoor as Advocate
- Brahm Bhardwaj as Jalpa's Father
- Zeb Rehman as Ratan
- P Kailash as Senior Inspector

== Soundtrack ==
#	Song	Singer
1	"Main Har Raat Jaagi"	Lata Mangeshkar
2	"Aaye Re Din Sawan Ke"	Lata Mangeshkar
3	"Sajan Le Jayega Tujhko Ghar"	Lata Mangeshkar
4	"Maine Dekha Tha Sapnon Mein"	Lata Mangeshkar
5	"Tum Bin Sajan Barse Nayan"	Lata Mangeshkar, Mohammed Rafi
6	"Sola Singar Karke Aayi Suhaag Raat"	Mohammed Rafi
7	"Ehsan Mere Dil Pe Tumhara Hai Doston"	Mohammed Rafi
