= Lottery (short story) =

- Short story by Premchand
- Original title: लॉटरी
- Country: India
- Language: Hindi
- Genre(s): short story fiction

Publication
- Published in: Zamana, Satsahitya Prakashan
- Publication date: 1933

"Lottery" (Hindi: लॉटरी, Urdu: لاٹری) is a Hindustani short story. It was written by Indian author Premchand. The story is told in narrative form from the perspective of an unnamed school teacher. The story has been adapted into play format, with theatrical performances presented by Lalit Parimoo's Natsamaj Theatre Group, as well as Mujeeb Khan's Ideal Drama and Entertainment Academy.

== Synopsis ==
"Lottery", is told in the first person, from the perspective of a school teacher, his friend Vikram, and Vikram's extended family. The teacher and Vikram discuss the lottery and speculate over their actions if either were to win a prize worth ten lakhs of Indian rupees. Vikram states that if he were to win the lottery, he would take a trip around the world, in order to study the traditions and religions of different countries, and establish a public library, offering the world's finest books. The teacher states that he would save the money, in return for the interest. As the story unfolds, Vikram realises that he lacks the funds to purchase a ticket, and approaches the teacher with the suggestion that they pool their funds and buy a ticket together. The teacher and Vikram each raise five rupees to buy the ticket, agreeing to divide the winnings, much to the dismay of Vikram's family who is suspicious of the teacher's motive.

Vikram purchases the ticket in his name, the teacher and his friend purchase theirs, and Vikram's father, Bade Thakur Sahib, uncle Chhote Thakur Sahib (real brother of Vikram's father), and elder brother (Prakash) also each buy tickets. They begin to fight over what they would do if any of them were to win. As the lottery drawing approaches, the teacher realises that he had not signed an agreement with Vikram acknowledging that they had gone into a partnership to purchase a ticket with the intention of sharing any money won, and relies on Vikram's honesty. Family arguments escalate, involving heated threats. Vikram's brother Prakash arrives home with injuries to his head and hand. When his father asks him what has happened, he explains that he had gone to Jhakkar Baba, who has the power to grant wishes. Prakash shares with his family that before Jhakkar Baba grants wishes, he tests them by throwing rocks at them. While most visitors run away, those that withstand the attack will have their wishes granted. When Prakash survived the stoning, he was assured that he would be the sole winner of the lottery. However, much to everyone's despair, when the winner of the lottery is announced, it is a man from America who is found to have bought the winning ticket. The plot is a dramatic irony, with the story ending with plot twist and a moral message.

== Compilations and adaptations ==
"Lottery" appears in Indian textbooks and in compilations of moral education books. It is included in a compilation of Premchand's writing, entitled The Premchand Reader, Selected Stories 2, as translated and adapted by Anupa Lal. The story has also been adapted into several plays, and was performed by Lalit Parimoo's Natsamaj Theatre Group and Mujeeb Khan's Ideal Drama and Entertainment Academy.
