= Anand Nagar =

- city
- Location in Assam, India Anand Nagar (India)
- Coordinates: 26.226°N 90.220°E
- Country: India
- State: Assam
- District: Dhubri

Population (2011)
  - Total: 2,050

Languages
  - Official: Assamese
- Time zone: UTC+5:30 (IST)
- Vehicle registration: AS

Anand Nagar is a census town in Dhubri district in the state of Assam, India.

== Demographics ==
As of 2011 India census, Anand Nagar had a population of 2050. Males constitute 50.7% of the population and females 49.3%. Anand Nagar has an average literacy rate of 69.17%, lower than the state average of 72.19%; with 74.7% of the males and 63.5% of female's literate. 15.5% of the population is under 6 years of age.
