= Godaan =

1936 novel by Munshi Premchand

- Godaan cover page
- Author: Munshi Premchand
- Original title: Godaan (गोदान)
- Language: Hindi
- Genre: Fiction
- Publication date: 1936
- Publication place: India
- Media type: Print (hardback & paperback)
- ISBN: 0-948924-07-1
- OCLC: 17509087
- Dewey Decimal: 891.433
- LC Class: PK2098.S7 G613x 1987
- Original text: Godaan (गोदान) at Hindi Wikisource

Godaan (Hindi: गोदान, Urdu: گودان, romanized: gōdān, lit. 'cow donation') is a Hindi novel by Munshi Premchand. It was the last completed novel by Premchand. It was first published in 1936 and is considered one of the greatest novels of modern Indian literature and literary experts consider it world-class rivaling to classical literature of west. Themed around the socio-economic deprivation as well as the exploitation of the village poor, the novel was the last complete novel of Premchand. It follows the story of an old poor farmer, stuck in a debt trap, who wants to purchase a cow, but is unable to do so for lack of money. It was translated into English in 1957 by Jai Ratan and Purushottama Lal as The Gift of a Cow. A 1968 translation by Gordon C. Roadarmel is now considered "a classic in itself".

Godaan was made into a Hindi film in 1963, starring Raaj Kumar, Kamini Kaushal, Mehmood and Shashikala. In 2004, Godaan was part of the 27-episode TV series, Tehreer.... Munshi Premchand Ki, [The Writings of Munshi Premchand] based on the writing of Premchand, starring Pankaj Kapur and Surekha Sikri, directed by Gulzar and produced by Doordarshan.

== Plot ==
The story revolves around various characters representing different sections of the Indian community. Hori Mahato's family represents the rural and peasant society. His family includes his wife Dhania, daughters Rupa and Sona, son Gobar, and daughter-in-law Jhunia. The story begins with Hori's desire to own a cow, like many other poor peasants. He purchases a cow from Bhola, a cowherd, on a debt of 80 rupees.

Envious of Hori, his younger brother, Heera, poisons the cow and flees out of fear of police action. When the police arrive to inquire about the cow's death, Hori takes a loan and bribes the police to clear his younger brother's name. Jhunia, Bhola's widowed daughter, elopes with Gobar after becoming pregnant by him. Fearing the reaction of the villagers, Gobar too runs away to the town. Hori and Dhania are reluctant to drive away Jhunia as she is carrying their son's child; they decide to accept her as their daughter-in-law and offer her shelter. The village panchayat fines Hori for sheltering Jhunia, after a personal attack by the Pandit. Hori again is compelled to take a loan and pay the penalty.

Hori accumulates a huge debt from local money lenders and is eventually forced to marry off his daughter Rupa for a mere 200 rupees to save his ancestral land from auction due to unpaid land tax. However, his determination to repay those 200 rupees and get a cow to provide milk for his grandson leads to his death from overwork

In Godaan, Hori epitomizes the downtrodden peasant - a victim of his circumstances, possessing both faults and virtues. Throughout the hardships he endures, Hori stays true to his values and duties. The novel concludes with Hori's death and the bittersweet legacy he leaves behind, defined by fulfilled and unfulfilled dreams, thus providing a moving finale.

== Characters ==
- Hori is a peasant from the village of Belari. He is married to Dhania and has two daughters and a son: Sona, Rupa, and Govardhan, respectively. He is depicted as an up-righteous man and struggles throughout his life to preserve his up-righteousness. He is the eldest among his two brothers and following the parents' death, he takes it upon himself to look after them, often times sacrificing the interests of his own family. This is one of the recurring sources of tension in his marriage. Upon the death of his cow, he bribes the police to prevent them from searching Heera's house. He feels orphaned to be out of the community and hence accepts the penalty levied by the panchayat when Gobar brings home a low-caste girl. Similarly, he allows Bhola to take his ox away as he is neither able to pay the cost of it nor willing expel Jhunia from his house. They have accepted her as their daughter-in-law and her child as their grandchild. He is kind and generous. He gives shelter to Seliya, a cobbler's daughter who is exploited by Matadin, a Brahmin, and is shirked by her own people.
- Dhania is Hori's wife. She is bold and fiery and cannot tolerate injustice. She raises her voice against injustice, against the wishes of Hori and irritates him. She is vexed when Hori puts up with much oppression from the money lenders and the Brahmin priest. Hori, though he beats her at times for disobeying him, knows that her arguments are correct. She makes him see the truth and the reality of facts. Unlike him, she is not lost in rigmarole of clichés and ideals. She stands by what she thinks is correct and her dharma, rather than the traditional principles of the community. She knowingly accepts into her household, a low-caste girl, as her daughter-in-law. She does not blame only Jhunia for placing them in an embarrassing position. She knows that her son, Gobar, is equally responsible. She is a loving mother. She even takes care of Heera's children when necessary, she willingly accommodates and shelters the pregnant Seliya, the cobbler's daughter. Dhania has never known a life of peace and comfort, as throughout the novel we see her struggling along with her husband for a livelihood. She is strong and irrespective of caste or creed helps the needy.
- Gobar is the only son of Dhania and Hori. Born into a poor family, he aspires for a life of comfort. Though initially a simpleton like his father, he gets exposure in the city, Lucknow, and learns to be practical and worldly wise. He impregnates Jhunia, Bhola's daughter, and lacking courage to face the wrath of the villagers, flees to the city, leaving Jhunia at his parents' doorstep. His insensitive hasty behaviour creates trouble for Hori, who pays the penalty. Gobar works for Mirza Kurshed, but creates his own business. He also lends money to other people. When he comes to the village dressed as a gentleman with pump shoes, on a short visit, he is unrecognised with difficulty. He becomes the centre of attraction in the village, the other young men are tempted to go to the city seeing him. He promises to get them jobs. Upon learning that Datadin is exploiting his father, he advises his father to come out of the shackles of traditional bindings. He organises a function and with his friends enacts a skit to expose and satirise the mean mentality of the village money lenders and the Brahmin priest. He threatens to drag the priest to court and has a fight with his father on this issue. He realises that Hori is too simple, god-fearing and cannot go against his dharma. Angrily, he leaves the village with his wife Jhunia and returns to the city. His weakness for liquour and short tempered nature affects his relation with Jhunia. He realises his mistake only when his devoted wife nurses him during his illness. He works in the sugar factory and later becomes the gardener at Malathi's house.
- Datadin is the village Brahmin priest and a greedy moneylender. It is ironic that this man with low standards goes about the village policing the wrongs of the other villagers. He penalises Hori for accepting and sheltering a low-caste girl, Jhunia, as their daughter-in-law. He is a hypocrite and is blind to the fact that his own son Mataddin is having an affair with Seliya, a cobbler's daughter. He invites pundits from Varanasi to perform the purifying rituals of his defiled son so that he is brought into the mainstream of Brahmanism. He does not pity Hori's poverty, rather takes advantage of his goodness and exploits him.
- Matadin is the son of the Brahmin priest Datadin. He is young and has an affair with Seliya, a low-caste woman who works on the farm for him. The villagers know about it. Seliya does not have entrance to his house. Her parents and relatives hopefully wait for her to be accepted by him. Finally, they decide to punish him and beat him and put a piece of bone into his mouth—a taboo for the Brahmins. But Seliya saves him. Matadin becomes an outcast in his own house. His father performs purifying rituals to bring him back to the mainstream of Brahmanism. He spends a lot of money on the rituals and pundits from Kashi are called in. Matadin's malarial fever which had taken him to death's door has made him realise his mistake in exploiting Selia. When Matadin discovers that he has a son from Seliya, he longs to see the child and goes on the sly in her absence. He is repentant and sends her two rupees through Hori. He realises that he is bound by duty to Seliya and his son. He removes his holy thread and thus liberates himself from the shackles of Brahmanism. Now, he is free to live courageously with Seliya as his wife.
- Bhola is a cowherd of the neighbouring village. He is a widower and has two married sons and a young widowed daughter, Jhunia. Bhola agrees to give Hori a cow on loan and in turn Hori promises to find a companion for him to remarry. Bhola is very upset when his daughter elopes with Hori's son Gobar. He comes to Hori's house on vengeance and demands that he pay back the loan to him. Hori does not have the money. Bhola threatens to take his oxen away, that would reduce Hori to a labourer. When Hori pleads with him, Bhola asks him to kick out Jhunia from his household. This is not agreeable to Hori and Bhola takes away his oxen.
- Heera is Hori's younger brother. He is married to Punia, whose bellicose nature makes him split from Hori. He assumes that Hori stashed away the inheritance upon their parents death, and when Hori borrows the cow from Bhola, he's suspicion is further reinforced, as he thinks that Hori bought the cow using the money from their inheritance. Fueled by envy and resentment, he poisons the cow. Fearing the allegation of cow slaughter, he absconds the village. In the end of the novel, he returns home, disheveled and poor, and asks Hori for forgiveness.
- Punia is Heera's wife, is suspicious of Hori and his family and believes that they stashed away the inheritance. She is often found pitting her husband against them by making this allegation. However, in the later part of the novel, following her husband's flight, she has a change of heart when Hori helps her in her misfortune.
- Shobha is the youngest brother of Hori. He is unmarried.
- Chuhia is the neighbor of Gobar in the city, who is a close friend of Jhuniya. She takes care of Jhuniya and Gobar's son.
- Rai Sahib has won the local elections twice. He wanted to marry his daughter off to a rich zamindar to again win in the election and claim the property of his in-laws. Thus, he married his daughter off to another rich, widower and rake zamindar. He claimed and won the zamindari of his in-laws. He won the election and became the municipal minister. But when he planned to get his son married to the daughter of Raja Suryankant for his family's prestige, his son refused that. He is in love with Saroj, the younger sister of Malati Devi. They both married and went away to London. His son claimed and won the entire property Rai Sahib won from in-laws leaving Rai Sahib in huge debt. His daughter got divorced. This eventually left Rai Sahib too dissatisfied despite all his efforts.
- Ms. Malati is a physician educated at Oxford. She is one of the three daughters of Mr. Kaul. She is the centre of attentiona at parties. Mr. Khanna flirts with her and she is envied and disliked by Govindi. Malati in turn falls in love with Mr. Mehta because of his ideology, his simplicity and intelligence. She starts serving the poor and gets involved in many social activities. After seeing the change in Malati, Mr. Mehta falls in love with Malati. But though Malati loves Mr. Mehta, she refuses his marriage proposal. She now wants to serve the poor and does not want to marry. Mr. Mehta and Malati together serve the poor and needy. Malati is the only character shown as contented at the end of the novel because of her commitment to charitable deeds.
- Mr. Mehta is a scholar and lectures philosophy in a college. He is also authoring a book on philosophy which he dedicates to Malati. Malati and Govindi are two characters who are influenced by him. Govindi finds solace talking to him as he appreciates her concept of womanhood. He needs the guidance of Malati as he has mismanaged his funds and income in over-generously serving the poor.
- Mr. Khanna is an industrialist and owns a sugar factory. Though married and father of three children, he disrespects his wife Govindi for her traditional values. He flirts with Malati. Govindi is fed up of his behaviour and leaves him. He exploits the labour class. It is only when his sugar factory is destroyed in a fire accident and Govindi stands by him encouraging him to set it up once again, does he realise his mistake. Mr. Khanna eventually starts loving his wife.
- Govindi is Mr. Khanna's wife, the rich industrialist, and is epitomised as an ideal Hindu wife. She is virtuous and very tolerant ofher husband and children. Mr. Khanna is uninterested in her as he finds fault with her traditional values. He takes interest in Miss Malati and flirts with her. Govindi is desperately dejected and decides to abandon him and his house. But it is Mr. Mehta, who has always been appreciative of her ideals, who advises her to return to the children. She is a moral support to her husband when his sugar factory gets destroyed in fire. It is she who encourages him to set it up again.
- Mirza Saheb is a good and jovial person. When Gobar comes to the city, he first works as a gardener at Mirza Saheb's place.

== Themes ==
The novel has several themes:

1. Problems due to caste segregation: People of different vocation and their respective castes represent the village. Datadin, the Brahmin priest represents the uppermost caste; he exploits the lower caste villagers with his various religious sanctions. Hori [peasant], Bhola [cowherd], Seliya [a cobbler's daughter] represent the various hierarchies of lower castes in the caste system that exists in India.
2. Exploitation of the lower class: Premchand has drawn a realistic picture of the poor peasants exploited by the village zamindar and the greedy moneylenders. The zamindars collected the revenue and imposed fine. Here, Rai Saheb fined Hori for the death of the cow, though he did not kill it. The peasants are unable to pay the debts in time and it gets multiplied with the passage of time. They are caught in a debt trap and they suffer, like Hori, until their end. The author is advocating the need to end the feudal system that existed in the country.
3. Exploitation of women: the women characters Dhania, Jhunia, Seliya and Roopa are exploited by the men they love.
4. Problems due to industrialisation: Industrialists who exploit labourers, migration of youngsters from the villages to cities, and conflicts in cities.
5. Interpersonal relationships, Love, and marriage: Premchand as a progressive writer envisages a modern India where love and inter-caste marriages would thrive. We have the inter-caste marriages of Gobar and Jhunia, Mataadin and Seeliya and that of the educated pair, Rudra Pratap and Saroj. The marital relationship of Mr. Khanna and his wife is strained as he lacks love and respect for her. Mr. Mehta and Miss Malati have serious thought provoking discussions on the issues of love, the institution of marriage, the relation of man and woman and womanhood. They represent the voice of modern India and mutually decide to live as friends serving society in their respective capacities.
6. Political scenario of the period: The country was fighting for its liberation from colonial powers. It was the period for the growth and development of different parties and ideologies. Premchand, through the novel, expresses his stand as a socialist. Socialism is a panacea for all kinds of discrimination and exploitation.

The narrative represents the average Indian farmer's existence under colonial rule, with the protagonist facing cultural and feudal exploitation. It shows how the life of these characters takes shape.

== Families in Godaan ==
=== Rural Families ===
==== Mehto Family ====
- (Unnamed parents of Hori)
  - Hori m. Dhania
    - Gobar m. Jhunia
      - Chunnu (deceased)
      - Mangal
    - Sona m. Mathuradas
    - Roopa m. Ramsewak
  - Heera m. Punia (Punni)
  - Shobha

==== Datadeen's family ====
- Datadeen
  - Matadeen m. Siliya
    - Ramu

==== Bhola's family ====
- Bhola m. (Unnamed wife)
  - Jangi
  - Kamta
  - Jhunia m. Gobar
    - Chunnu (deceased)
    - Mangal
- Bhola m. Nehri

=== Urban Families ===
==== Raisahab's family ====
- Raisahab Amarpal Singh
  - Minakshi m. Digvijay Singh
  - Rudrapal m. Saroj

==== Mr. Khanna's family ====
- Mr. Khanna m. Govindi
  - Bhishma

==== Kaul's family ====
- Mr. Kaul (Kaul Saab)
  - Ms. Malti
  - Saroj m. Rudrapal
  - Varda

== Legacy ==
Godaan is regarded as an enduring Hindi-language cult-classic work by Premchand. Like his other novels, Godaan too depicts the social struggles of the lower class.

Godaan was made into a Hindi film in 1963, starring Raaj Kumar, Kamini Kaushal, Mehmood and Shashikala. In 2004, Godaan was part of the 27-episode TV series, Tehreer.... Munshi Premchand Ki, based on the writing of Premchand, starring Pankaj Kapur and Surekha Sikri, directed by Gulzar and produced by Doordarshan.

Godaan is an indispensable part of Indian literature. It is regarded as one of the finest work ever written in an Indian language.

This novel was translated into 'The gift of Cow' by Jai Ratan and Purushottama Lal.
