= Lamhi =

Village in India

- Village
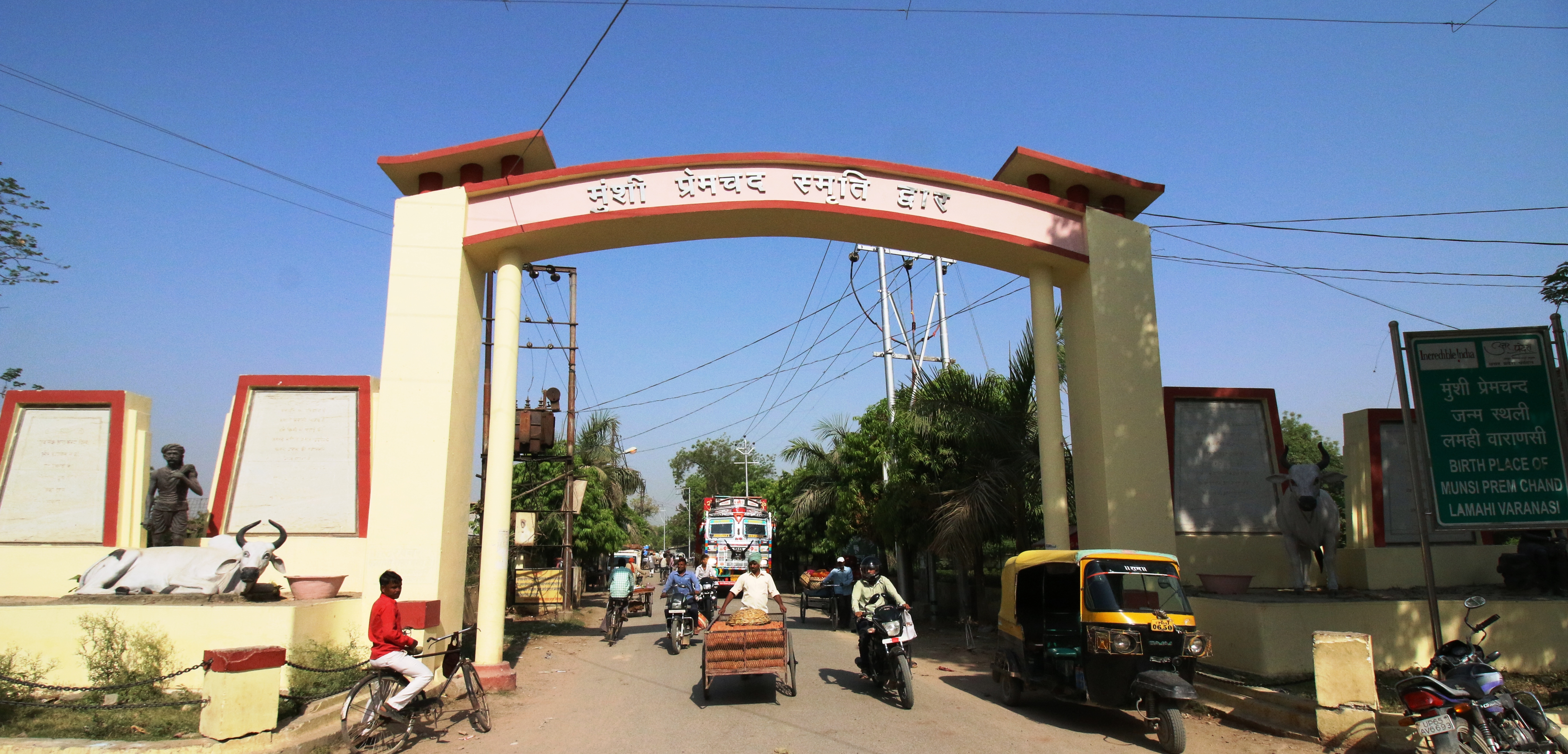
- Munshi Premchand Memorial Gate, Lamhi, Varanasi

- Village location on Varanasi district map
- Coordinates: 25°22′41.79″N 82°59′38.63″E
- Country: India
- State: Uttar Pradesh
- Elevation: 82.00 m (269.03 ft)

Population (2011)
  - Total: 1,841

Languages
  - Official: Hindi
- Time zone: UTC+5:30 (IST)
- Postal code: 221007
- Vehicle registration: UP65 XX XXXX

Lamhi or Lamahi is a village, and gram panchayat, just north of the holy city of Varanasi in the Indian state of Uttar Pradesh. The renowned Hindi and Urdu writer Munshi Premchand was born here on 31 July 1880.

There are two villages in the Lamahi Gram Panchayat: Lamahi with a population of 1,841 (2011) and Banwaripur with a population of 764 (2011).

In 2016, Banaras Hindu University established its "Munshi Prem Chandra Memorial Research Institute and Study Centre" in Lamhi.

== Transport ==
=== Road ===
Lamahi is connected to Varanasi and Azamgarh by National Highway 28, a two-lane highway. There is a proposed ring road for Varanasi that would pass near to Lamhi.

=== Airport ===
The nearest airport, Lal Bahadur Shastri International Airport, is 20 km away from Lamhi.

=== Rail ===
The nearest railway station is Varanasi Junction which is situated on the Howrah–Delhi main line. The station is 9 km away from Lamhi.

== Points of interest ==
- Munshi Premchand Monument and Memorial Park
- Munshi Premchand Smriti Dwar (Munshi Premchand Memorial Gate)
- Munshi Premchand Sarovar
- Lamahi Ram-Reela
- Har Har Mahadev Temple
- Lamahi Post office
- Kashi Temple
- Premchand's photo of torn shoes

== Notable individuals ==
- Munshi Premchand
