= Menhdawal =

- Town
- Location in Uttar Pradesh, India Menhdawal (India)
- Coordinates: 26°59′N 83°07′E
- Country: India
- State: Uttar Pradesh
- District: Sant Kabir Nagar

Population (2011)
  - Total: 27,897

Languages
  - Official: Hindi-Urdu
- Time zone: UTC+5:30 (IST)
- Vehicle registration: UP-58
- Website: http://sknagar.nic.in/mehd.html

Menhdawal is a town and a nagar panchayat in Sant Kabir Nagar district in the Indian state of Uttar Pradesh.

== Demographics ==
As of 2011 India census Mehndawal had a population of 27,897. Males constituted 14,390 of the population and females 13,507. Mehndawal has an average literacy rate of 66.84% lower than state average of 67.68%. Male literacy is 75.04% and female literacy is 58.17%. In Mehndawal 16.26% of the population is under 6 years of age.
