= Dohrighat =

Doharighat
- Town
- Location in Uttar Pradesh, India
- Coordinates: 26.26°N 83.52°E
- Country: India
- State: Uttar Pradesh
- District: Mau
- Elevation: 66 m (217 ft)

Population (2001)
  - Total: 10,245

Languages Spoken : Hindi English and Bhojpuri
  - Official: Hindi
- Time zone: UTC+5:30 (IST)
- Postal code: 275303

Dohrighat is a town and a nagar panchayat in the Mau district of the Indian state of Uttar Pradesh.

== Transport ==
The nearest railway station available is Dohrighat railway station. This city is connected by NH29 route and is between Gorakhpur and Varanasi.

== Geography ==
Dohrighat is located at 26.26°N 83.52°E. It has an average elevation of 66 metres (216 feet).

== Dohrighat Canal ==
The head canal built in Dohrighat is the second large pump canal in Asia and is named after the former Indian PM, Chaudhary Charan Singh.

== Demographics ==
As of 2011 India's population census, Doharighat had a population of 11,799. Males constitute 52% of the population and females 48%. Doharighat has an average literacy rate of 76.50%, higher than the state average of 67.68 % which includes male literacy rate of 82.43% and, female literacy rate of 70.24%. In Dohrighat, 13.92% of the population is between 0 – 6 years of age.
