= National Highway 28 (India) =

National highway in India

National Highway 28

Route information
- Length: 305 km (190 mi)

Major junctions
- North end: NH52 in Kakrahwa, Uttar Pradesh
- List: NH 730 in Naugarh, Uttar Pradesh; NH 27 in Basti, Uttar Pradesh; NH 227A in Kalwari, Uttar Pradesh; NH 128 in Tanda, Uttar Pradesh; NH 328A in Nyori, Uttar Pradesh; NH 128B in Azamgarh, Uttar Pradesh; NH 128A in Mohammadpur, Uttar Pradesh; NH 731 in Chandwak, Uttar Pradesh
- South end: NH 31 in Varanasi, Uttar Pradesh

Location
- Country: India

Highway system
- Roads in India; Expressways; National; State; Asian
← NH 27	→ NH 29

National Highway 28 (NH 28) is a National Highway in India. This highway runs entirely in the state of Uttar Pradesh. It provides main connectivity form India to Nepal.

== Route ==
Kakrahwa on India-Nepal border, Siddharthnagar, Bansi, Rudhauli, Basti, Tanda, Atraulia, Azamgarh, Katghar, Lalganj, Lamhi, Varanasi.

== Districts ==
Siddharthnagar, Basti, Ambedkar Nagar, Azamgarh, Varanasi.
