= Alfred Fisher =

Alfred Fisher may refer to:

- Alfred Fisher (rugby league) (c. 1924–1986), English rugby league footballer
- Alfred Hugh Fisher (1867–1945), British painter, etcher, photographer and writer

== See also ==
- Alfred Fischer (disambiguation)
