= Christ Church, Tiruchirappalli =

Church in Tiruchirappalli district, Tamil Nadu, India

Coordinates: 10.829223°N 78.694395°E

Christ Church is the oldest English church in the town of Tiruchirappalli. It is situated to the north of the famous Teppakulam tank.
