= Alfred Fischer =

Alfred Fischer may refer to:

- Alfred Fischer (architect) (1881–1950), German architect
- Alfred Fischer (judge) (1919–2004), German judge
- Alfred Fischer (botanist) (1858–1913), German botanist
- Alfred Fischer (rower) (born 1960), Swiss Olympic rower
- Alfred Fischer (SS officer) (1907–1945), German Waffen-SS officer
- Alfred G. Fischer (1920–2017), German-American geologist

== See also ==
- Alfred Fisher (disambiguation)
