= Trichy Teppakulam =

Neighbourhood in Tiruchirapalli district, Tamil Nadu, India

Coordinates: 10°49′39″N 78°41′38″E

Teppakulam is a locality near the centre of the Indian city of Tiruchirappalli in Tiruchirappalli district. It is a busy commercial place. It consists of a large artificial tank surrounded by bazaars, prominent among which is a flower market. It contains the Thayumanavar Temple and the Sri Naganathar Swamy Temple, the St. Joseph College Church and Holy Cross Church, and Srimathi Indira Gandhi College for Women. The historic Rockfort is situated nearby. Holy Cross College is located at Teppakulam. The Teppam Floating Festival is held here on boats in January or February and it is a common time and place for marriages.
