= Alfred Hugh Fisher =

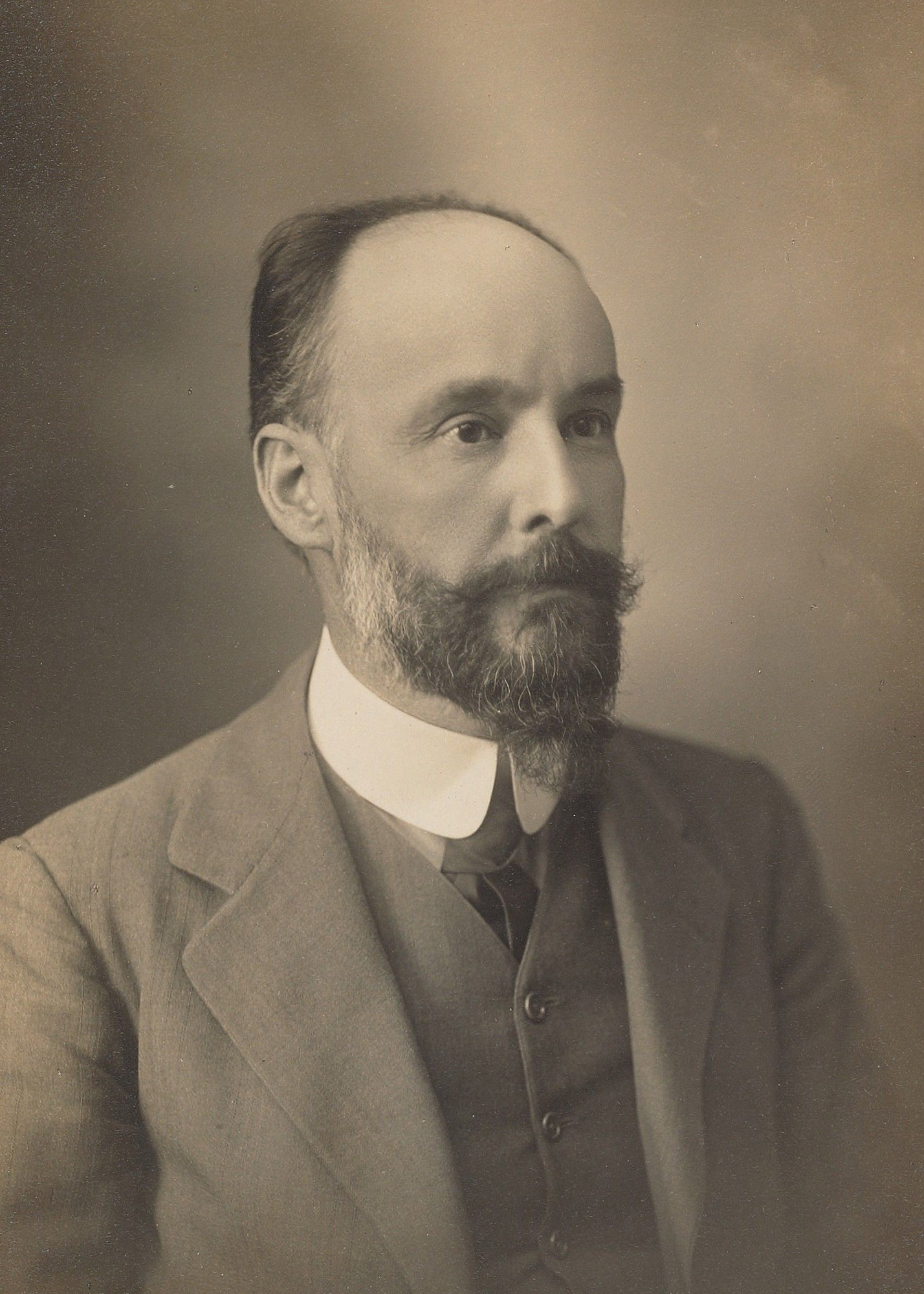
- Fisher in 1910.
- Born: 8 February 1867; London, England
- Died: 2 July 1945 (aged 78)
- Occupations: Artists, Photographer, Writer
- Known for: Painting, Printmaking, Photography, Writing
- Spouse: Lillias Cecile Wyman (m. 1909–1930)
- Parents: Alfred George Fisher (father); Isabella Fayle Smith (mother)

Alfred Hugh Fisher (8 February 1867 – 2 July 1945) was a British painter, etcher, photographer and writer. He was selected by the Colonial Office Visual Instruction Committee to travel around the British Empire and produce illustrative material for their lecture series. He published a travelogue about his travels through Sri Lanka, India and Myanmar, subsequently working as an illustrator for The Illustrated London News. He also authored several books of poetry and works for children.

== Biography ==
Alfred Hugh Fisher was born in Brixton, London, on February 8, 1867, the son of Alfred George Fisher and Isabella Read Smith Fisher. He was educated at the City of London School and University College, and subsequently obtained a role as a junior clerk for an advertising agency called George Street & Company in 1884. Fisher first exhibited his artwork in the Royal Academy exhibition of 1887, a watercolour called Still Waters, Surrey. After 9 years working in the City, Fisher pursued a career as an artist, studying at Lambeth School of Art and South Kensington School of Art before working under Laurens and Constant in Paris for six months. Fisher was elected to membership in the Royal Society of Painters and Etchers in 1898.

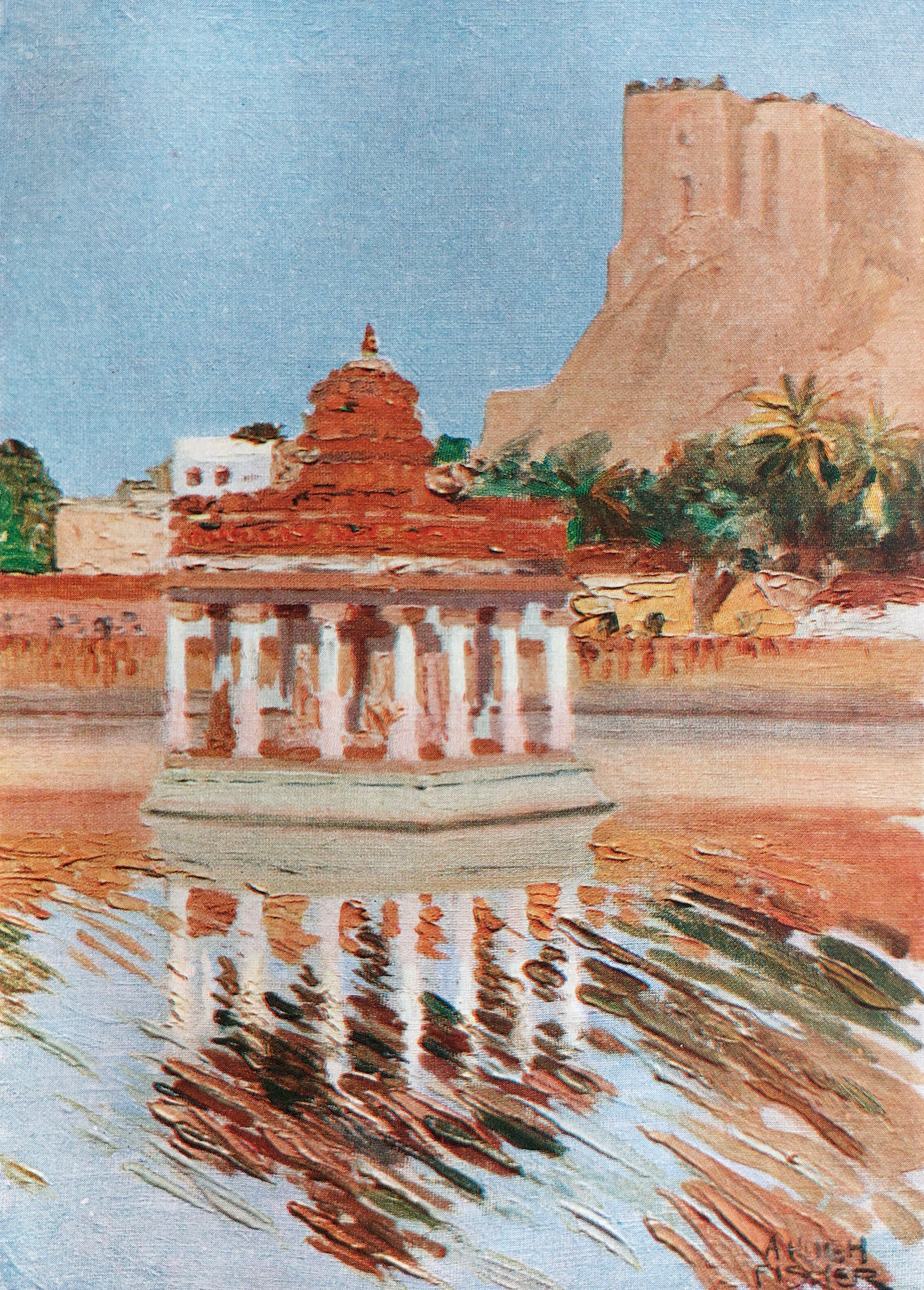
The Sacred Tank and The Rock, Trichinopoly (Original Caption)

On 29 July 1907, Fisher was selected from 10 applicants to become the Colonial Office Visual Instruction Committee's (COVIC) Artist, tasked with creating the visual material required to illustrate the committee's planned lecture series. His appointment, initially for a period of up to three years, commenced from 1 September at a salary of £25 a month, plus traveling and subsistence allowance. Fisher worked under the direction of Halford Mackinder, who was paid £300 for his oversight of the project, and provided Fisher with detailed instructions on what was required. Mackinder asked Fisher to focus on the educational aspect of the images, rather than photographic aesthetic, in capturing the 'native characteristics of the country' and the committee also wanted to highlight what they considered to be the 'super-added characteristics’ of British rule. It was also suggested that he give a feeling of life and movement where possible by including people engaged in everyday activities. Without previous photographic experience, Fisher was provided with training at a fee of 5 guineas for 10 lessons.

Setting off on his initial journey in October 1907, over a period of around eight months Fisher's travels included Sri Lanka, India, Myanmar and Pakistan, followed by Aden, Somaliland and Cyprus as he returned to the UK in 1908. In July 1908 Fisher set off on a second journey, first to Canada, and onto British Weihaiwei, Singapore, Borneo and Hong Kong, returning to the UK through Canada again in March 1909. In the summer of 1909, Mary of Teck, patron to COVIC, approved the funds to renew and improve Fisher's photographic equipment, which he then spent six weeks travelling around the UK to get used to whilst capturing British scenes. Whilst in the UK, Fisher also married Lillias Cecile Wyman in 1909, before setting out on his third expedition, which included Gibraltar, Malta, South Africa, New Zealand, Australia, Tonga and Fiji. The funds for Fisher's COVIC work ran out in 1910, and he returned to the UK.

Whilst the goals of COVIC were primarily to generate propaganda relating to the British Empire, Fisher's journals and unused photographs reveal information about imperial citizens that the published outputs of COVIC worked to obscure. Fisher had a convivial relationship with those employed locally as his servants, and he recalled many anecdotes in his book Through India and Burmah with Pen and Brush (1911) relating to a man called Tambusami, who was from Tamil Nadu.

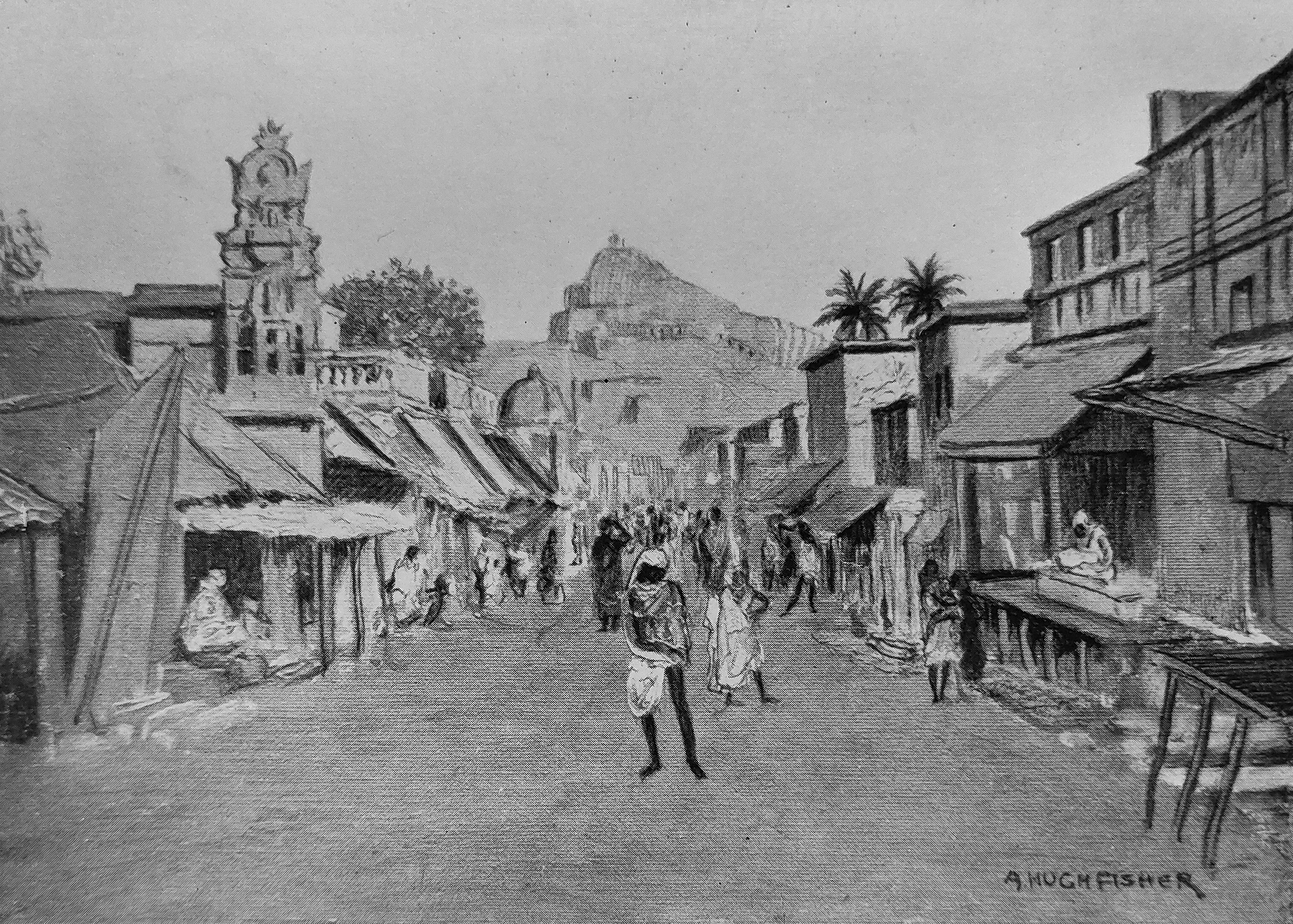
The Main Bazaar, Trichinopoly (Original Caption)

Following his work for COVIC, the Fishers lived on Hammersmith Terrace, London, where Fisher spent much of his time writing and working as an illustrator for The Illustrated London News. By the end of the First World War, the Fishers had settled in Amberley. Fisher dedicated a number of etchings, including personal Christmas Cards, to Campbell Dodgson, which were subsequently bequeathed by him to the British Museum. Fisher also wrote book reviews, under the pseudonym Caleb Reade, for the New York Evening Post Literary Review in order to supplement his income. When Gyula (Julius) Komjati (1894–1958) was working in England in 1927, he and Fisher became friends. As a result, Fisher spent three months in Hungary and Czechoslovakia in 1932. During the Second World War, Fisher's apartment in Tavistock Road, London, was directly bombed. Anticipating this, Fisher had moved to the country and much of his artwork was saved, having been sent away for preservation to Herbert Faulkner West (b. 1898 – d. 1974), a Professor of Comparative Literature at Dartmouth College with whom he had built a friendship via correspondence, and who Fisher hoped might write his biography.

During his lifetime Fisher maintained a broad circle of friends and correspondents, including Lascelles Abercrombie, John Taylor Arms, William Rose Benét, Laurence Binyon, Gordon Bottomley, Walter de la Mare, Julius Komjáti (printmaker), James Norman Hall, Oscar Levy, May Morris, A. E.(George Russell), and Thomas Sturge Moore. He was a member of the Chicago Society of Etchers and the California Print Makers, and he exhibited at the Royal Academy, the Royal Society of British Arts (RBA) and with the Royal Engravers.

Having suffered a stroke, Alfred Hugh Fisher died on 2 July 1945.

== Publications ==
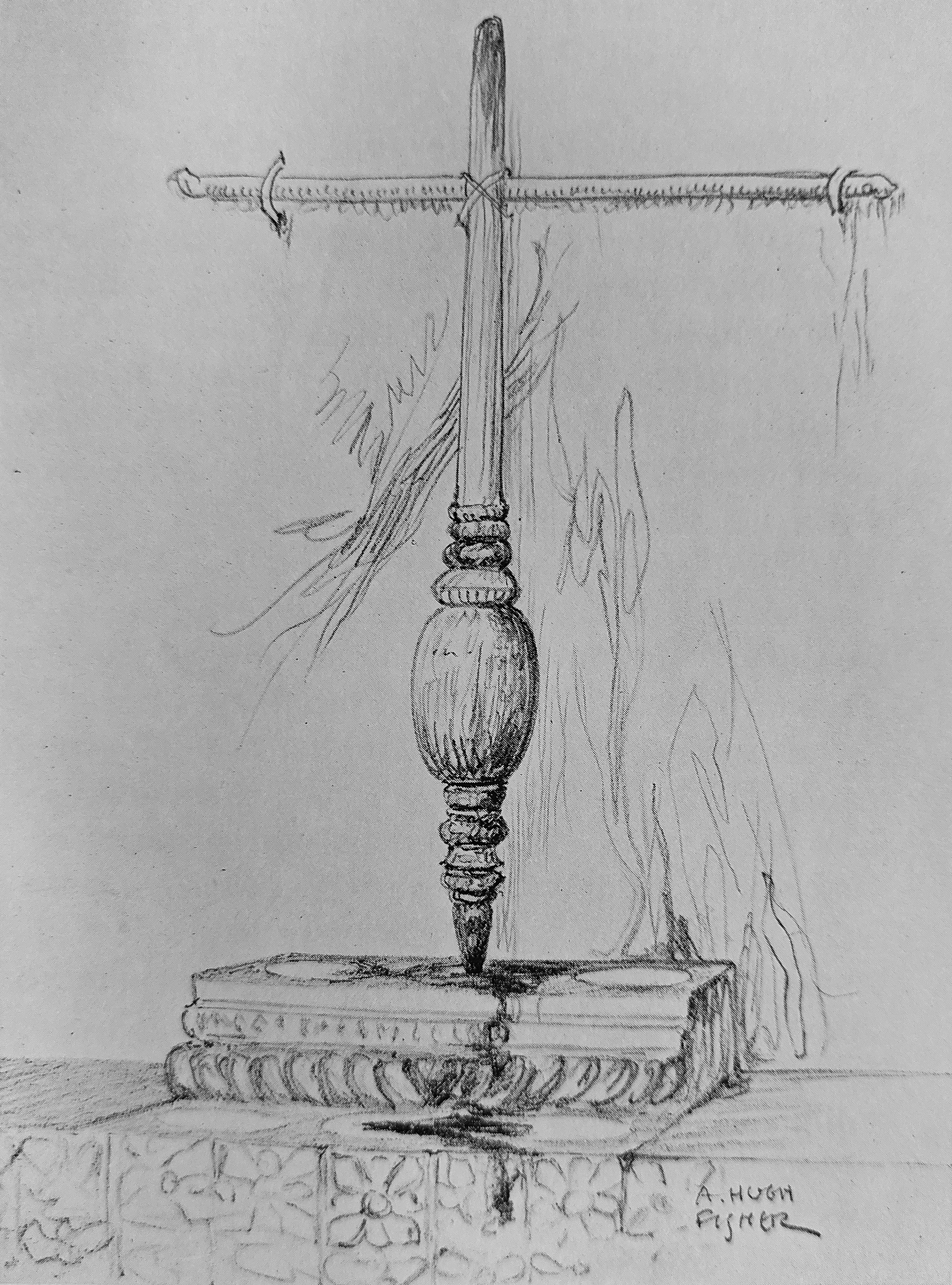
Karapanasami, The Black God (Original Title)

Fisher was noted for the following publications in Who Was Who 1941–1950.

- The Cathedral Church of Hereford (1898)
- Yule's Book I (1902)
- Through India and Burmah with Pen and Brush (1911)
- Poems (1913)
- The Marriage of Ilario (1919)
- The Ruined Barn, and other Poems (1921)
- Frolics with Uncle Yule (1928)
- Quix (1931)
- Callisto (a poem) (1934)
- Jemshid in Exile and other poems (1935)
