= Colonial Office Visual Instruction Committee =

The Colonial Office Visual Instruction Committee (COVIC) was a scheme by the British Colonial Office to publish lantern-slide lectures about the British Empire.

Established in 1902 by Joseph Chamberlain, the original Members of the Committee were Reginald Brabazon, 12th Earl of Meath, Cecil Clementi Smith, Halford Mackinder, Robert Davies Roberts, Michael Sadler (Department for Education, the Board of Education at the time), John Struthers (Scottish Education Secretary), and Charles Prestwood Lucas.

COVIC hired the artist Alfred Hugh Fisher in 1907 to create a photographic record of the people and lands of the British Empire. The committee also commissioned other artists, such as E.J. Stephenson, who was married to a patent agent in Harare called Gilbert Stephenson, and produced a series of watercolours of places and scenes in Southern Africa. Published outputs from the committee included H. Mackinder's Eight Lectures on India and four volumes by Arthur John Sargent (1871-1947), including Seven Lectures on South Africa.

COVIC was discontinued after World War I, though COVIC photographs continued to circulate in school classrooms until 1945.

Papers relating to COVIC are held at Cambridge University Library.
