= Our Lady of Lourdes Church, Tiruchirappalli =

Our Lady of Lourdes
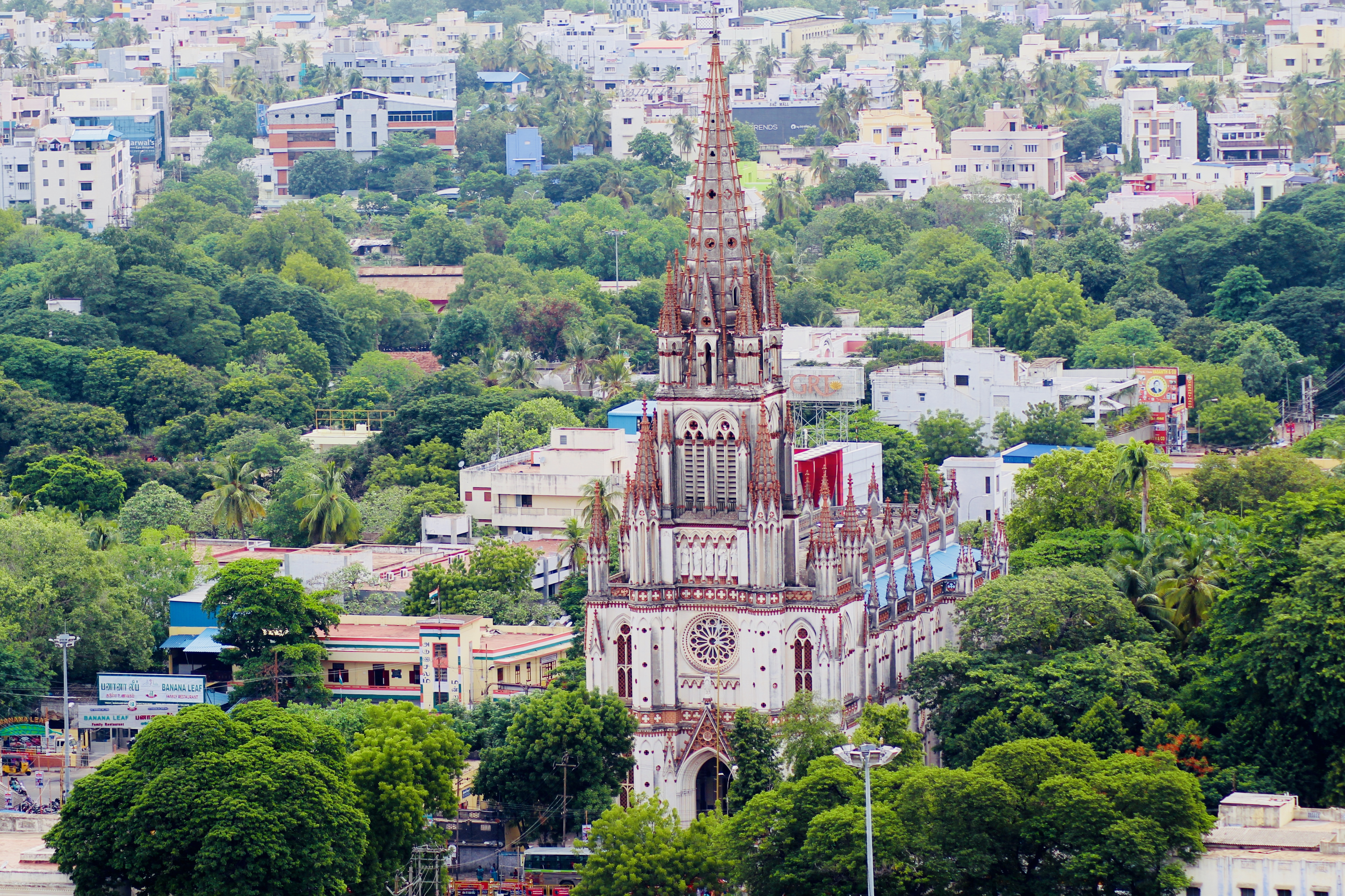
- Aerial view of the church
- Our Lady of Lourdes
- 10°49′37″N 78°41′33″E
- Location: Tiruchirapalli, Tamil Nadu
- Country: India
- Denomination: Roman Catholic

History
- Dedication: Our Lady of Lourdes
- Consecrated: c. AD 1840; 186 years ago

Architecture
- Functional status: Active
- Style: Gothic

The Our Lady of Lourdes Church is located in the city of Tiruchirapalli in the state of Tamil Nadu, India. Built in the Gallo-Catholic design, the Church is devoted to Our Lady of Lourdes. The church is considered one of oldest of the 22 churches in the city which are older than 100 years. The church is located in the premises of St. Joseph's College Higher Secondary School, Trichy.

The foundation was laid during 1895 and the construction completed by 1903 when it was thrown open to public. The images of St. Ignatius, St. Francis Xavier, Sacred Heart of Jesus, St. Peter, and St. John de Britto on the middle of the spire is the most notable feature of the church. The renovated church was dedicated on 10 February 1998 and the Way of cross was blessed and erected during 1999. The church presents a case study of a Gothic style church built fully with indigenous material and craftsmen. The church is associated with the Roman Catholic Diocese of Tiruchirapalli, while it is maintained and administered by the Fathers of Society of Jesus (The Jesuits).

== Architecture ==
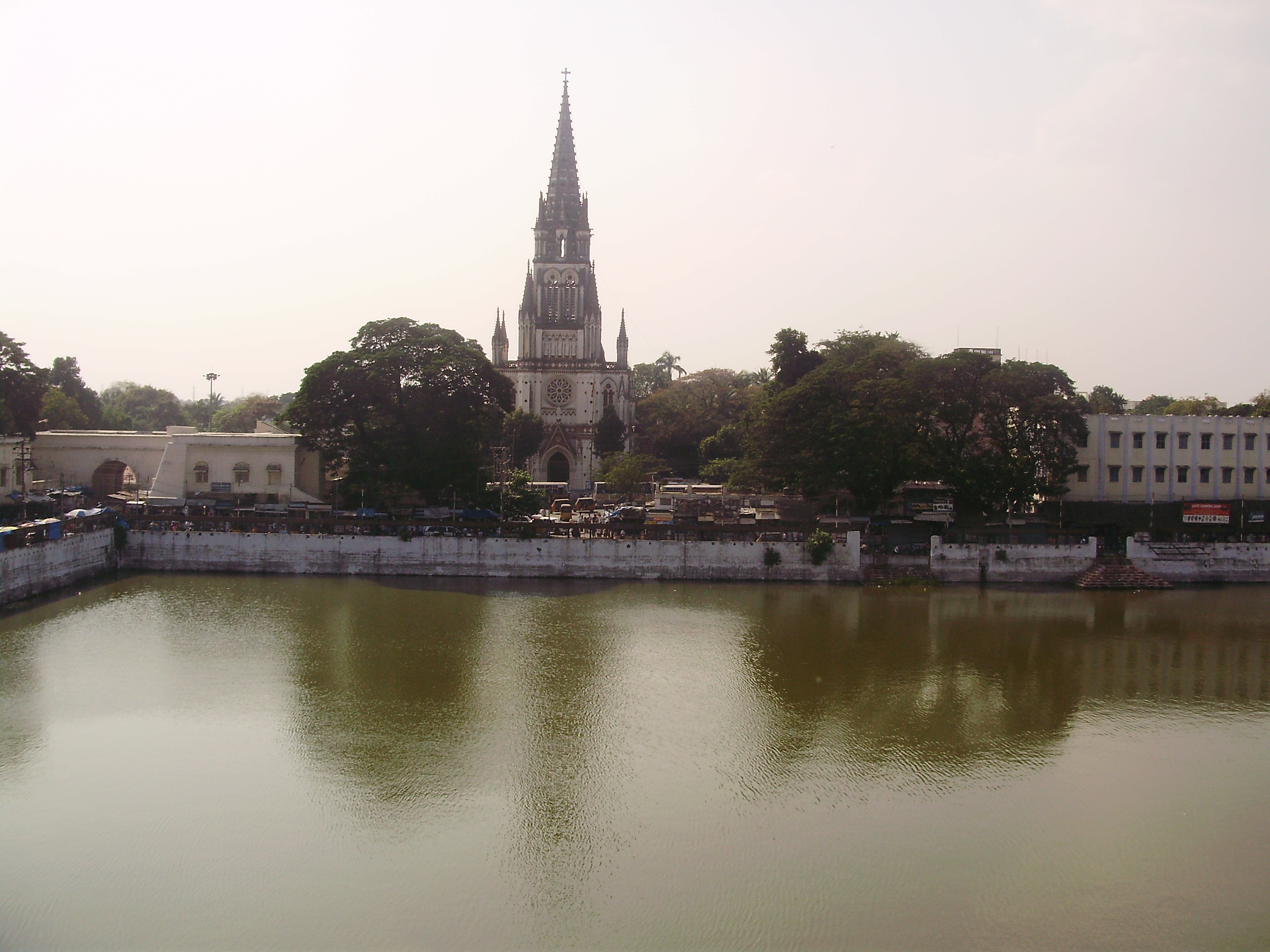
A view of the church with Teppakulam and Mainguard gate in the foreground

Our Lady of Lourdes Church is located opposite to Main Guard gate in Trichy, a major City in the South Indian state of Tamil Nadu. The church is located in the premises of St. Joseph's College Higher Secondary School, Trichy. The church is decked out in Gallo-Catholic design, from neo-Gothic spires to anguished scenes of crucifixion and martyrdom painted inside. In a note of cross-religious pollination, icons of Virgin Mary are garlanded in flower necklaces. Constructed in the year 1881 AD, the church is situated near the Rock Fort. The main tower is 220 ft (67 m) in height, and the small towers at 120 ft (37 m) feet in height. There are around 120 turrets in the building. The statues of the Sacred Heart of Jesus, St. Ignatius of Loyola, St. Francis Xavier and St. John de Britto are placed at the center of the tower. The church is painted in white and maroon. The glass windows are painted with different chapters in the life of Jesus. The church bell is set at a height of 90 ft (27 m). The altar of the church is made of sandalwood. As per the research paper of the National Institute of Technology Tiruchirapalli (NITT), the church presents a case study of a Gothic style church built fully with indigenous material and craftsmen. The place where it is located was part of the moat surrounding the Fort of Tiruchirappalli. Concrete was laid in the foundation filling the granite holes to a depth of nearly 20 ft (6.1 m). The cross on the top of the building is 8 ft (2.4 m) long and acts as the lightning conductor.
