= Tiruchirappalli Fort =

Tiruchirappalli Fort (Trichinopoly Fort)
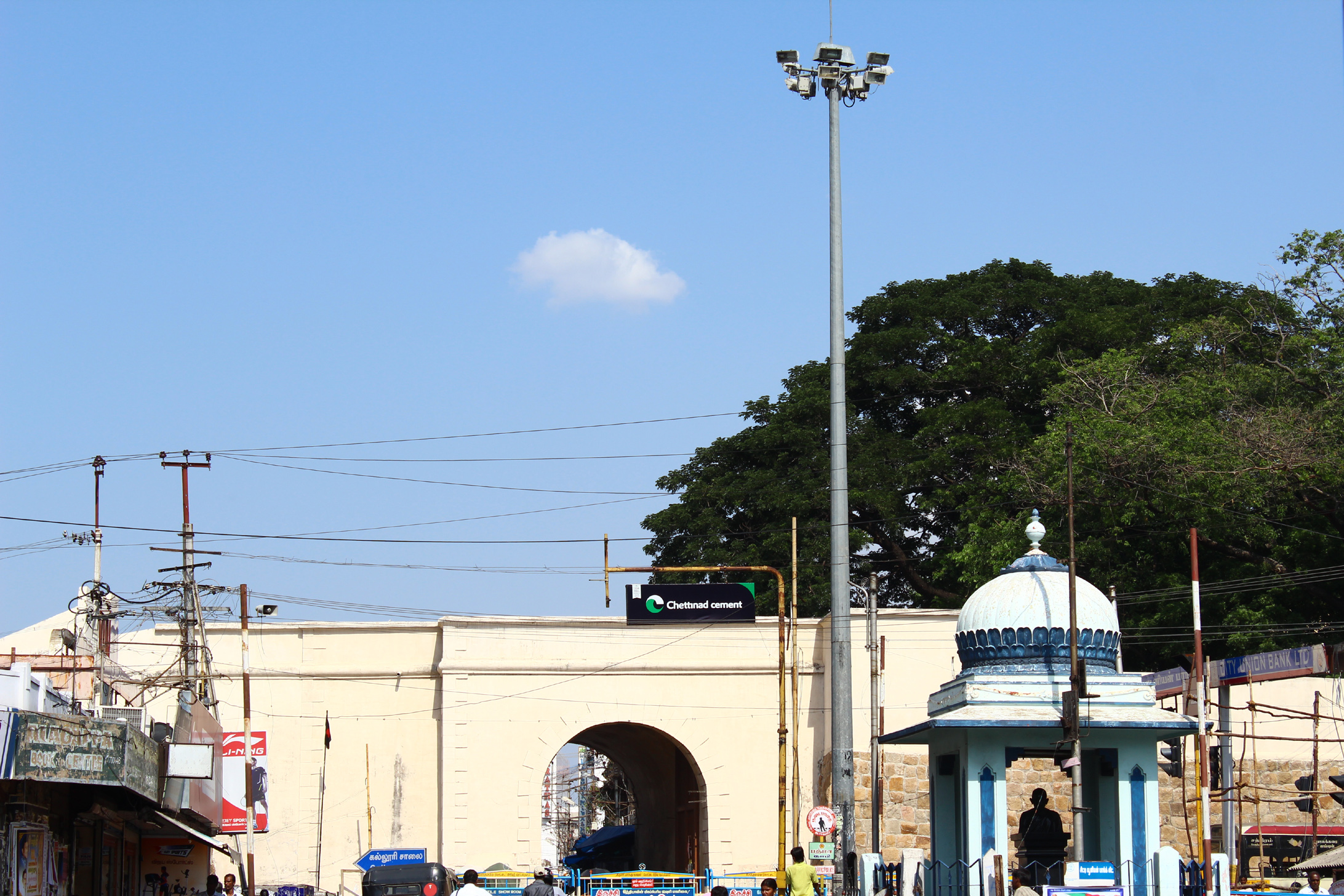
- Broken Ramparts of Tiruchirapalli Fort

- Location in Tamil Nadu, India
- 10.805°N 78.685°E
- Location: Trichirapalli, India

Site notes
- Elevation: 88 m (289 ft)
- Architectural style: Dravidian architecture (Nayakkar of Madurai)
- Current use: Ruins

Tiruchirappalli Fort is a dilapidated fort in India which once protected the Old City of Trichy encompassing Big Bazaar Street, Singarathope, Bishop Heber School, Teppakulam and Tiruchirapalli Rock Fort. All that remains now is a railway station with that name and Main Guard Gate along West Boulevard Road in the city of Tiruchirappalli in Tamil Nadu. The fort can be traced along West Boulevard Road in West, East Boulevard Road in East, Butter-worth Road in North and Gandhi Market to the South.

Tiruchirapalli Fort Railway Station lies opposite the Main Guard Gate and Tiruchirapalli Town Station lies towards its Eastern Entrance.

Strategically sited on the bank of the River Cauvery (Kaveri) in Southern India, about 56 miles (90 km) from the sea, Trichinopoly was the third most important fortified post in the Madras Presidency (after Fort St. George and Fort St. David). The rectangular fort was built to enclose the Rock, one of several natural outcrops of volcanic gneiss which rise abruptly from the plain.

== Origin of the Tiruchirappalli Fort ==
The greater part of the fort of Tiruchirappalli and most of the city was built in the reign of Viswanatha Nayaker, King of Madurai, from 1559. His grandson, Chokkanatha Nayaker, was responsible for making it the kingdom's capital. In the mid-eighteenth century the city was a frequent centre of conflict between French and British forces in the struggle to control Southern India. The city also suffered attacks during the Mysore Wars of the second half of the century, when it was devastated more than once.

== Structures inside the fort complex ==
=== Origin of Rock Fort ===
The Rock is said to be one of the oldest formations in the world. It is 3.8 billion years old, making it as old as the rocks in Greenland and older than the Himalayas. Quartz, used in glass making, and feldspar, used in ceramics, are found in this rock formation. It is also the highest and the largest single rock on Earth that is a tourist attraction.

=== Constructions ===
As the name suggests, the Rock Fort Temple is situated on 83 metre-high outcrops. The Pallavas initially built this temple, but the Nayaks made use of its naturally fortified position and designed it again. It is a long climb up the 437 steps cut into the stone to the top.

=== Temple Complex ===
The temple complex in the fort complex is a collection of three temples:

- the Manikka Vinayakar temple at the foot of the hill, dedicated to Lord Ganesha
- the Ucchi Pillayar Temple at the top of the hill, dedicated to Lord Ganesha
- the Taayumaanavar Koyil Shivastalam, a rock cut temple dedicated to a Nayaka era saint, Taayumaanavar

Mathrubutheswarar, dedicated to Lord Shiva, has a lingam which is a projection of the rock itself. It is reached by a flight of steps on the way to Ucchi Pillayar Temple.

=== Rock-Cut Temple ===
The rock-cut temple in the hill temple complex was built during the Pallava era and is named Lalitankura Pallaveswaram, with several inscriptions attributed to Mahendravarman I. The Cholas, the Vijayanagar rulers and the Nayaks of Madurai have made extensive contributions here. The two-storey-tall Taayumaanava temples are considered to be a masterpiece of construction.

=== Tank ===
At the foot of the rock fort stands a tank and a pavilion which are used during the float festival of the temples. These were by Viswanatha Naicker of Madurai to hold major religious festivals.

Near the tank is the house and 18th-century Church of Our Lady of Lourdes built by Reverend Schwartz of Denmark.

=== Mosque ===
Mosque built by Nawab of Arcot lays perpendicular to Clives Hostel facing the Tank.

=== English Quarters ===
Presently called Clives Hostel was once quarters which housed the English Soldiers and their Commander Robert Clive

=== Palace ===
The mid-17th-century palace at the base of the rock was built by Chokkanatha Naicker, now known as Rani Mangammal Mahal or Town Hall, and features a Durbar hall. Historians thought the palace was built by Chokkanatha Naicker after he demolished three-fourths of the Thirumalai Naicker palace. This palace was supposedly used as a Warehouse in this palace. This palace was also the Durbar hall of Madurai Naickers when Tiruchapalli was the capital during the years 1616 to 1634 and 1665 to 1736. Today, it houses a museum, Fort Police Station and state government offices like Taluka Office.

=== Main Guard Gate ===
The main guard gate was one of the main entrances for the fort complex. It is located on the major fort wall enclosing the periphery of the rock fort with its temples, lake, the palace and bazaars. The main entrance faces the north.

== Major battles ==
=== Nayak era ===
As the Fort was the capital of the Madurai Nayak Dynasty, the fort has witnessed fierce battles. One of the largest was the Battle of Toppur for supremacy between the Aravidu Dynasty of Vijayanagara Emperor and the Madurai Nayaks. The former won, with support from the Mysore and Tanjore rulers in the 16th century. Later, the Nayaks faced fierce attacks from Bijapur, Mysore and Marathas troops. The Fort complex formed the northwest territory to the Nayaks. During their two-century rule, they had occasional skirmishes with their neighbours, the Tanjore Nayaks, the Tanjore Marathas, and more often with the invading Bijapur, Mysore and Maratha armies.

=== Carnatic Nawab Era ===
During the mid century, Chanda Sahib, aided by the French, made this fort his home base. He battled with the combined forces of the Carnatic Nawab and British. He was defeated in the Carnatic wars and was forced to cede his lands to the British.

=== British Era ===
In the late 18th century, Hyder Ali and Tipu Sultan were a major threat to the British, as were the French who were still fighting for their colonial supremacy in this region. By now, the town was firmly established as a Cantonment town and the fort's gate was known as Main Guard Gate.Robert Clive lived near the tank when he was in Tiruchirappalli at the Clives Lodge facing Temple Tank . Today Clives Lodge houses many Book Depots and Hotel Vasantha Bhavan.

== See also ==
- Fort St George
- Fort St David
- Siege of Trichinopoly (1751–1752)
