= Ucchi Pillayar Temple, Rockfort =

Temple in Tamil Nadu, India

Ucchi Pillayar Temple
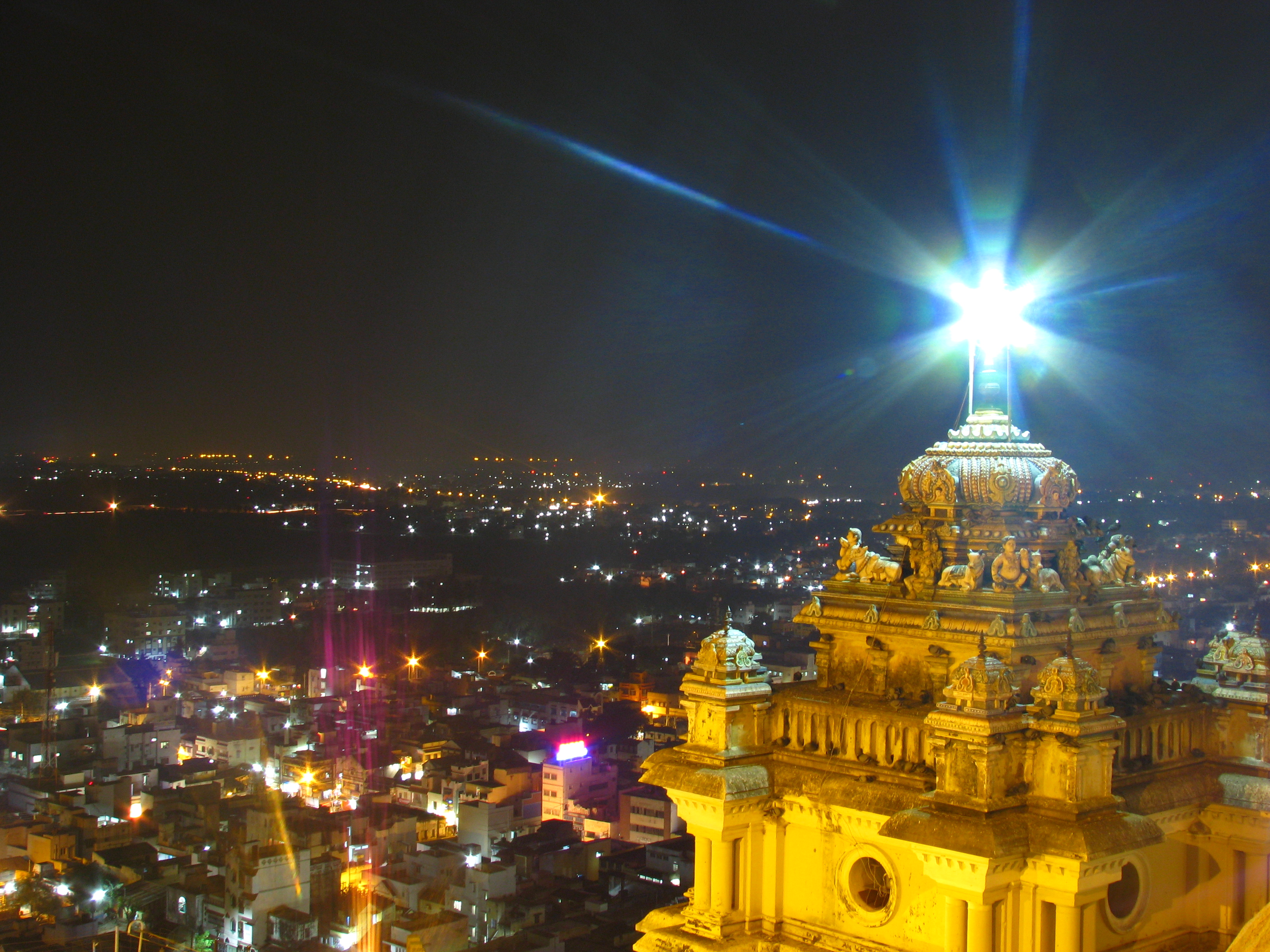

- Ucchi Pillayar Temple, Rockfort, Tiruchirapalli, (Tamil Nadu) Ucchi Pillayar Temple, Rockfort (India)

Religion
- Affiliation: Hinduism
- Deity: Thayumanavar (Shiva); Manikka Vinayagar (Ganesha); Ucchi Pillaiyar (Ganesha); Mattuvar Kuyalammai (Parvati)

Location
- Location: Tiruchirappalli
- State: Tamil Nadu
- Country: India
- Coordinates: 10°49′42.7″N 78°41′49.4″E

Architecture
- Type: Dravidian architecture
- Completed: 20th century
- Elevation: 126.17 m (414 ft)

Website
- trichyrockfort.tnhrce.in

The Ucchi Pillayar Temple is a 7th-century-CE Hindu temple, one dedicated to Ganesha located a top of Rock Fort, Trichy, Tamil Nadu, India. According to legend, this rock is the place where Ganesha ran from King Vibishana, after establishing the Ranganathaswamy deity in Srirangam.

== Architecture ==
The Rock Fort temple stands 83 metres (272 ft) tall perched atop a rock. The smooth rock was first cut by the Pallavas but it was the Nayaks of Madurai who completed both the temples under the Vijayanagara Empire.

The Ganesha temple is much smaller with an access through steep steps carved on the rock and provides views of Trichy, Srirangam and the rivers Kaveri and Kollidam. Due to its ancient architecture, created by the Pallavas, the temple is maintained by the Archaeological department of India.

== Legend ==
According to the Sri Ranga Mahatmya, after the war in the Ramayana, Rama blessed Vibhishana with a vigraham (idol for worship) of Ranganatha, a form of Vishnu. He was informed that once he set the idol on the ground, he would be unable to move it again.

The devas did not wish the idol to taken away to Lanka, so they devised a plan. During his journey, Vibhishana stopped by the Kaveri river to bathe and perform worship. Spotting a young Brahmana boy on the riverbank, he entrusted the idol to him, instructing him not to set it on the ground. But as Vibhishana bathed, the boy set the idol down and ran towards a nearby hill.

Angered, Vibhishana chased after the boy and upon catching him, struck him on the forehead. To his astonishment, the boy revealed himself to be Ganesha. As Vibhishana apologised, Ganesha blessed him and explained that the idol was destined to remain in Srirangam. He instructed Vibhishana to return to Lanka, leaving the idol behind.

The place in which the Ranganatha idol was kept was later covered in deep fores. It was eventually discovered when a Chola king chasing a parrot came upon it. He consecrated the idol and built the Ranganathaswamy Temple, Srirangam. Meanwhile, the Pallavas built the Ucchi Pillaiyar temple and the Thayumanaswamy temple, upon the hill that Ganesha used to escape Vibishana.

Ucchi Pillayar is associated with Manicka Vinayagar at the foothills. It is a general worship practise to pray obeisance to Manicaka Vinayagar before visiting Ucchi Pillayar.

The temple is maintained and administered by the Hindu Religious and Charitable Endowments Department of the Government of Tamil Nadu.

== Gallery ==
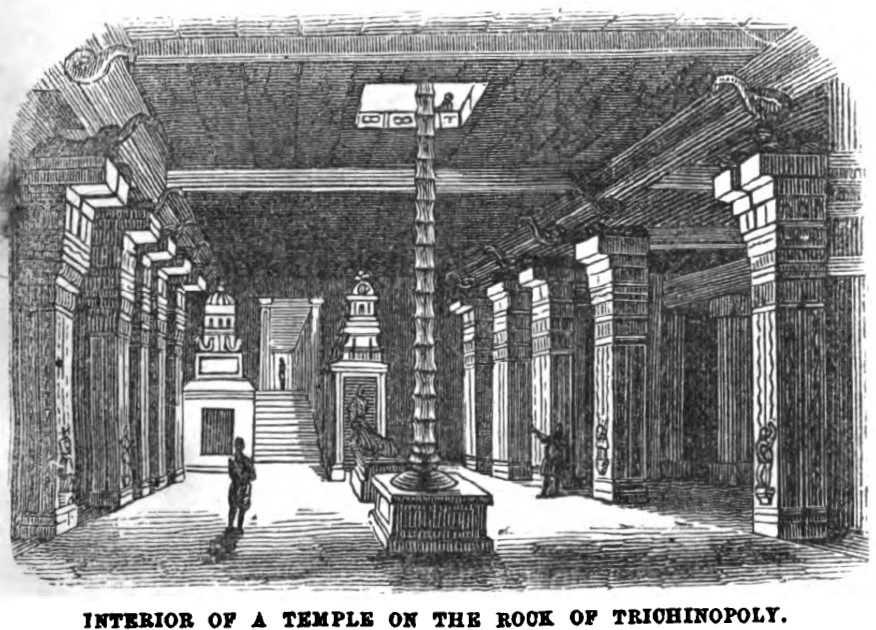
Interior of a Temple on the Rock of Trichinopoly (1847)

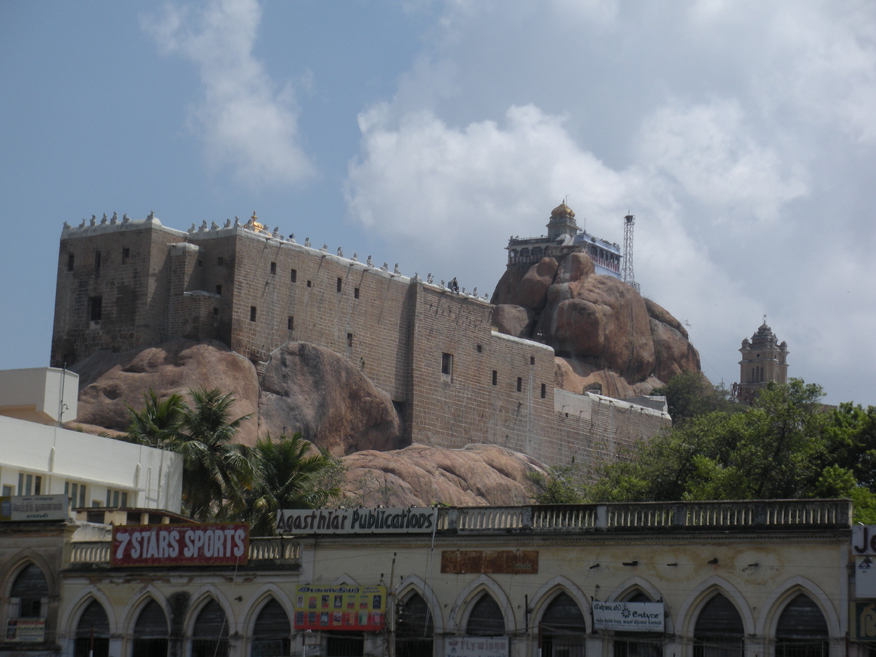
Rockfort as viewed from Lourdes Church

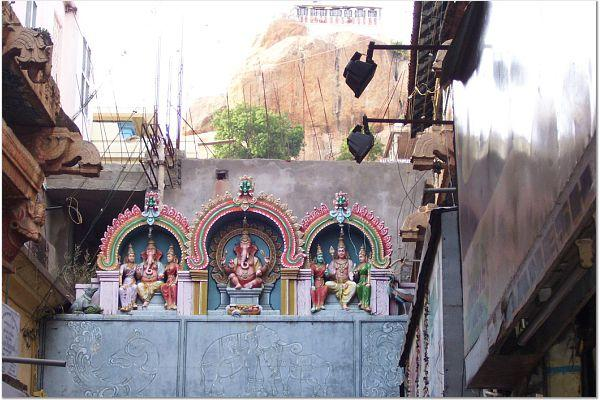
Main entrance to the temple

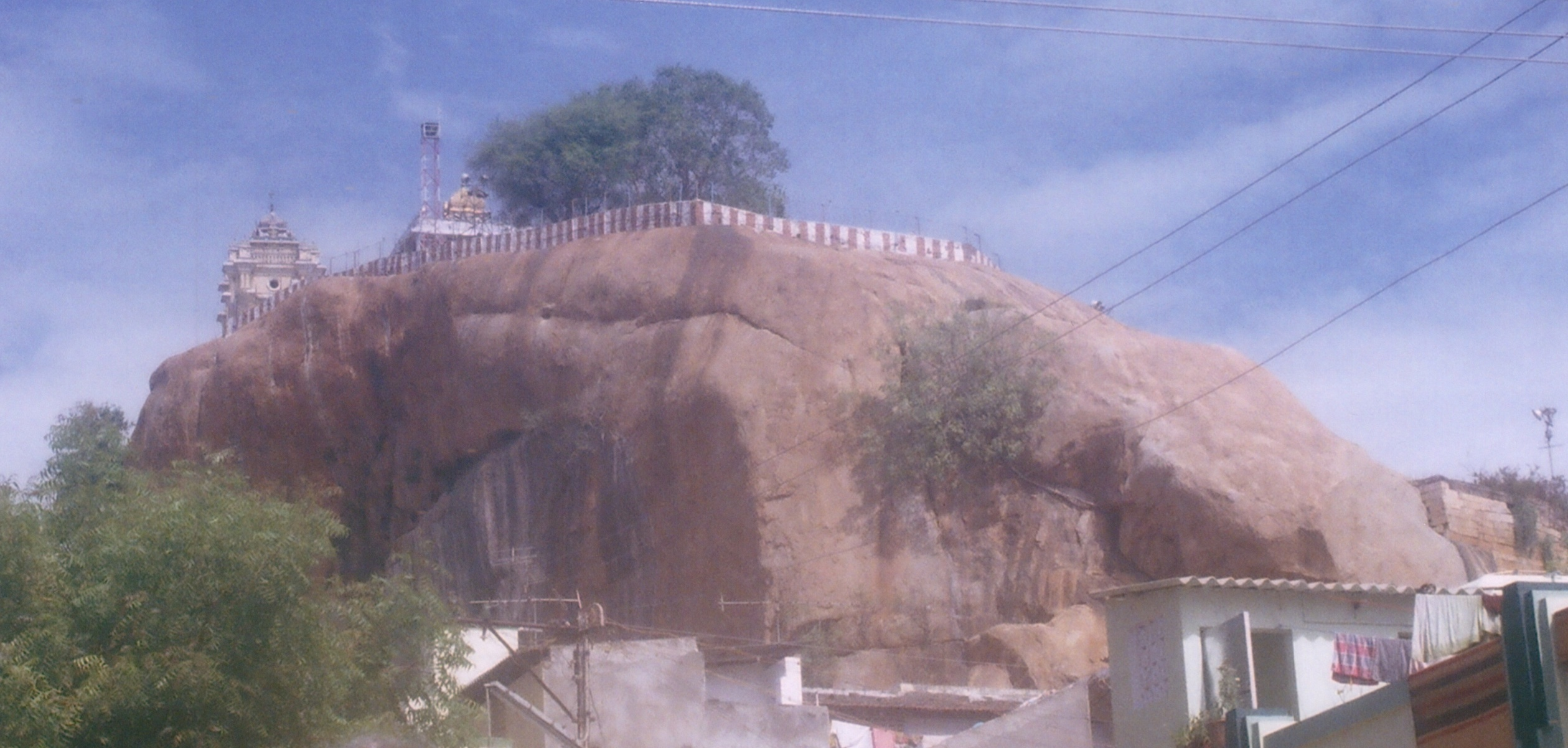
View from the east side of the temple

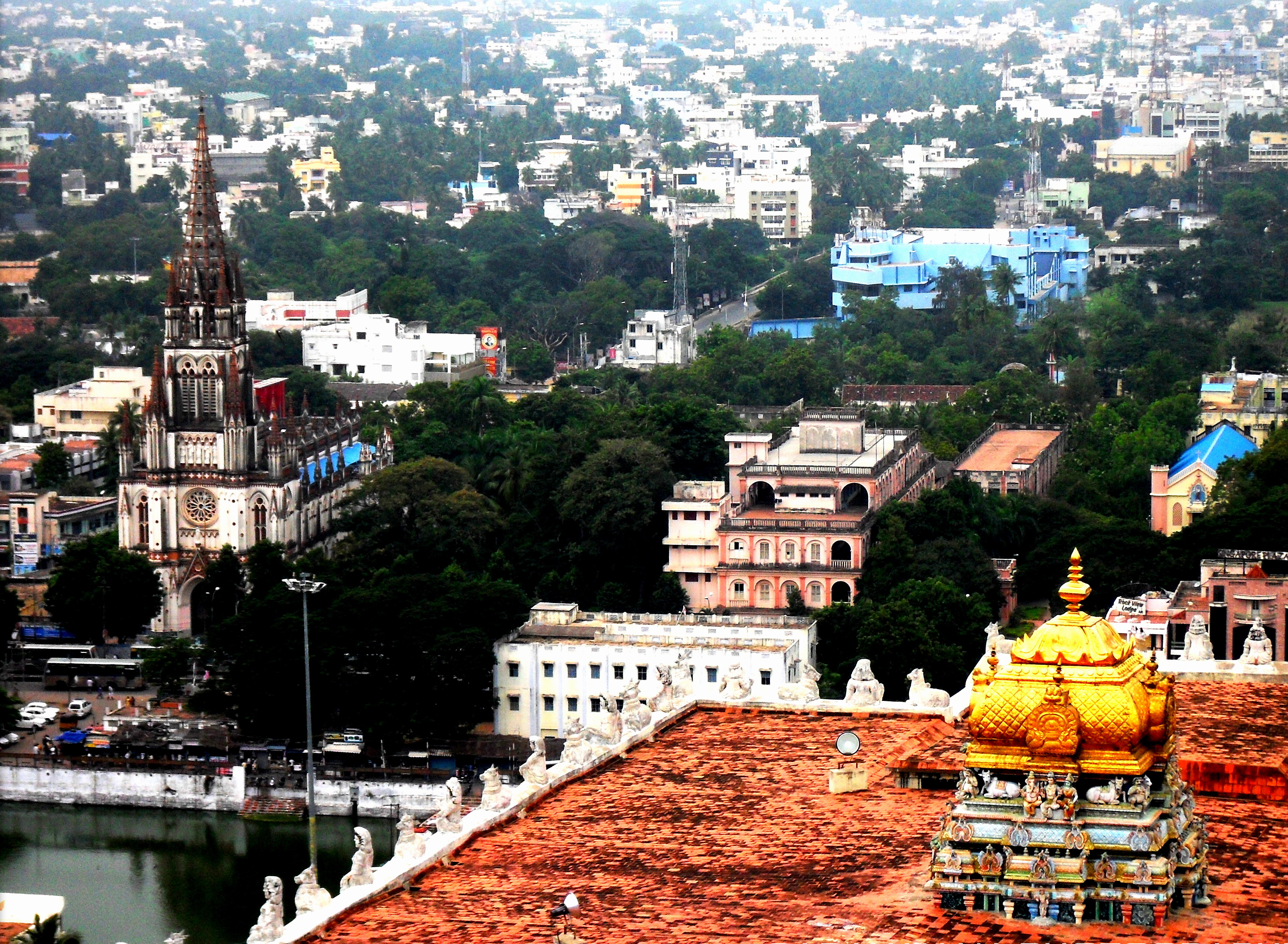
View from atop the temple

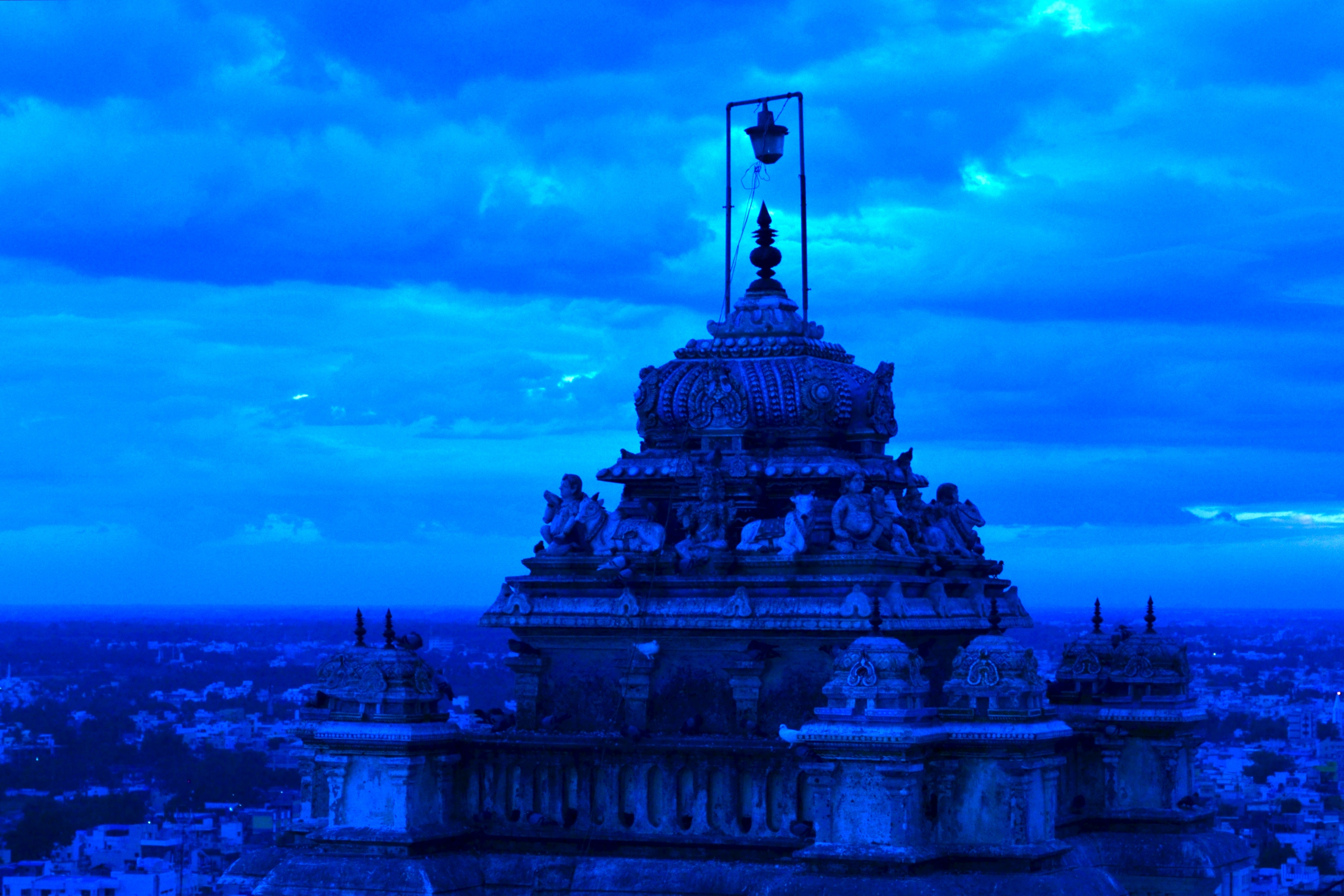
Gopuram of the Temple

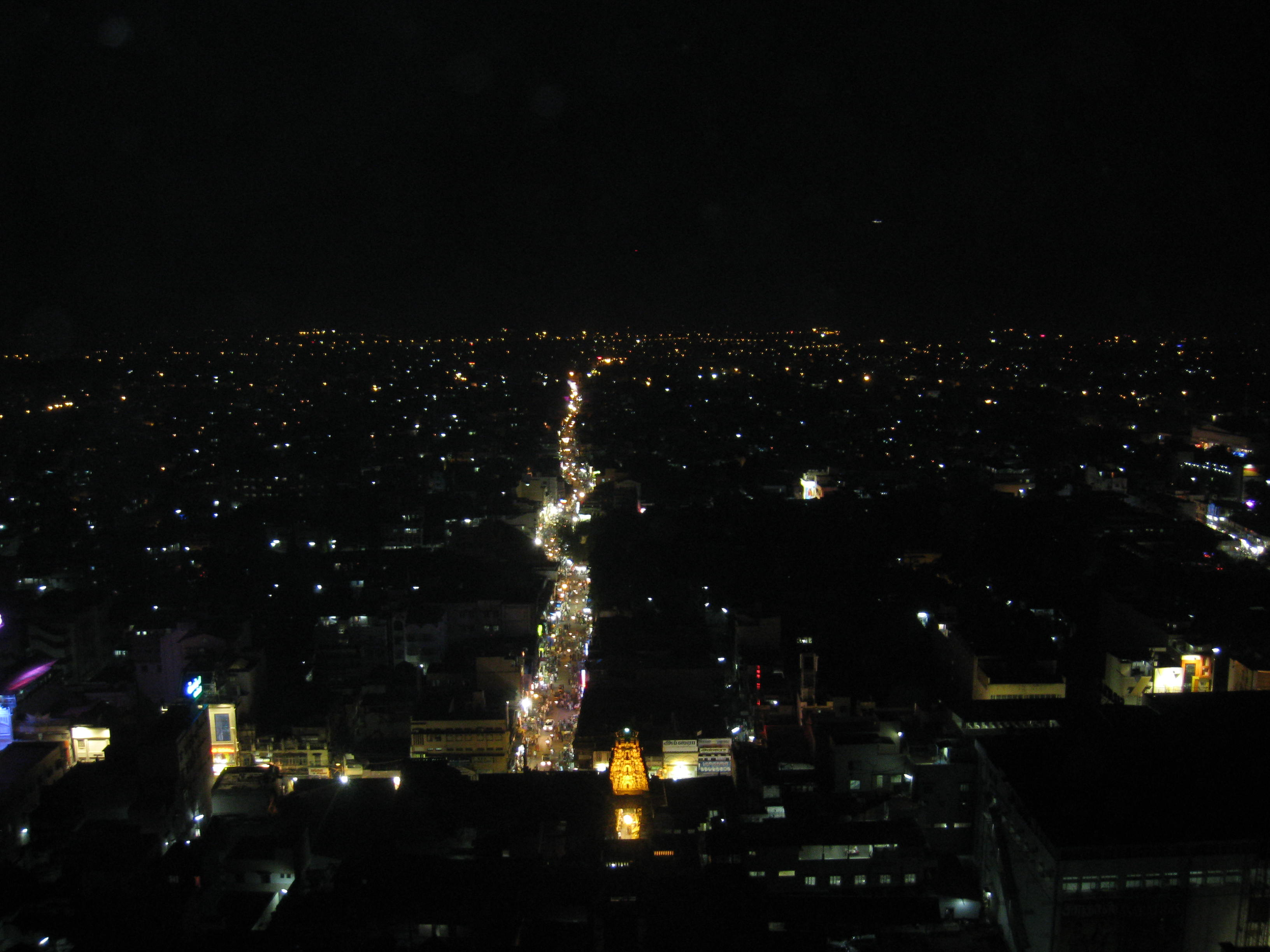
Trichy at night, as viewed from the Uchchi Pillayar Temple, Rockfort

== See also ==
- Tiruchirapalli
- Srirangam
- Ranganathaswamy temple at Srirangam
- Thiruvanaikaval
