= Thayumanavar =

Indian religious leader

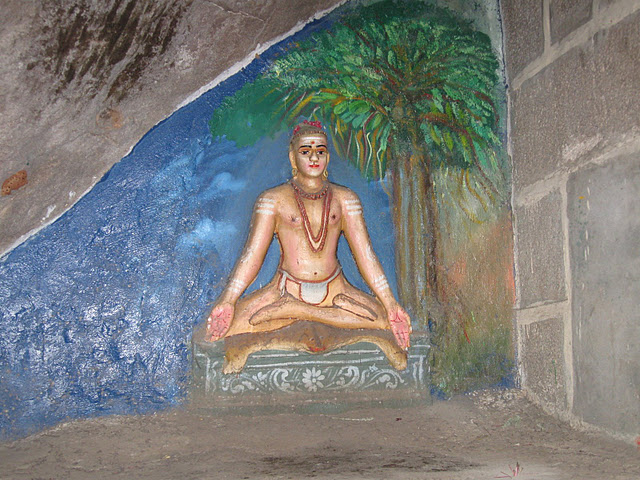
- Thayumanavar

Personal life
- Born: 1705 Tamil Nadu; India
- Died: 1744 (aged 38–39)

Religious life
- Religion: Hinduism
- Philosophy: Saiva Siddhanta

Thayumanavar or Tayumanavar (Tamil: தாயுமானவர் Tāyumānavar) (1705–1744) was a Tamil spiritual philosopher from Tamil Nadu, India. Thayumanavar articulated the Saiva Siddhanta philosophy. He wrote several Tamil hymns of which 1454 are available. His first four songs were sung 250 years ago at the Congress of Religions in Tiruchirappalli. His poems follow his own mystical experience, but they also outline the philosophy of Hinduism, and the Tirumandiram by Saint Tirumular in its highest form, one that is at once devotional and nondual, one that sees God as both immanent and transcendent.

Thayumanavar's key teaching is to discipline the mind, control desires and meditate peacefully. He went on to say that "it is easy to control an elephant, catch hold of the tiger's tail, grab the snake and dance, dictate the angels, transmigrate into another body, walk on water or sit on the sea; but it is more difficult to control the mind and remain quiet".

== Spiritually Elevating songs ==
Thayumanavar was a respected scholar in Tamil. He was also a scholar in Sanskrit and was a minister to the King in Tiruchirapalli in South India. His name hails from the name of the deity of the Thayumanaswami Temple in Rockfort in Tiruchirapalli. When he became god-minded he quit his job and began roaming, preaching Saiva Siddhanta philosophy and Shiva worship. His songs are full of the divine bliss which he enjoyed and transmitted in abundance. The songs on the theme of the Atman craving for the union with the Supreme, are famous for their authenticity, simplicity and easily remembered language. He is also known for his unceasing emphasis on the unity of all paths to God and of all religions, and, in particular, on the unity of the Shaiva Siddhanta and Vedanta.

== See everything through Love ==
Here is one example of Thayumanavar's presentation of the highest thoughts of philosophy in simple Tamil:

aRuLāl evaiyum pār enRēn—attai aRiyāde chuTTi en aRivāle pārthēn; iRuLāna poruL kaNDadallāl ennaiyum kaNDilan ennaDi tozhi.

meaning, See everything through Love, says my teacher. But in my ignorance, I probed through my intelligence. What I saw was only darkness and in that darkness, I did not see even myself!

== Infinite Bliss, for meditation ==
Ever-permanent, without any blemish, without any ignorance, without support, ever-full, undecayingly pure, far as well as near, like the Light beyond the three luminaries (Sun, Moon and Fire), the One Charm that includes all, overflowing with Bliss, undiscernible to mind or speech, standing as the Colossus of Consciousness—on that vastness of the beginning of Infinite Bliss, let us meditate.
