= Thayumanaswami Temple, Rockfort =

Thayumanaswami Temple
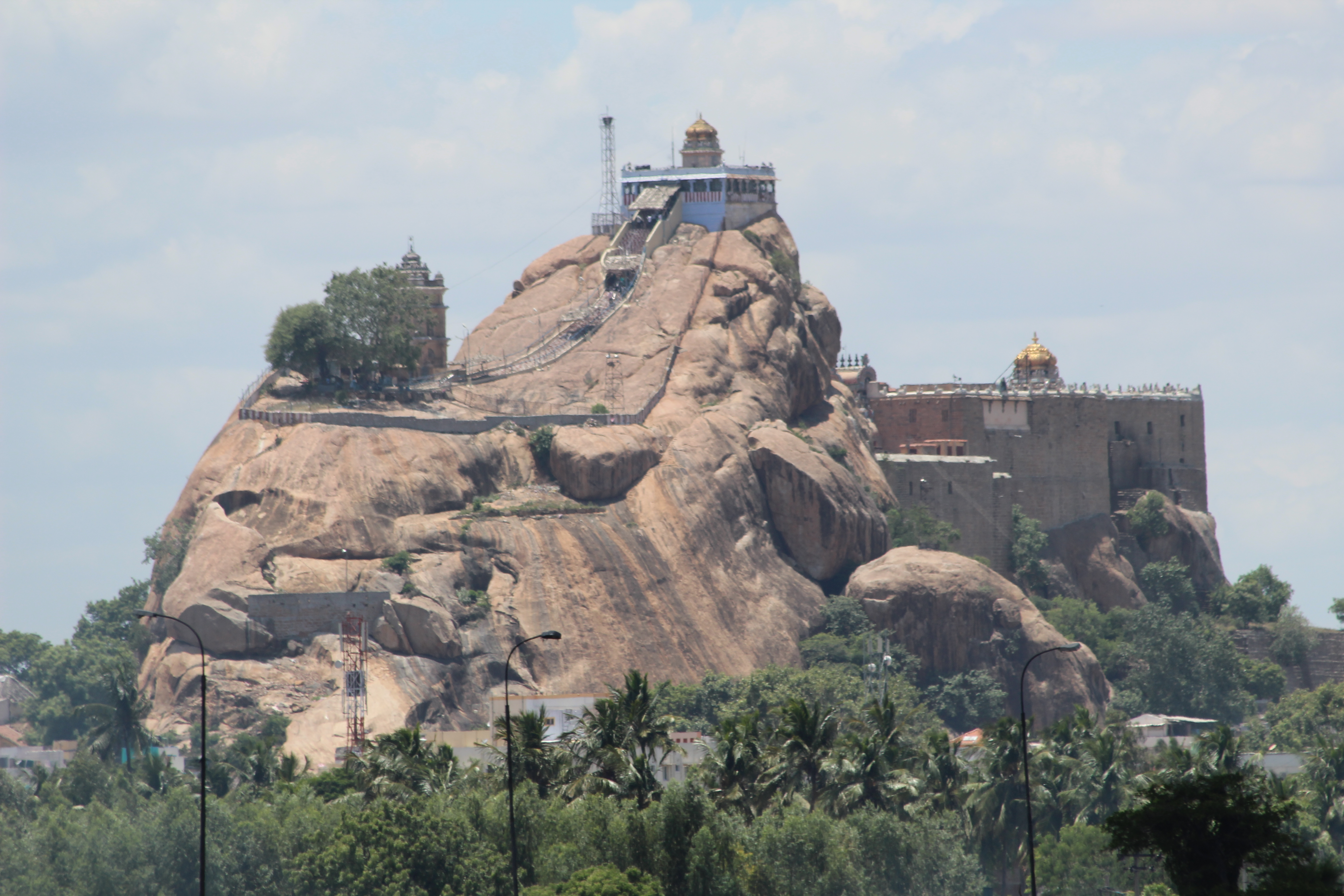

- Location in Tamil Nadu

Religion
- Affiliation: Hinduism
- Deity: Thayumanavar Mattuvar Kuzhalammai

Location
- Location: Trichi
- State: Tamil Nadu
- Country: India
- Coordinates: 10°49′43″N 78°41′49″E

Architecture
- Type: Dravidian architecture

The Thayumanavar Temple is a temple situated in the Rockfort complex (Malaikottai மலைக்கோட்டை) in the city of Tiruchirappalli, India. Shiva is worshipped as Thayumanavar, and is represented by the lingam and his consort Parvati is depicted as Mattuvar Kuzhalammai. The presiding deity is revered in the 7th-century-CE Tamil Saiva canonical work, the Tevaram, written by Tamil saint poets known as the nayanars and classified as Paadal Petra Sthalam.

According to Hindu legend, a pregnant woman named Rathnavathi was an ardent devotee of Shiva and he arrived in the form of her mother to attend to her delivery. The presiding deity is thus named Thayumanaswamy, the one who acted as mother. The Rockfort is a fortress which stands atop a 273-foot-high rock, consisting of a set of monolithic rocks accommodating many rock-cut cave temples. Originally built by the Pallavas, it was later reconstructed by the Madurai Nayaks and Vijayanagara rulers. The major complex in the temple is believed to be built during the 8th century by the Pandyan Empire.

The temple has six daily rituals at various times from 5:30 a.m. to 10 p.m., and twelve yearly festivals on its calendar. The Chittirai festival during the Tamil month of Chittirai (April - May) is celebrated for fifteen days, portraying the various incidents associated with the temple legend. The temple is maintained and administered by the Hindu Religious and Charitable Endowments Department of the Government of Tamil Nadu.

== Legend ==
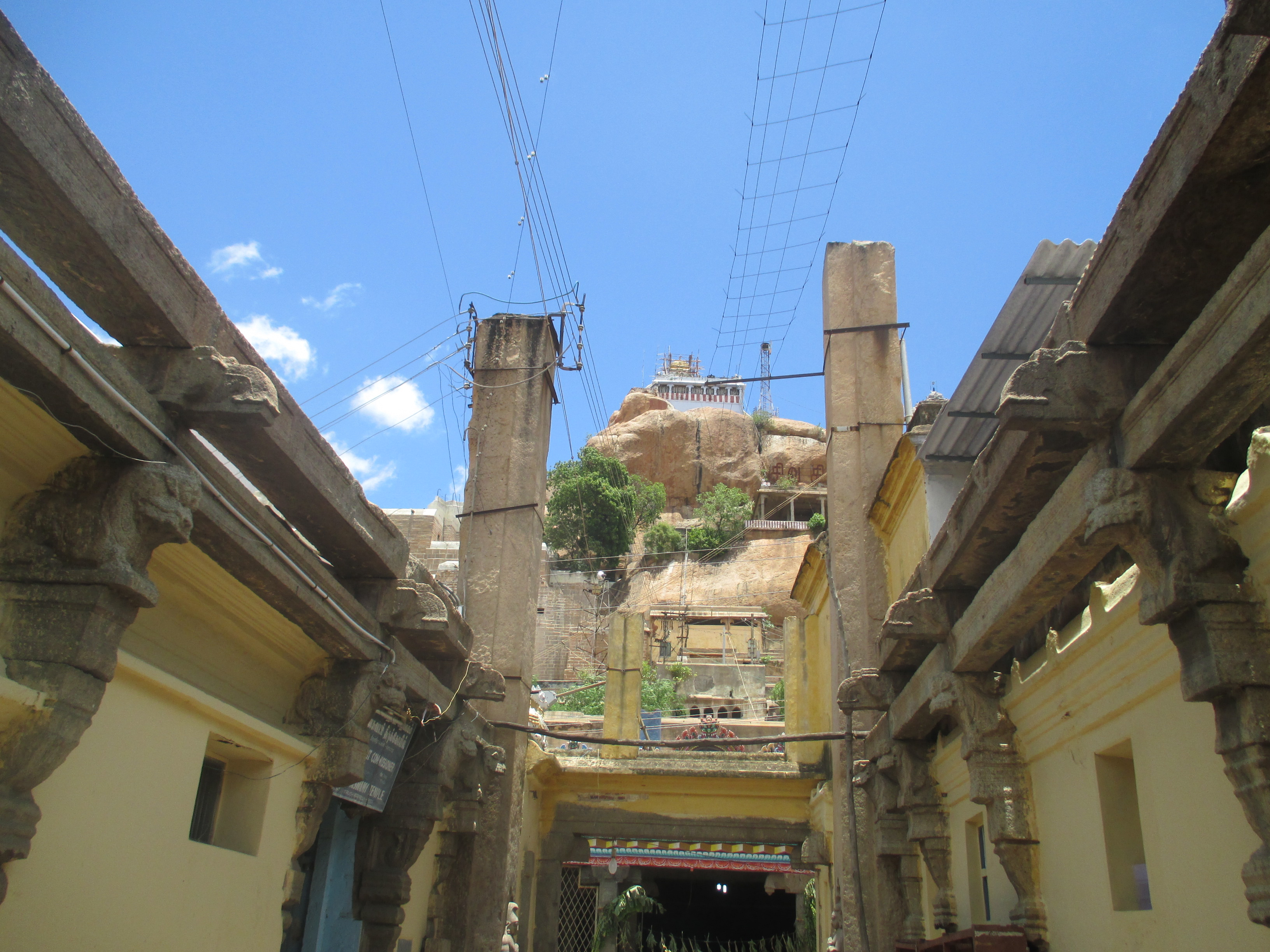
Thayumanaswamy Temple at Trichy

According to Hindu legend, a pregnant woman named Rathnavathi was an ardent devotee of Shiva. While nearing labour, she requested her mother to come over. Her mom could not reach on account of heavy floods in river Cauvery. As the delivery time came closer, Rathnavathi prayed to Shiva. Shiva, moved by the devotion of Rathnavathi, took the form of Rathnavathi's mother and helped with her smooth delivery. After the delivery, Shiva vanished and Rathnavathi's mother arrived later. The family learned that it was Shiva who attended to the delivery. Shiva disguised himself as a mother for a pregnant lady, leading to the name Thayumanavar, meaning the one who became a mother.

According to Hindu mythology, the city Tiruchirappalli derives its name from a legend associated with the Thayumanaswamy temple. The three-headed demon Trishira, who meditated on Thayumanavar near the present-day city to obtain favours from the god. An alternative derivation, not universally accepted, is that the source of the city's name is the Sanskrit word "Trishirapuram"—Trishira, meaning "three-headed", and palli or puram meaning "city".

As per another legend, due to a fight between Adisesha (serpent god) and Vayu (Wind god) to seek ownership of Himalayas, the eight pieces of the mountain fell to eight different places. One of them was Trincomalee in Sri Lanka, Srikalahasti at Andhra Pradesh and Rockfort. The place became known as Trisikarapuram as there are three peaks in the temple, one each for Shiva, Parvathi and Ganesha.

== History ==
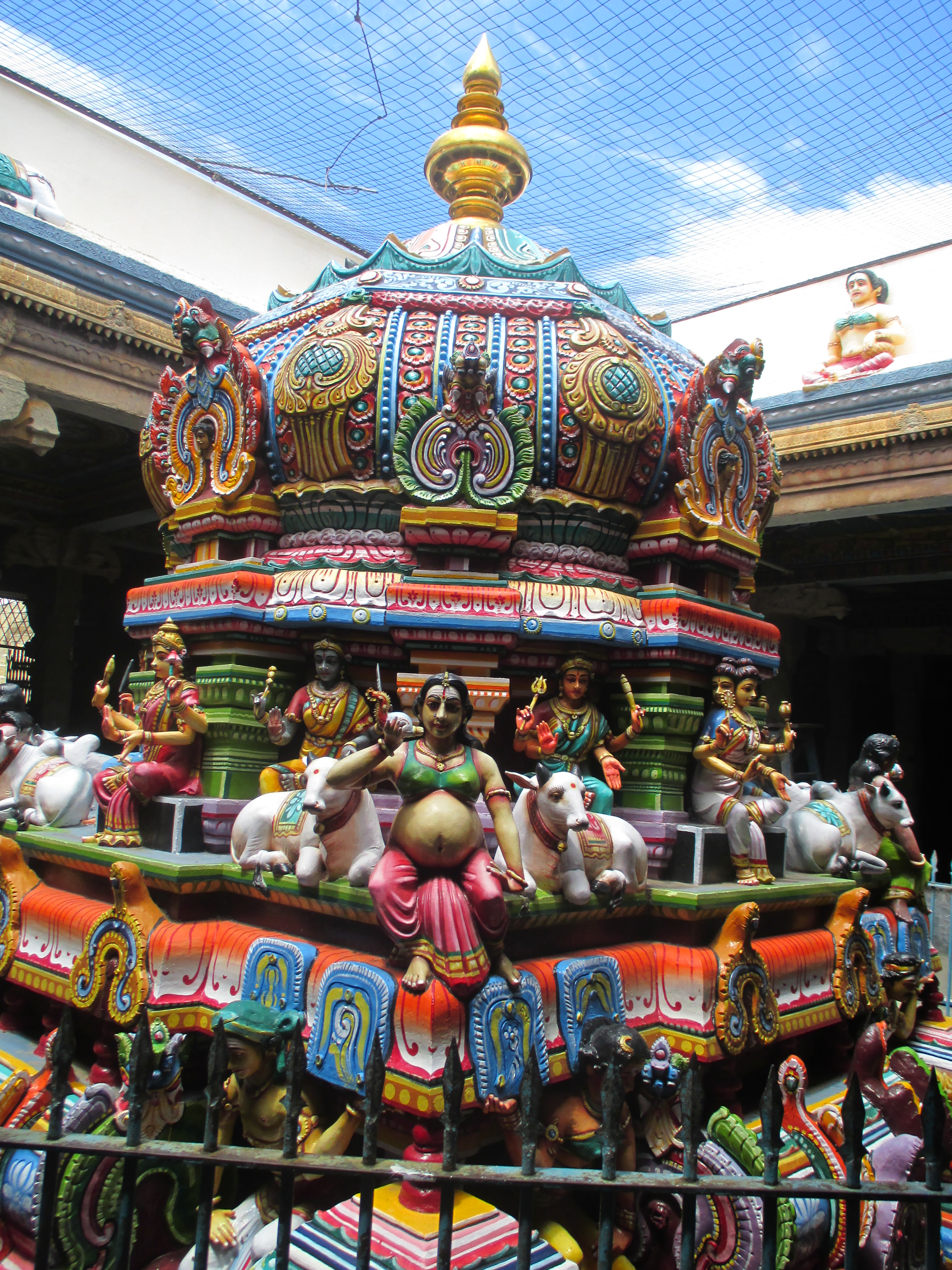
Shrine of Mattuvar Kuzhalammai

Tiruchirapalli was the capital of the Chola kingdom and it houses several exquisitely sculpted temples and fortresses, the centre of which is the Rockfort temple. The temple is built in the Dravidian style of architecture; The rock-cut cave temples of the Rockfort, along with the gateway and the Erumbeeswarar Temple, are listed as monuments of national importance by the Archaeological Survey of India.

The Rockfort is a fortress which stands atop a 273-foot-high rock. It consists of a set of monolithic rocks accommodating many rock-cut cave temples. Originally built by the Pallavas, it was later reconstructed by the Madurai Nayaks and Vijayanagara rulers. The major complex in the temple are believed to be built during the 8th century by the Pandyan Empire. The temple is maintained and administered by the Hindu Religious and Charitable Endowments Department of the Government of Tamil Nadu.

== Architecture ==
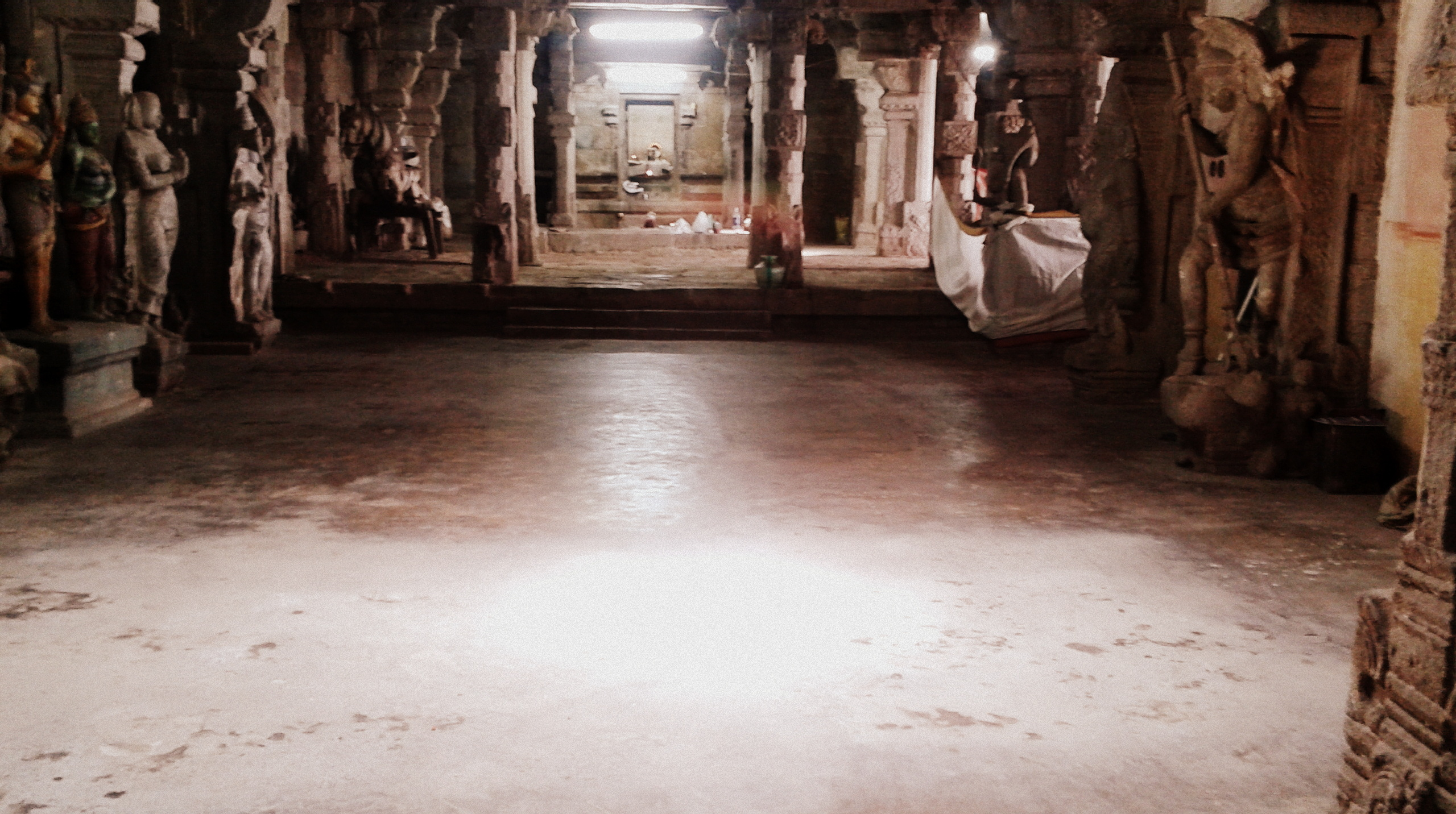
A view of pillared hall inside the temple

The temple complex has three shrines, two of which are dedicated to Lord Ganesha, one at the foot and the Ucchi Pillayar Temple at the top, and the Thayumanavar Temple between them. The Thayumanavar temple, the largest of the three, houses a shrine for Amman (the Goddess) as well as the main deity. The Rockfort is visible from almost every part of the city's north. The Teppakulam at the foot of the Rockfort is surrounded by bazaars. It has a mandapa at its centre and has facilities for boat riding. All the temple-related float festivals are held in the tank.

The temple is located halfway up the Rockfort. The temple has a columned structure. The central shrine of Thayumanaswamy is located a level up to the lower half that houses the shrine of Mattuvar Kuzhalammai. The lower level also houses the niches of Vinayagar, Arumugar, Navagrahas and Veerabadraswami. The walls around the central shrine house the image of Dakshinamurthy, Somaskandar, Natarajar, Surya, Brahma, and Durga. There were details that the temple layout was found in the Shanmata form. It had two principal shrines, Shiva in the east and Vishnu in the west and central bay. The reliefs of Skanda, Surya, Ganesha, and Durga were found on the central bay.

== Worship and festivals ==
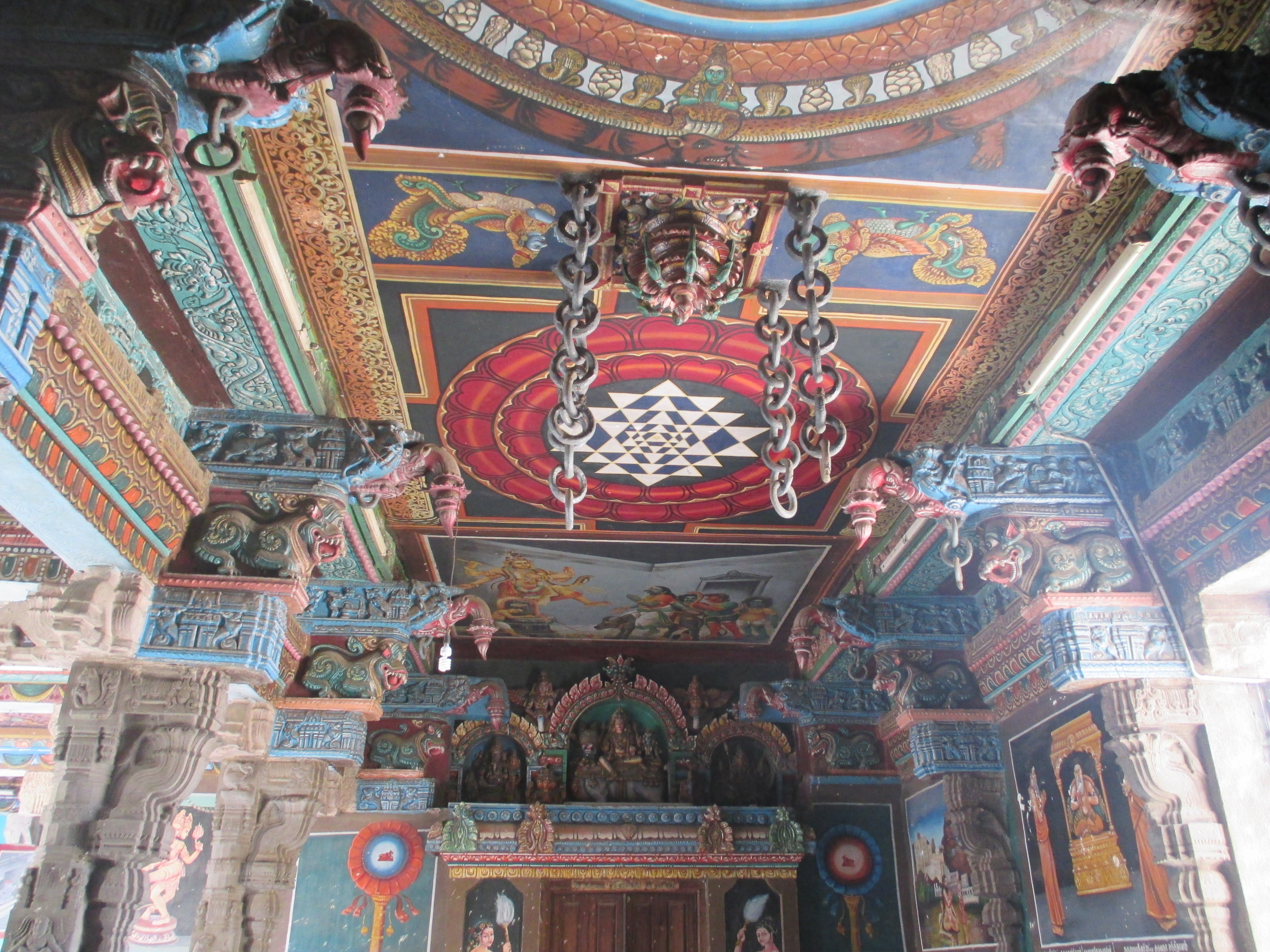
Ceiling with stonechains

The temple priests perform the pooja (rituals) daily. Like other Shiva temples of Tamil Nadu, the priests belong to the Shaivaite community, a Brahmin sub-caste. The temple rituals are performed six times a day; Ushathkalam at 5:30 a.m., Kalasanthi at 8:00 a.m., Uchikalam at 10:00 a.m., Sayarakshai at 6:00 p.m., Irandamkalam at 8:00 p.m. and Ardha Jamam at 10:00 p.m. Each ritual comprises four steps: abhisheka (sacred bath), alangaram (decoration), neivethanam (food offering) and deepa aradanai (waving of lamps) for both Thayumanaswami and Mattuvar Kuzhal Amman. The worship is held amidst music with nagaswaram (pipe instrument) and tavil (percussion instrument), religious instructions in the Vedas read by priests and prostration by worshippers in front of the temple mast. There are weekly rituals like somavaram and sukravaram, fortnightly rituals like pradosham and monthly festivals like amavasai (new moon day), kiruthigai, pournami (full moon day) and sathurthi.

The temple celebrates dozens of festivals throughout the year. The Chittirai festival during the Tamil month of Chittirai (April - May) is celebrated for fifteen days, portraying the various incidents associated with the temple legend. The car festival is held on the ninth day, when the processional deities of Thayumanswamy and Mattuvar Kuzhalammai are taken out in separate chariots around the temple in NSB Road, Nandikovil Street, North and East Andar Streets and the Malaivasal. The Karthigai festival is celebrated during the Tamil month of Karthikai, between November and December, concluding with the celebration of Karthikai Deepam. A huge lamp is lit in a cauldron, containing three tons of ghee, at the top of the Malaikottai hills during the Deepam. To mark the occasion, the festival deity of Thayumanaswami circumambulates the mountain.

Every full moon, tens of thousands of pilgrims worship Thayumanaswami by circumambulating the Tiruchirappalli hill barefoot. The circumambulation covers the circumference around the hill, and is referred to as Girivalam. On the day of yearly Chitra Pournami, the full moon of the Tamil calendar, hundreds of thousands of pilgrims come from across the world to worship Thayumanaswami.

== Saints and literary mention ==
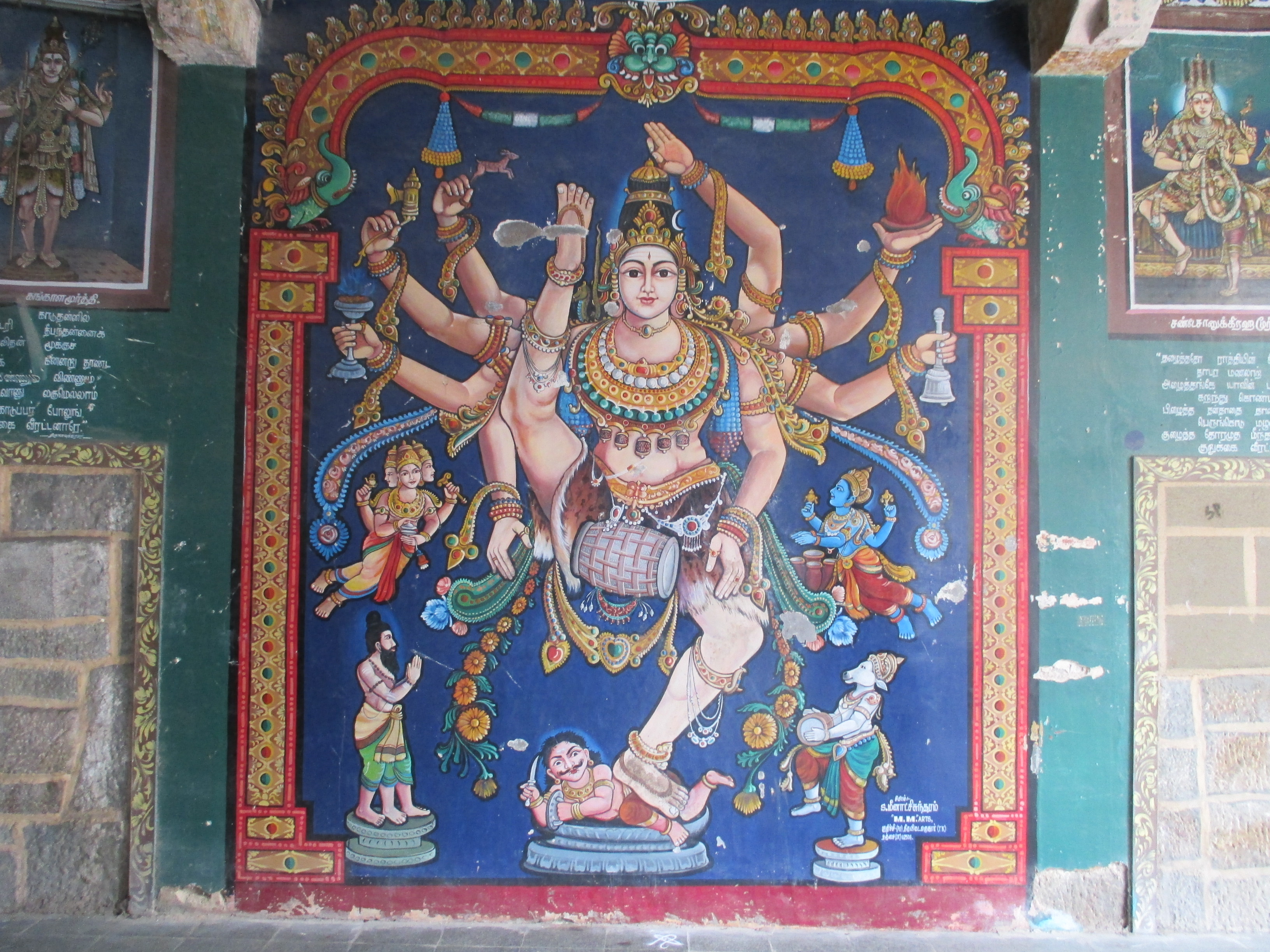
Paintings on the wall of hall leading to the sanctum.

Tirugnana Sambandar, a 7th-century Tamil Saivite poet, venerated Thayumanavar in eleven verses in Tevaram, compiled as the First Tirumurai. Appar, a contemporary of Sambandar, also venerated Thayumanavar in 10 verses in Tevaram, compiled as the Fifth Tirumurai. As the temple is revered in Tevaram, it is classified as Paadal Petra Sthalam, one of the 276 temples that find mention in the Saiva canon. Muthukumaraswamy in the temple is revered in Tirupugazh, the hymns of Arunagirinathar, a 15th-century saint. Thayumanavar (1705–1742), a Saiva Siddantha saint has glorified the presiding deity in his verses. There is a mutt named after the saint in the South Street of Rockfort, which celebrates his annual birth anniversary.
