= Tiruchirappalli Rock Fort =

Fort and temple in Tiruchirappalli, India

Tiruchirapalli Rock Fort
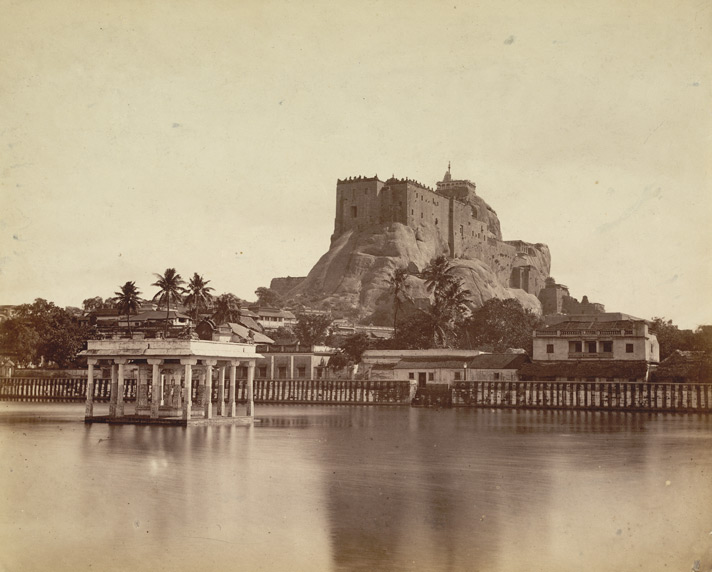
- Interactive map of the Tiruchirapalli Rock Fort area

General information
- Architectural style: Tamil
- Location: Tiruchirappalli, India
- Coordinates: 10.828°N 78.697°E
- Construction started: Various times since 580
- Cost: Unknown
- Owner: Archaeological Survey of India, Government of Tamil Nadu

Technical details
- Structural system: Indo Saracenic Dravidian Architecture.

Design and construction
- Architects: Various (Pallavas, Cholas, Madurai Nayaks)
- Engineer: Unknown

Website
- www.tn.gov.in/trichytourism/temples.htm

Tiruchirappalli Rock Fort, locally known as Malaikottai, is a historic fortification and temple complex built on an ancient rock. It is located in the city of Tiruchirappalli, on the banks of river Kaveri, Tamil Nadu, India. It is constructed on an 83 metres (272 ft) high rock. There are two Hindu temples inside, the Ucchi Pillayar Temple, Rockfort and the Thayumanaswami Temple, Rockfort. Other local tourist attractions include the famous Pallava-era Ganesha temple and the Madurai Nayak-era fort. The fort complex has witnessed fierce battles between the Madurai Nayakas and Adil Shahi dynasty of Bijapur, Carnatic region and Maratha Imperial forces. The fort played an important part during the Carnatic Wars, helping lay the foundations of the British Empire in India. The Rockfort is the most prominent landmark of the city.

== History ==
The name "Rockfort" comes from frequent military fortifications built here, first by the emperors of the Vijayanagara Empire and later by the British Empire during the Carnatic Wars. The oldest structure in the fort is a cave temple built by the Pallavas under Mahendravarman I (c. 580–630 CE, temple likely from the later part). During the Chola period, the nearby town of Woraiyur was their capital. Still, the Pallavas did not keep control of this strategic city and lost it to the Pandyas. The Cholas reasserted themselves in the 10th century. Trichy continued to be in their possession until the decline of the empire, after which it became a Vijayanagara stronghold.

In the mid 14th century, the region was controlled by the Delhi Sultanate after Malik Kafur's raid on South India. They were ousted and the region came under the control of Vijayanagara. During the early part of the 16th century, the region came under the control of the Madurai Nayaks, the earlier governors of the Vijayanagara Empire. However, it was under the Nayaks of Madurai that Tiruchirapalli prospered in its own right and grew to be the city that it is today. The Madurai Nayaks constructed the Rock Fort Temple Lake along with major walls as foundations, establishing the town as a trading city and later, their capital. After the Nayaks, the fort palace was occupied by the invader Chanda Sahib, as he ruled in conjunction with the alliance with the Kingdom of France. He lost this command when the French lost to the British who seized the fort after the Carnatic wars. This enabled the British to gain a foothold in Tamil Nadu and later all of South India.

In modern times, the fort is maintained and administered by the Chennai Circle of the Archaeological Survey of India. The fort is one of the prominent tourist destinations in Tamil Nadu.

== Major battles ==
=== Nayak era ===
As the Rockfort was the capital of the Madurai Nayaks, the fort has witnessed fierce battles. One of the largest was the Battle of Toppur for supremacy between the Aravidu dynasty of Vijayanagara and the Madurai Nayaks. The former won, with support from the rulers of Mysore and Thanjavur in the 16th century. Later, the Nayaks faced fierce attacks from Adil Shahi, Mysorean and Imperial Maratha troops. The Fort complex formed the northwest territory to the Nayaks. During their two-century rule, they had occasional skirmishes with their neighbours, the Thanjavur Nayak kingdom, the Thanjavur Maratha kingdom, and, more frequently, with the invading Adil Shahi, Kingdom of Mysore, and Imperial Maratha armies.

=== Carnatic Nawabs ===
During the mid 18th century, Chanda Sahib, aided by the French, made this fort his home base. He battled with the combined forces of the Carnatic Nawab and British. He was defeated in the Carnatic wars and was forced to cede his lands to the British.

=== British periods ===
In the late 18th century, Hyder Ali was a major threat to the British, as were the French who were still fighting for their colonial supremacy in this region. By now, the town was firmly established as a Cantonment town and the fort's gate was known as Main Guard Gate. Robert Clive lived near the tank when he was in Tiruchirappalli.

== Geology ==
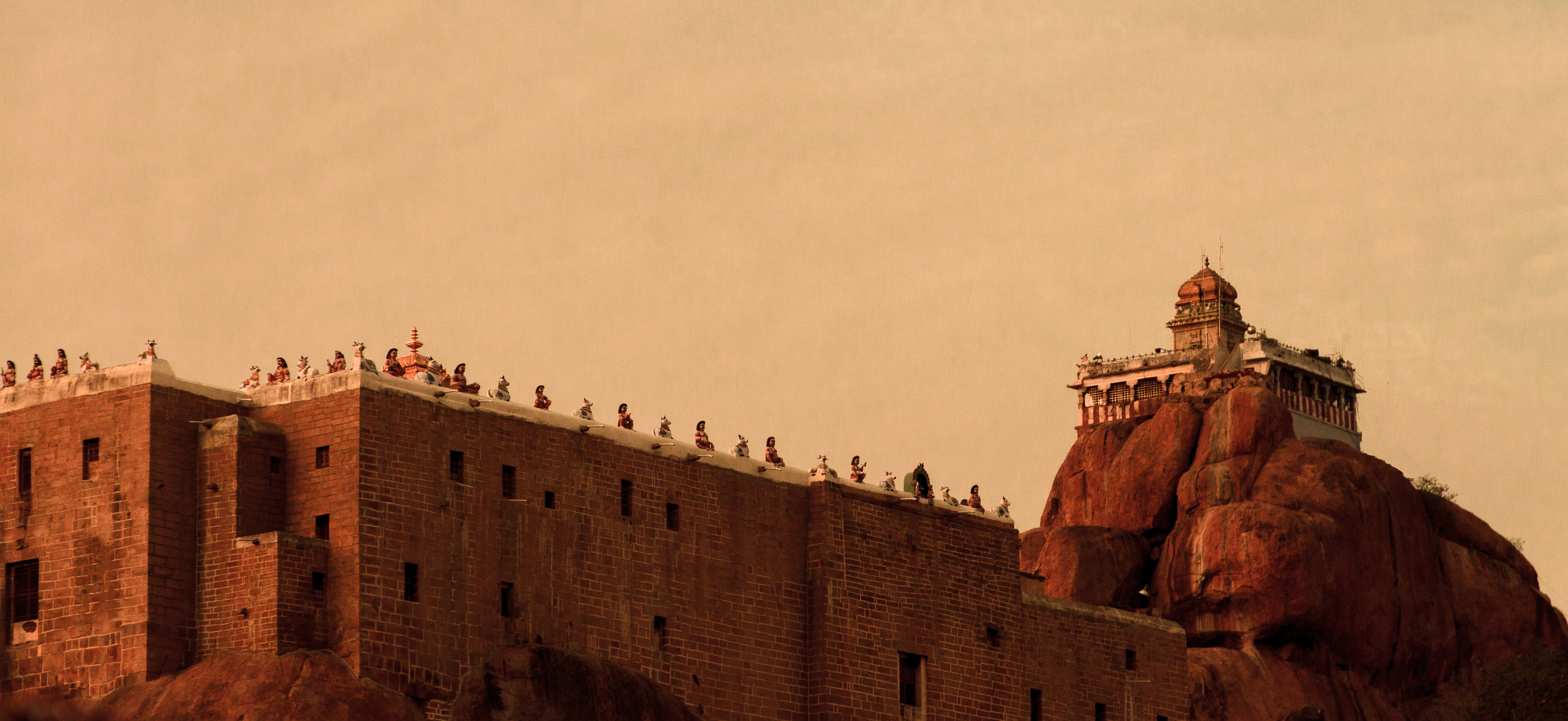
Tiruchirapalli Rock Fort

The rock is said to be one of the oldest formations in the world. It is 3.8 billion years old, making it as old as the rocks in Greenland and older than the Himalayas. Quartz, used in glass making, and feldspar, used in ceramics, are found in this rock formation. The Rock Fort Temple is situated on 83-metre-high outcrops. The Pallavas initially built this temple, but the Nayaks used its naturally fortified position and designed it again. It is a long climb up the 344 steps cut into the stone to the top.

== Temples ==
There are five temples on the rock fort:

- the Lalitankura Pallavesvara Griham, also called the Upper Cave
- the Lower Cave
- the Manikka Vinayakar temple at the foot of the hill, dedicated to Lord Ganesha
- the Ucchi Pillayar Temple at the top of the hill, dedicated to Lord Ganesha
- the Thayumanaswami Temple, Rockfort, literally "the lord who became the mother",? is a large 18th-century temple. It is dedicated to Shiva, goddess Amman, and there is a shrine for the 18th-century Nayaka-era saint, Tayumanavar. It is on the way, as one climbs the steps to Ucchi Pillayar Temple.

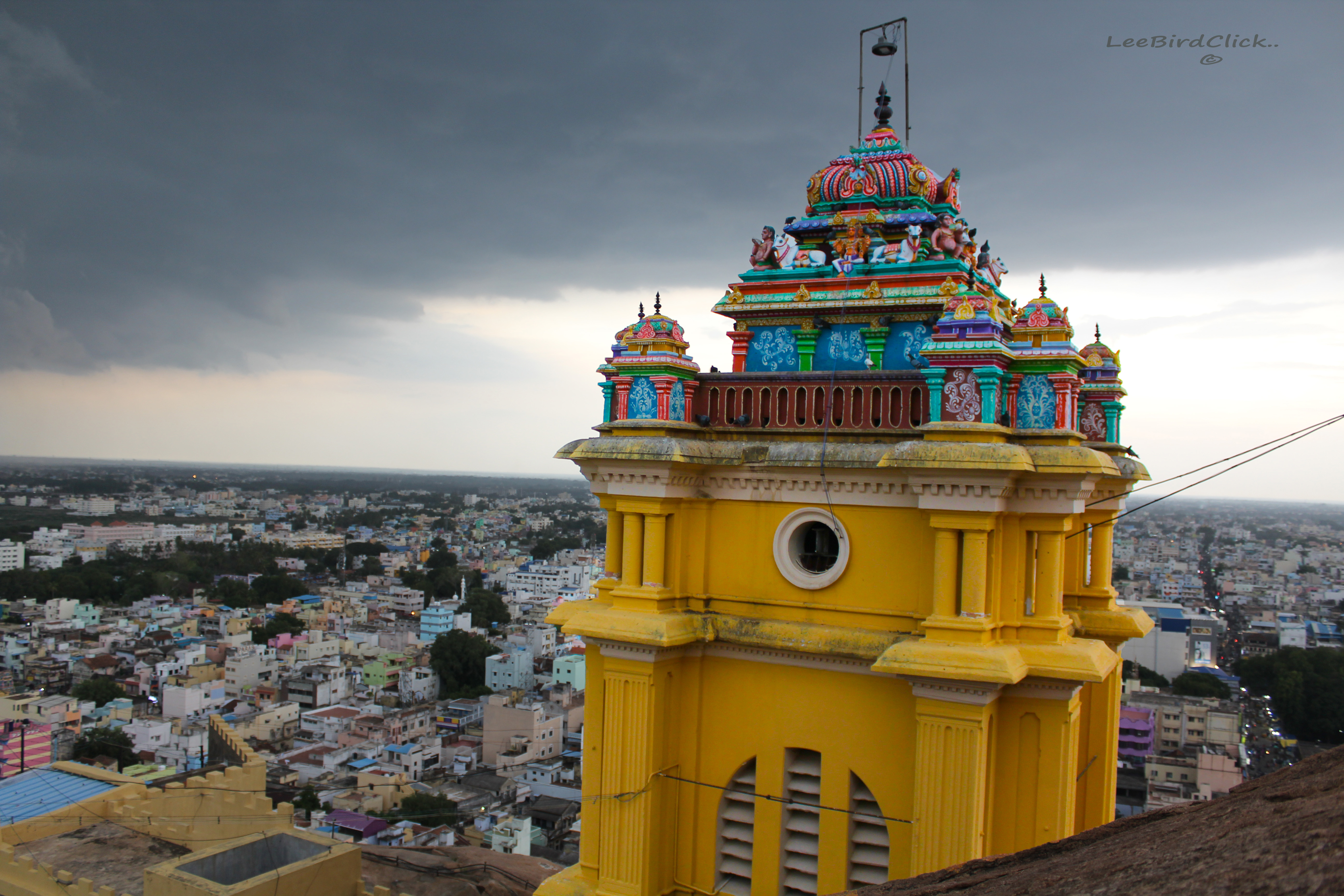

=== Rock-cut temple ===
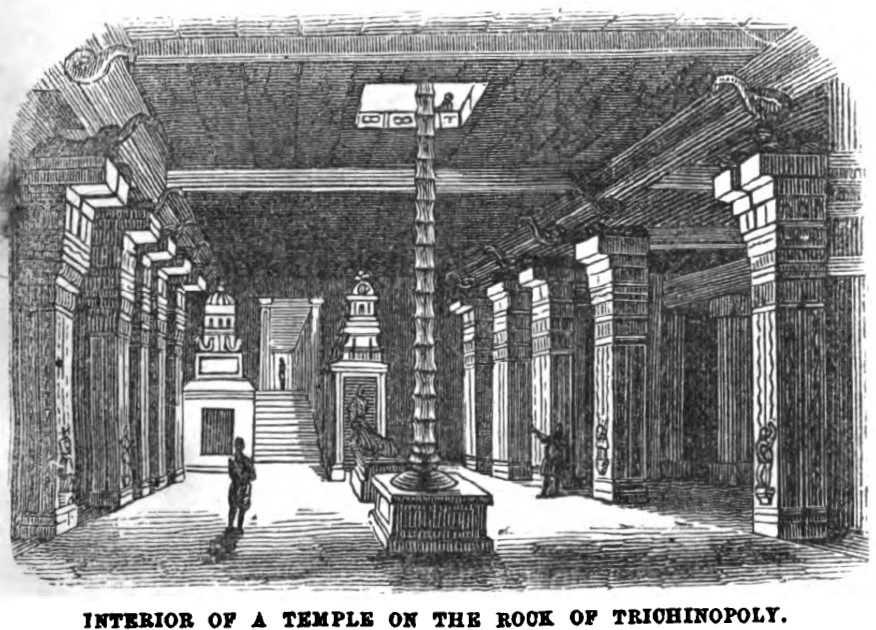
Interior of a Temple on the Rock of Trichinopoly (1847)

There are two rock-cut temples in the fort, one in the lower part of the fort called Lower Cave Temple and the other called the Upper Cave Temple; it is in the complex after the Thayumanaswamy temple on the way up, on the left before the Uchi Pillayar Kovil. The temples are similar to that of other rock-cut temples, the Pundarikakshan Perumal Temple at Thiruvellarai and Pechipalai cave temple. The Upper Cave has an important Sanskrit inscription of Mahendravarman I, that is much debated.

The rock-cut temple in the hill temple complex was built during the Pallava era and is named Lalitankura Pallaveswaram, with several inscriptions attributed to Mahendravarman I. The Cholas, the Vijayanagara emperors and the Nayaks of Madurai have made extensive contributions here. The two-storey-tall Taayumaanava temples are considered to be a masterpiece of construction.

== See also ==
- Tiruchirappalli Fort
- Rockfort Express
