= Alfred Fisher (rugby league) =

English rugby league player

Personal information
- Born: c. 1924
- Died: May 1986 (aged 62)

Playing information
Club
Years	Team	Pld	T	G	FG	P
1947–52	Castleford	68	18	0	0	54

Alfred Fisher was a professional rugby league footballer who played in the 1940s and 1950s. He played at club level for Castleford.
