= Alfred Fischer (judge) =

German judge

Alfred Fischer (14 December 1919 – 17 June 2004) was a German judge. He served on the Federal Administrative Court from 1966 until 1987.

Most recently he was chairman of the 2nd Senate (officials and staff representation rights). He was a commentator for staff representation rights. In the early 1990s he worked as a trust officer in the Treuhandanstalt.
