= The RajaSaab (soundtrack) =

2026 soundtrack album by Thaman S

- Soundtrack album cover

Soundtrack album by Thaman S
- Released: 9 January 2026
- Recorded: 2024–2025
- Genre: Feature film soundtrack
- Length: 24:36
- Language: Telugu
- Labels: T-Series; Saregama
- Producer: Thaman S

Thaman S chronology
Akhanda 2: Thaandavam (2025)	The RajaSaab (2026)	S Saraswathi (2026)
External audio
- The RajaSaab (Telugu) – Audio Jukebox on YouTube

The RajaSaab is the soundtrack album composed by Thaman S to the 2025 Telugu-language fantasy horror comedy film of the same name directed by Maruthi and produced by People Media Factory and IVY Entertainment, starring Prabhas, Sanjay Dutt, Nidhhi Agerwal, Malavika Mohanan, Riddhi Kumar and Zarina Wahab. The soundtrack featured six songs with lyrics written by Ramajogayya Sastry, Krishna Kanth, Kasarla Shyam, Adviteeya Vojjala, Asura, Faruk Kaiser and Raqueeb Alam. The soundtrack featuring five songs was released through T-Series on 9 January 2026, the same day as the film.

== Development ==
The film's soundtrack is composed by Thaman S in his first collaboration with Prabhas and third with Maruthi after Mahanubhavudu (2017) and Prati Roju Pandage (2019). He started working on the film's music by May 2024, and headed to Mamallapuram and Pondicherry for the composition. Thaman described the film's soundtrack as a "massy album" that consisted of six songs.

Initially, Thaman had composed a set of songs much earlier, but as the production took longer than expected, he had to scrap all the older tunes and come up with newer songs. Hence, Thaman started to recompose the tunes by March 2025, considering the fact the music company had to invest a hefty amount on the film's soundtrack and had to work pan-India. He started watching the final edit, to get an idea for composing the tunes.

Thaman's initial plan for the album had few special songs, including a remix and also composing tunes for the Japanese version, for a wide audience appeal. But after re-composition, the soundtrack for the film, featured an introduction song, duet, a theme song and an item number. Thaman initially scrapped plans for a remix song and decided a special number catered for Prabhas' fans. Reportedly, the team planned to remix a yesteryear song but backed off due to price negotiations. However, the song "Auva Auva Koi Yahan Nache Nache" from Disco Dancer (1982), originally composed and sung by Bappi Lahiri and Usha Uthup was remixed specifically for the film, as "Nache Nache".

The music rights were acquired by T-Series for ₹30–40 crore (US$3.5–4.7 million).

== Release ==
The first single, titled "Rebel Saab", was released on 23 November 2025 at a special premiere show in Mythri Vimal Theatre in Hyderabad and released online that evening. The second single, titled "Sahana Sahana", was released on 17 December 2025 at an event held at Lulu Mall, Hyderabad. The third single, titled "Raja Yuvaraje", was released on 31 December 2025. The fourth single, titled "Nache Nache", was released on 5 January 2026. The song is available only in Hindi and Tamil languages. The soundtrack was released on the same date as the film, on 9 January.

== Track listing ==
=== Telugu ===
No.	Title	Lyrics	Singer(s)	Length
1.	"Rebel Saab"	Ramajogayya Sastry	Sanjith Hegde, Blaaze	3:41
2.	"Sahana Sahana"	Krishna Kanth	Vishal Mishra, Thaman S, Sruthi Ranjani	4:23
3.	"Dil Mange More"	Kasarla Shyam, Adviteeya Vojjala	Nakash Aziz	4:25
4.	"Raje Yuvaraje"	Krishna Kanth	Baby Riya Seepana, Thaman S, Adviteeya Vojjala	4:12
5.	"Rebel Maniac"	Adviteeya Vojjala, Asura	Asura, Sahithi Adapa	3:30
Total length:				20:11

=== Hindi ===
No.	Title	Lyrics	Singer(s)	Length
1.	"Rebel Saab"	Kumaar	Sachet Tandon, Blaaze	3:41
2.	"Sahana Sahana"	Kumaar	Vishal Mishra, Thaman S, Sruthi Ranjani	4:23
3.	"Raje Yuvaraje"	Raqueeb Alam	Baby Shriya Pendyala, Thaman S, Adviteeya Vojjala	4:12
4.	"Rebel Maniac"	Adviteeya Vojjala, Asura	Asura, Sahithi Adapa	3:30
Total length:				15:46

Extended soundtrack
No.	Title	Lyrics	Singer(s)	Length
5.	"Nache Nache" (composed by Thaman S and Bappi Lahiri)	Faruk Kaiser, Raqueeb Alam	Nakash Aziz, Brinda, Usha Uthup	4:24
Total length:				24:36

=== Tamil ===
No.	Title	Lyrics	Singer(s)	Length
1.	"Rebel Saab"	G. Muralidharan	Deepak Blue, Blaaze	3:41
2.	"Sahana Sahana"	Ilango Krishnan	Dheeraj, Thaman S, Sruthi Ranjani	4:23
3.	"Raje Yuvaraje"	G. Muralidharan	Baby Shriya Pendyala, Thaman S, Adviteeya Vojjala	4:12
4.	"Rebel Maniac"	Adviteeya Vojjala, Asura	Asura, Sahithi Adapa	3:30
Total length:				15:46

Extended soundtrack
No.	Title	Lyrics	Singer(s)	Length
5.	"Nache Nache" (composed by Thaman S and Bappi Lahiri)	Faruk Kaiser, Ilango Krishnan	Arun Kaundinya, Prakruthi Reddy, Bappi Lahiri, Usha Uthup	4:24
Total length:				24:36

=== Malayalam ===
All lyrics are written by Nirmal MR.

No.	Title	Singer(s)	Length
1.	"Rebel Saab"	Nazeerudin, Blaaze	3:41
2.	"Sahana Sahana"	Dheeraj, Thaman S, Sruthi Ranjani	4:23
3.	"Raje Yuvaraje"	Baby Riya Seepana, Thaman S, Adviteeya Vojjala	4:12
4.	"Rebel Maniac"	Asura, Sahithi Adapa	3:30
Total length:			15:46

=== Kannada ===
No.	Title	Lyrics	Singer(s)	Length
1.	"Rebel Saab"	G. Santhosh Shinde	Sanjith Hegde, Blaaze	3:41
2.	"Sahana Sahana"	ASG	Dheeraj, Thaman S, Sruthi Ranjani	4:23
3.	"Raje Yuvaraje"	Varadaraj Chikkaballapura	Baby Shriya Pendyala, Thaman S, Adviteeya Vojjala	4:12
4.	"Rebel Maniac"	Adviteeya Vojjala, Asura	Asura, Sahithi Adapa	3:30
Total length:				15:46

== Background Score ==
The RajaSaab

Film score by Thaman S
- Released: 7 February 2026
- Recorded: 2024–2025
- Genre: film score
- Length: 16:58
- Language: Telugu
- Label: T-Series
- Producer: Thaman S

Thaman S chronology
Akhanda 2: Thaandavam (2025)	The RajaSaab (2026)	S Saraswathi (2026)

The RajaSaab(OST)
No.	Title	Length
1.	"The Rise of Rajasaab"	1:34
2.	"Raja Saab Steps In"	00:53
3.	"Sahana Sahana - Raja Saab's Love"	1:52
4.	"In Search of Nanamma"	1:52
5.	"Bhairavi - Shield of Raja Saab"	1:32
6.	"Gangadevi - The Royal Matriarch"	00:50
7.	"Bloodline of Betrayal"	2:23
8.	"The Cursed Raja Saab"	3:12
9.	"Raja Saab Vs The Beast"	2:50
Total length:		16:58

== Critical reception ==
Swaroop Kodur of The Indian Express wrote "Thaman S's music, too, works in isolation and manages to elevate certain moments, but it could never be the saving grace." Sruthi Ganapathy Raman of The Hollywood Reporter India wrote "Thaman's score, which is a cocktail of the indelible Harry Potter and Ratsasan themes, crudely brings us back to reality." Neeshita Nyayapati of Hindustan Times also opined the same, while the score being played in the "loudest decibel possible". Suresh Kavirayani of Cinema Express called Thaman's music as one of the biggest drawbacks, with "none of the songs leave a lasting impression" and the score being "often loud and intrusive". Balakrishna Ganeshan of The News Minute also admitted the same, with the songs being "forgettable" and the score being "loud" adding "little value beyond sheer noise." Sajin Shrijith of The Week also considered the score to be "so non-stop and aggressively loud" but also "familiar and boring".
