= FGN =

FGN may refer to:

- F. G. Natesa Iyer (1880–1963), Indian activist
- Family Game Night (TV series), an American game show
- Federal Government of Nagaland, former name of the Naga National Council
- FGN, guitar brand of Japanese musical instrument manufacturing company
