= S. Aishwarya =

- Born: S. Aishwarya
- Genre: Carnatic music,
- Occupation: Carnatic Classical Vocalists
- Years active: 2007–present

S. Aishwarya is a Carnatic musician, grand daughter of Carnatic vocalist Radha Viswanathan great grand daughter of M. S. Subbulakshmi

== Career ==
Aishwarya began her first lessons in early age of four under M. S. Subbulakshmi and Radha Viswanathan. She continued learning Carnatic music under her grandmother Radha Viswanathan almost for 18 years until her death on 2 January 2018.

In October 2017, Aishwarya & her sister Saundarya were invited by the Indian Prime Minister Narendra Modi to sing at his residence they sang composition "Maithreem Bhajatha" of the Mahaperiaval of Kanchi which was composed for World Peace and sung at the United Nations in 1966 by M. S. Subbulakshmi and Radha Viswanathan.

Aishwarya & her sister Saundarya perform together and they have given many classical music concerts in many prestigious venues across the world.

=== Awards and recognitions ===
Year	Honour	Honouring bestowed or presented by
2017	Yuva Kala Bharati	Bharat Kalachar, Chennai
2017	SVN Rao Award for Youth Excellence	Sri Rama Seva Mandali, Bangalore
2017	Vocational Excellence Award	Rotary Club, Chennai
2017	Young Woman Achiever Award	AMN Global Group, Chennai
2016	Ambassador of Classical Arts	Connecticut General Assembly, USA
2016	Best Young Carnatic Vocalist and Rising Star of Indian Classical Music	AMN Global Group, Chennai
2016	Young Achiever Award	A3 Foundation, Chandigarh
2016	M.S.Subbulakshmi Sangeetha Puraskar	M.S.Subbulakshmi Foundation, Varkala, Kerala
2016	M.S.Subbulakshmi Centenary Award	Trinity Fine Arts, Chennai
2016	Sangeetha Parampara Puraskar	Kalalaya, San Jose
2016	Kaveri Kannada Award	Kannada Koota, Washington DC
2015	Most Promising Artist of the Year – Dr.Chithra Narayanaswamy Award	Brahma Gana Sabha
2015	T.K.Govinda Rao Award	Sri Krishna Gana Sabha
2011	Madurai Mani Iyer Award	Sri Krishna Gana Sabha
