= Akhanda 2: Thaandavam (soundtrack) =

- Album cover

Soundtrack album by Thaman S
- Released: 28 November 2025
- Recorded: 2024–2025
- Genre: Feature film soundtrack
- Length: 31:22
- Language: Telugu
- Label: Aditya Music
- Producer: Thaman S

Thaman S chronology
Telusu Kada (2025)	Akhanda 2: Thaandavam (2025)	The RajaSaab (2026)
External audio
- Audio Jukebox on YouTube

Singles from Akhanda 2: Thaandavam
- 1. "The Thaandavam" Released: 14 November 2025; 2. "Jajikaaya Jajikaaya" Released: 18 November 2025

Akhanda 2: Thaandavam is the soundtrack album composed by Thaman S to the 2025 film of the same name directed by Boyapati Srinu, which is the sequel to Akhanda (2021) and starred Nandamuri Balakrishna. The film's soundtrack featured nine songs written by Kalyan Chakravarthy, Adviteeya Vojjala, Naga Gurunaatha Sharma and Kasarla Shyam. The album was released through Aditya Music on 28 November 2025, after being preceded by two singles.

== Development ==
The soundtrack album and background score were composed by Thaman S after previously associating with both the director and actor in the predecessor. In October 2025, Thaman stated that pandits Shravan Mishra and Atul Mishra would perform the Sanskrit shlokas featured in the background score. S. Aishwarya and S. Soundarya, the great granddaughters of Carnatic classical vocalist M. S. Subbulakshmi had performed two songs for the film, along with the Sarvepalli Sisters also contributing two songs. The film also featured songs performed by Shankar Mahadevan, Kailash Kher, Deepak Blue, Brijesh Shandilya, Shreya Ghoshal, S. P. Charan, Sri Krishna, V. M. Mahalingam, Divya Kumar, Arun Kaundinya, Adviteeya Vojjala, Sruthi Ranjani and Gotte Kanakavva. Thaman recalled that around 600 technicians worked in the music department, and the overall scoring process took around 77 days, while for the interval portions, they took around 11 days to score that particular sequence. The songs in the film featured spiritual elements, especially in "The Thaandavam" song which had lyrics dedicated to Lord Shiva being added in the last minute.

== Release ==
The first single titled "The Thaandavam" was released on 14 November 2025 at an event held at Dynamix Mall in Juhu, Mumbai. The second single titled "Jajikaaya Jajikaaya" was released at a grand launch event held at the Jagadhamba theatre in Visakhapatnam on 18 November. The film's soundtrack was launched at the pre-release event held at the Khaithlapur Ground in Kukatpally on 28 November, with the cast and crew in attendance. The album was distributed by Aditya Music.

== Reception ==
Sangeetha Devi Dundoo of The Hindu felt the background score being "relentlessly amped-up". Arjun Menon of Rediff.com wrote "Thaman really goes for it this time, composing a excessively loud, almost deafening score that injects some energy into the flatly conceived scenes." Sanjana Pulugurtha of The Times of India wrote "Thaman’s score tries to energise the narrative and succeeds in parts". T. Maruthi Acharya of India Today wrote "for all its flaws, one man holds the film together: Thaman. This is his year, and Akhanda 2 benefits enormously from it. His damru beats, chants, mass percussion, and ritualistic soundscape elevate scenes that would otherwise collapse under their own weight. Without Thaman, this film simply wouldn’t work." Zinia. B of Firstpost found the score to be "jarring".

== Track listing ==
No.	Title	Lyrics	Singer(s)	Length
1.	"Akhanda Thandavam"	Kalyan Chakravarthy	Sarvepalli Sisters	2:30
2.	"Gangadhara Shankara"	Adviteeya Vojjala	S. Aishwarya, S. Soundarya, Sruthi Ranjani	3:42
3.	"Shiva Shiva"	Kalyan Chakravarthy	Gotte Kanakavva, Sruthi Ranjani	4:04
4.	"Hara Hara"	Kalyan Chakravarthy	S. P. Charan, Sri Krishna	4:29
5.	"Shankara Shankara"	Kalyan Chakravarthy	V. M. Mahalingam, Divya Kumar, Deepak Blue, Arun Kaundinya	3:46
6.	"Shambho"	Adviteeya Vojjala	Adviteeya Vojjala, S. Aishwarya, S. Soundarya	2:52
7.	"Akhanda Haindhavam"	Naga Gurunaatha Sharma	Sarvepalli Sisters	2:48
8.	"The Thaandavam"	Kalyan Chakravarthy	Shankar Mahadevan, Kailash Kher, Deepak Blue	4:03
9.	"Jajikaaya Jajikaaya"	Kasarla Shyam	Brijesh Shandilya, Shreya Ghoshal	3:07
Total length:				31:22
