= Meera (1945 film) =

1945 film by Ellis R. Dungan

- Theatrical release poster
- Directed by: Ellis R. Dungan
- Written by: Kalki Krishnamurthy
- Produced by: T. Sadasivam
- Starring: M. S. Subbulakshmi
- Cinematography: Jitan Banerji
- Edited by: R. Rajagopal
- Music by: S. V. Venkatraman
- Production company: Chandraprabha Cinetone
- Distributed by: Narayanan & Company
- Release date: 3 November 1945
- Running time: 136 minutes
- Country: India
- Language: Tamil

Meera is a 1945 Indian Tamil-language historical musical film directed by Ellis R. Dungan, produced by T. Sadasivam and written by Kalki Krishnamurthy. Based on the life of the 16th century mystic and poet Mirabai, the film stars M. S. Subbulakshmi as the eponymous character, a zealous devotee of Krishna, who considers him to be her husband. Despite marrying Rana (Chittoor Nagayya), she follows her own way of living, which is unacceptable to her husband and his family.

Sadasivam was looking for a good story to produce a film that would make his singer wife Subbulakshmi's music available to the average person. Subbulakshmi chose the story of Meera. The film began production at Newtone Studio in Madras, but was filmed predominantly on location in North India in places like Jaipur, Vrindavan, Udaipur, Chittor and Dwarka to maintain credibility and historical accuracy.

Meera was released on 3 November 1945, Diwali day, and became a major critical and commercial success. This led to the production of a Hindi-dubbed version, which had a few scenes reshot, that was released two years later on 21 November and also achieved success. Despite the Hindi version making Subbulakshmi a national celebrity, it would be her last film as an actress, after which she decided to focus solely on her musical career.

== Plot ==
During the reign of the Mughal emperor Akbar, young Meera, influenced by the story of Andal and Krishna, is so deeply in love with Krishna that she considers him to be her husband after she garlands him on an auspicious day as advised by her mother. As Meera matures into a young woman, her devotion to Krishna grows.

Against her wishes, Meera is married to Rana, the king of Mewar. But even after marriage, her love for Krishna remains unchanged. She follows her own ideals and way of living which are unacceptable to Rana and his family, especially his brother Vikram and sister Udha. Meera asks Rana to construct a temple for Krishna in Chittor, the capital of Mewar. Out of love for her, Rana agrees. An overjoyed Meera remains in the temple most of the time, singing praises of Krishna along with other devotees, and avoids staying at the palace.

On Vijayadashami, Rana expects Meera to be with him at the royal assembly when other kings come to offer their respects. But en route to the assembly, Meera hears Krishna's flute playing, returns to the temple and remains there. Rana becomes angry upon realising that Meera has returned to the temple again, ignoring her duties as a wife and queen. To kill Meera, Vikram has Udha give her a poisoned drink. Meera is saved by Krishna and the poison does not kill her; instead, Krishna's idol at the Vithoba Temple turns blue, and the sanctum's double-doors at Dwarakadheesh Temple close spontaneously, and remain closed.

At Delhi, Akbar learns of Meera's singing and her devotion to Krishna. He sends her a pearl necklace as a gift, which Meera puts on Krishna's idol. Rana becomes angry when he learns of these developments and her disinterest in fulfilling her duties as a wife and queen; he orders the demolition of the temple using cannons so that she will leave. Vikram goes to the temple and orders Meera and the other devotees to come out before the demolition begins. However, Meera refuses, remains in the temple and continues her bhajans.

Meanwhile, Rana learns from Udha of Vikram's failed attempt to kill Meera. Shocked when he realises Meera's real identity (she is one with Krishna), he rushes to meet her in the temple, which is about to be demolished. When a cannon is fired, Rana stops it and is injured. When Meera hears Krishna calling her, she admits to Rana that she has failed in her duties as a wife. She explains that her heart is with Krishna and seeks Rana's permission to leave palace life and fulfill her desire to visit Krishna's temple at Dwarka; Rana realises her devotion and agrees. Once Meera leaves, Mewar suffers from a drought and the subjects plead with Rana to bring Meera back, so Rana goes in search of her.

Meera first goes to Brindavanam and meets the sage, who originally predicted her devotion. Together, they leave for Dwarka, Krishna's birthplace. On reaching the temple, she starts singing in praise of Krishna. Rana, who has followed her, also reaches the temple. The temple's doors, which were closed till then, open. Krishna appears and invites Meera inside. Meera runs towards Krishna and falls dead while her soul merges with him. Rana comes rushing in and finds Meera's corpse. Her devotion to Krishna is finally rewarded, and Meera is united with him.

== Cast ==
Adapted from the opening credits:

- M. S. Subbulakshmi as Meera
- Chittoor Nagayya as Rana
- Radha as Young Meera
- Serukalathur Sama as Rupa Goswami
- K. Sarangapani as Udham
- T. S. Balaiah as Vikram
- K. R. Chellam as Udha
- T. S. Mani and M. G. Ramachandran as Jayamal
- K. Duraisami as Messenger Rao
- T. S. Durairaj as Narendran
- R. Santhanam as Surendran
- Baby Kamala as Krishna

== Production ==
=== Development ===
T. Sadasivam wanted to produce a film that would make his singer wife M. S. Subbulakshmi's music available to the average person, so he started looking for a good story. He had several discussions with friends like Kalki Krishnamurthy and was of the opinion that if Subbulakshmi was to act in a film, it could not be a mass entertainer, but would need to carry a universal and uplifting message. After much deliberation, Subbulakshmi chose the story of the 16th-century mystic and poet Mirabai alias Meera. Sadasivam decided to produce the film entirely on his own under the Chandraprabha Cinetone banner, and for the first time was not answerable to any financier, co-producer or co-partner. He chose Ellis R. Dungan to direct, while Krishnamurthy was hired as screenwriter. Jitan Banerji was the cinematographer and R. Rajagopal the editor. This would be the second film based on Mirabai, the first being the 1938 film Bhakta Meera.

=== Casting ===
While Subbulakshmi was cast as Meera, her stepdaughter Radha was recruited to play the character's younger version. To prepare for the part, Subbulakshmi decided to go to all the places where Meera had wandered in search of the elusive Krishna, and worship at all the temples where she worshipped. Honnappa Bhagavathar was the first choice to play Meera's husband Rana. Although he accepted the offer, he was ultimately not hired. In a 1990 interview he recalled, "I had met Sadasivam, and after discussions he told me that he would make arrangements for an advance payment and agreement, but I never heard from him again." Dungan refused a suggestion to cast P. U. Chinnappa as he felt the actor was "uncouth" and lacked the "regal presence" needed for the role. Dungan successfully recommended Chittoor Nagayya, who he felt "proved the right choice for a Rajput king".

The husband-and-wife comedy duo N. S. Krishnan and T. A. Mathuram were supposed to have appeared in Meera. However, Krishnan was arrested in December 1944 as a suspect in the Lakshmikanthan murder case, and he was replaced by T. S. Durairaj, who portrayed Narendran; Madhuram did not remain on the project. T. S. Mani and M. G. Ramachandran shared the role of a minister named Jayamal. This was the only film in which two future Bharat Ratna laureates (Ramachandran and Subbulakshmi) acted. Baby Kamala, a girl, was chosen to act as the male Krishna.

=== Filming ===
Production began in 1944 at Newtone Studio in Madras, before moving to North India, particularly Rajasthan, for location shooting. According to filmmaker and historian Karan Bali, Dungan and Banerji "did a series of elaborate lighting tests on a specially created bust of [Subbulakshmi]. They shot the bust using different camera heights and angles with varied lighting schemes. They then studied the developed rushes to decide what worked best for Subbulakshmi's face structure." Shooting locations included Rajasthan's capital Jaipur, in addition to Vrindavan, Udaipur, Chittor and Dwarka. The decision to shoot in these locations was Dungan's, who cited the need to be "credible and historically accurate".

At Udaipur, Sadasivam required some royal elephants and horses for the shooting schedule. After Sadasivam made the request to the Maharana of Udaipur, the Maharana agreed to help the crew with whatever they needed beyond elephants and horses. Dungan recalled in his autobiography:

Due to the kindness and assistance of the Maharana's prime minister, we were given carte blanche to film practically anything and anywhere in and around the palaces and gardens [...] We were also granted the use of such facilities as the royal barge, elephants, a royal procession, the palace dancing girls, hundreds of film "extras" and all of the water fountains in and around the palaces. These were ready-made sets and would have cost us a fortune to reproduce in a studio setting, if they could be reproduced at all.

While filming at Dwarka, Dungan could not enter the Krishna temple where permission to shoot the film had been obtained, as he was not a Hindu. Hence, he disguised himself as a Kashmiri Pandit and was let in. Another scene required Meera to cross the Yamuna in a boat; the boat was to capsize and she would be saved by Krishna, who would appear in the guise of a boatman. While filming the scene, Subbulakshmi accidentally hurt her head and fell unconscious; the crew barely rescued her from drowning. The final length of the film was 10,990 feet (3,350 m).

== Soundtrack ==
The soundtrack was composed by S. V. Venkatraman, and released under the His Master's Voice label. The song "Kaatrinile Varum Geetham", written by Krishnamurthy, is set in the Carnatic raga known as Sindhu Bhairavi, and based on "Toot Gayi Man Bina", a Hindi-language non-film song composed by Kamal Dasgupta and sung by Sheila Sarkar. While historian Randor Guy claimed that Krishnamurthy suggested the tune to Venkatraman, another historian V. Sriram says Krishnamurthy's daughter Anandi pestered for him to write a Tamil version of the song. "Brindhavanatthil" and "Engum Niraindhaaye" are also set in Sindhu Bhairavi, while "Giridhara Gopala" is set in Mohanam.

Track listing
No.	Title	Singer(s)	Length
1.	"Aranga Un Mahimayai"	M. S. Subbulakshmi	3:21
2.	"Brindhavanatthil"	M. S. Subbulakshmi	3:17
3.	"Charaa Charam"	M. S. Subbulakshmi	4:21
4.	"Devika Tamizh Naattinele"	M. S. Subbulakshmi	3:30
5.	"Enathullamae"	M. S. Subbulakshmi	3:04
6.	"Engum Niraindhaaye"	M. S. Subbulakshmi	2:12
7.	"Giridhara Gopala"	M. S. Subbulakshmi	2:32
8.	"Hey Harey"	M. S. Subbulakshmi	3:34
9.	"Ithanai Naalaana Pinnum"	M. S. Subbulakshmi	2:42
10.	"Kaatrinile Varum Geetham"	M. S. Subbulakshmi	3:03
11.	"Kandathundo Kannan Pol"	M. S. Subbulakshmi	3:20
12.	"Kannan Leelaigal"	M. S. Subbulakshmi	3:17
13.	"Maala Pozhuthinile"	M. S. Subbulakshmi	5:44
14.	"Maanilathai Vaazha Vaika"	M. S. Subbulakshmi	3:24
15.	"Maraindha Koondilirudhu"	M. S. Subbulakshmi	2:09
16.	"Maravene"	M. S. Subbulakshmi	2:25
17.	"Nandabala"	M. S. Subbulakshmi, Baby Radha	3:47
18.	"Thavamum Palithathamma"	M. S. Subbulakshmi	3:20
19.	"Udal Uruga" (verse)	M. S. Subbulakshmi	3:20
20.	"Vandaadum Cholai"	M. S. Subbulakshmi	6:15
21.	"Vinnum Mannum"	M. S. Subbulakshmi, V. Nagayya	2:45
Total length:			71:22

== Release and reception ==
Meera was released on 3 November 1945, Diwali day, and distributed by Narayanan & Company. The distributors ran front-page advertisements to announce "the musical movie of your dreams" and specifically to inform all fans that the film's "song hits" available on His Master's Voice. The film received rave reviews; The Free Press Journal said, "Meera transports us into a different world of bhakti, piety and melody. It shatters the misguided belief that film music is inferior. Subbulakshmi follows no stereotyped techniques in acting. She is just Meera." Kay Yess Enn of The Indian Express wrote on 10 November, "[Subbulakshmi] reveals a flair for histrionic heights in some scenes but in general, though showing great improvement on her previous efforts, there is scope for better work in emotional scenes." However, the magazine Picturpost (15 November) was more critical, saying the Meera bhajans were not "too pleasing to hear", the film lacked conviction, and realism and was not emotional enough. The reviewer felt Subbulakshmi, a Carnatic singer, was miscast as Meera, a Hindustani singer, and Dungan's direction was "bungling". The film was a major box office success; according to Smt. C. Bharathi, author of the 2008 book M. S. Subbulakshmi, this was largely due to the songs than the acting. The film has been screened at various film festivals including the Prague Film Festival, the Venice Film Festival and the Toronto International Film Festival.

== Hindi version ==
The success of Meera prompted Sadasivam to dub it in Hindi and having some scenes reshot. The Hindi-dubbed version was released on 21 November 1947, and achieved equal success, making Subbulakshmi a national celebrity. The film had an on-screen introduction by the politician and poet, Sarojini Naidu, who described Subbulakshmi as "The Nightingale of India". The premiere was inaugurated by Prime Minister Jawaharlal Nehru himself. Lord and Lady Mountbatten, Rajendra Prasad, Vijaya Lakshmi Pandit and Indira Gandhi attended the premiere as well. Nehru and the Mountbattens became Subbulakshmi's ardent fans, further propelling her fame. A reviewer from The Bombay Chronicle wrote:

More than the story of the Queen of Mewar who preferred a heavenly to an earthly diadem it is the voice of the star singing her bhajans and padas that is the picture's chief attraction [...] Narendra Sharma's lyrics embellish this photoplay, the story of which is from the pen of Amritlal Nagar. Subbulakshmi's admirers will find this film highly entertaining.

Despite the success of Meera, it was Subbulakshmi's last film as an actress, after which she focused solely on her musical career.

== Legacy ==
Meera is considered as a musical cult film of Tamil cinema. The scene where young Meera transforms into her older self, and the transition is shown with the song, "Nandha Balaa En Manalaa..", became a milestone in Indian cinema for its filmmaking technique. On the April 2013 centenary of Indian cinema, IBN Live (later known as News18) included Meera on its list of the 100 greatest Indian films of all time.

== Bibliography ==
- Bharathi, Smt. C. (9 May 2008). M. S. Subbulakshmi. Sapna Book House. ISBN 9788128007347.
- Dhananjayan, G. (2014). Pride of Tamil Cinema: 1931–2013. Blue Ocean Publishers. OCLC 898765509.
- Dwyer, Rachel (2006). Filming the Gods: Religion and Indian Cinema. Routledge. ISBN 978-1-134-38070-1. OCLC 878593281.
- Gangadhar, V. (2002). M.S. Subbulakshmi: The Voice Divine. Rupa Publications. ISBN 9788171678907. OCLC 607561598.
- George, T. J. S. (2016). M.S. Subbulakshmi: The Definitive Biography. Aleph Book Company. ISBN 9789384067601.
- Rajadhyaksha, Ashish; Willemen, Paul (1998) [1994]. Encyclopaedia of Indian Cinema. British Film Institute and Oxford University Press. ISBN 0-19-563579-5.
- Sundararaman (2007) [2005]. Raga Chintamani: A Guide to Carnatic Ragas Through Tamil Film Music (2nd ed.). Chennai: Pichhamal Chintamani. OCLC 295034757.
- Viswanathan, Lakshmi (2003). Kunjamma: Ode to a Nightingale. Roli Books. ISBN 9788174362735. OCLC 55147492.
