= H. H. The Rajah's College, Pudukkottai =

Autonomous educational institution in Tamil Nadu, India

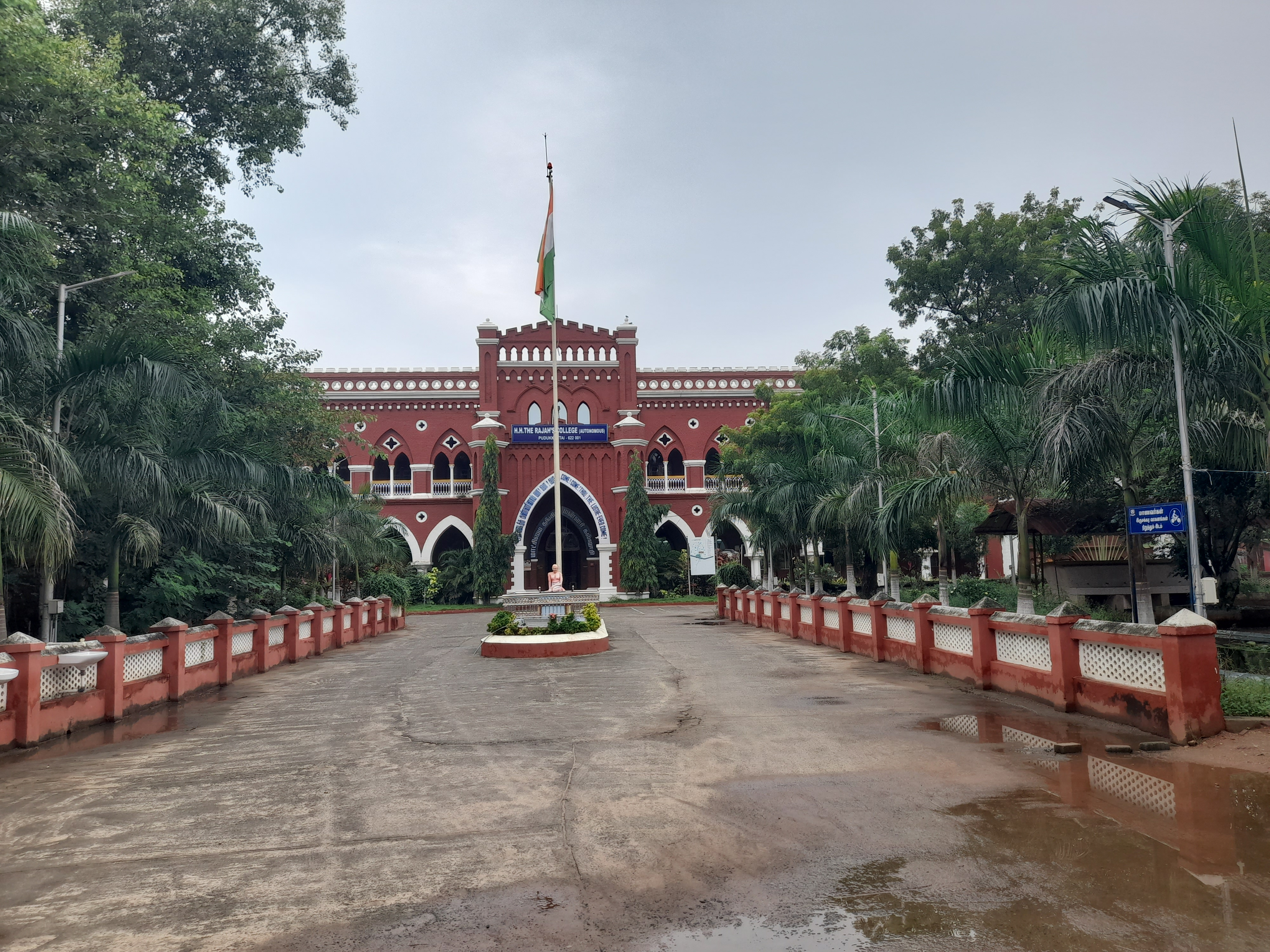
- Other names: HHRC
- Motto in English: "From darkness into light!"
- Type: State Government College
- Established: 1857
- Affiliations: Bharathidasan University
- Principal: B. Bhuvaneshwari
- Academic staff: 80
- Administrative staff: 10
- Students: 4500
- Undergraduates: 3700
- Postgraduates: 800
- Location: Pudukkottai, Tamil Nadu, India; 10.372943°N 78.816945°E
- Campus: Rural
- Language: Tamil, English
- Colours: Red and blue
- Sporting affiliations: Sports Authority of India, Sports Development Authority of Tamil Nadu
- Website: hhrc.ac.in

His Highness The Rajah's College is an autonomous educational institution in the town of Pudukkottai in Tamil Nadu, India. Founded by Ramachandra Tondaiman, the Raja of Pudukkottai State in 1857, it is the foremost arts and science college in the town. It is affiliated with Bharathidasan University.

== History ==
The H.H. The Rajah's College was first established in the year 1857, as Maha Rajah's free English medium school. The Maharaja Free English school produced its first batch of matriculation students in 1880 and started its first intermediate courses in 1891. The Head Master of the Maharajah Free English Medium School Mr. S. Narayanaswamy Ayyar was appointed as the first principal when the school was upgraded to a college.

During the tenure of Mr. S. T. Ramachandra Sasthiri, as the Principal (1912 – 1920) courses like history, chemistry, mathematics, accountancy, Tamil and Sanskrit were taught to the students. A hostel for boys was constructed in 1921. In order to provide vocational training (technical skills) to the students, motor rewinding course was offered in 1928.

In 1946, graduate courses were introduced and the college was affiliated with the Madras University. In the year 1968, M.Com. Degree Course was started in the college. B.A. English was first started in the year 1980. Subsequently, M.A. History and M.Sc. Mathematics were introduced in 1981 and 1982 then in 1984, B.Com. degree course was offered in the Evening College Stream.

The H.H. The Rajah's College was affiliated with the newly established Bharathidasan University Trichirappalli in 1982. From the academic year 1989–1990 onwards, M.Phil., M.Com. and M.A. (History) courses were introduced followed by M.A. Economics and B.Sc. Physical Education in 1990-91. Ph.D. courses were introduced between 1992 and 1993 and B.Sc. Computer Science was offered in 1996.

The H.H.The Rajah's College was declared as an Autonomous College by the University Grants Commission in the academic year 1999–2000. The college which was awarded the 3 Star Status by the National Assessment and Accreditation Council (NAAC) between 1999 and 2000, was then declared as the "B" Grade College by NAAC between 2005 and 2006. Later in 2011, University Grants Commission was given the extension offer of Autonomy to this campus.

== Departments ==
This college offers more than 20 degrees in different concentrations. Every faculties were working as research faculty in this campus. Each departments were governed by respective head of the departments. The various departments of specialization are:

- Botany
- Business Administration
- Chemistry
- Commerce
- Computer Science
- Economics
- English
- Hindi
- History
- Mathematics
- Physical Education
- Physics
- Tamil
- Zoology.

== Notable alumni and faculty ==
- G. Ganapati Sastriar, Diwan of Pudukkottai State in 1926 and from 1929 to 1931 studied at H. H. The Rajah's College, Pudukkottai.
- Gemini Ganesan better known by his stage name Gemini Ganesan, was an Indian film actor who worked mainly in Tamil cinema. He was sports_nicknamed "Kadhal Mannan" (King of Romance) for the romantic roles he played in Tamil films.
- T. V. Mahalingam, acclaimed historian who was part of the history faculty at The H. H. The Rajah's College. Later, he headed the Department of Ancient History and Archaeology at the University of Madras from 1959 to 1971.
- Muthulakshmi Reddy was an Indian medical practitioner, social reformer and Padma Bhushan award receiver. Muttulakshmi Reddy was appointed to the Madras Legislative Council in 1927.
- U. Sagayam is an Indian civil servant who currently serves as Vice Chairman of Science City Chennai. He is an IAS officer in the Tamil Nadu cadre, noted for his anti-corruption activities.
- S. Satyamurti was an Indian independence activist and politician. He was acclaimed for his rhetoric and was one of the leading politicians of the Indian National Congress from the Madras Presidency.

== See also ==
- Maharaja's College, Kochi
- Maharaja's College, Mysore
