= G. Ganapati Sastriar =

Indian civil servant and administrator

Rao Saheb Gangadhara Ganapati Sastriar was an Indian civil servant and administrator who served as Diwan of Pudukkottai state from 25 October 1926 to 15 December 1926 and 28 February 1929 to 4 March 1931.

== Early life and education ==
Ganapati Sastriar was born on 5 March 1876 at Thiruvalangadu in the then Tanjore district to T. Gangadhara Sastri and his wife Janakiamma. Sastriar was educated at H. H. The Rajah's College, Pudukkottai from 1882 to 1892 and graduated from St. Joseph's College, Tiruchirappalli in 1894.

Sastriar was the elder brother to F. G. Natesa Iyer: one of the leading figures of the Indian National Congress during the Indian independence movement, from South India. Sastriar initially studied at Raja's College, Pudukottai, then at St. Joseph's College, Tiruchirapalli (1893–94): before getting a degree in law from Madras Law College.

The then Government of India conferred on him the title Rao Saheb on 1 March 1929. After retiring from Government service in 1931, he served as a member of the senate of the University of Madras from 1933 to 1936.
