= F. G. Natesa Iyer =

Indian actor and independence activist

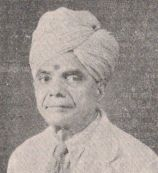
- Born: 11 November 1880; Pudukkottai, Pudukkottai State, British India
- Died: 23 January 1963 (aged 82); Bhopal, Madhya Pradesh, India
- Known for: Founder of 'Rasika Ranjana Sabha'

F. Gangadhara Natesa Iyer (11 November 1880 – 23 January 1963) was an Indian activist in the Indian National Congress during the Indian independence movement. He was also one of the pioneers of modern Tamil drama and Tamil cinema. He was a talent scout who recognized merit and promoted many youngsters, who went on to become great performers in Carnatic music.

== Early life and background ==
Natesa Iyer was born on 11 November 1880, to Janakiammaiyar Sastri (Pudukkotamma) and Gangadhara Shastri, who was the legal advisor to the then Pudukkottai state, a princely state in the Indian subcontinent under British colonial rule. Iyer's elder brother was Rao Saheb G. Ganapati Sastriar, who went on to hold the position of Dewan of the Pudukottai state. The family claimed lineage from Appayya Dikshita. Iyer's love for music and theatre made him run away from home at the age of ten, to join the railways as a clerk in the Madura and Tinnevelly - Quilon Railways construction department.

In an article written by his grandson, it is claimed that as a child, "He took shelter with Englishmen who brought him up and converted him to Christianity. Twenty years later, dissatisfied with the ability of the priests to clarify his doubts, he met the Kanchi Shankaracharya, and, getting satisfactory answers from him, reconverted to Hinduism." The Shankaracharya referred to was Paramacharya Chandrashekarendra Saraswati. It is recorded in a conversation he had in June 1923, that based on his twenty years of experience and knowledge of the Christian religion, "the Hindu religion was our mother and it was not appropriate to abandon your mother." Iyer also is reported to have stated that he was unfortunate to have committed such a sin, but realized his folly in time and he did not like to see anyone else commit the same mistake.

== Public career ==
Iyer spent much of his formal career as a railway officer with the South Indian Railway Company (S. I. R). He retired as a District Traffic Superintendent in 1935, the first Indian to occupy this position. The company was incorporated in England, with the stocks and shares quoted on the London Stock Exchange. South Indian Railway had its administrative headquarters at Tiruchirappalli. Iyer built his house in Tiruchirappalli and spent much of his life in this city.

Iyer was a member of the Indian Congress Party and represented the city as a delegate to the annual Indian National Congress sessions during the years of World War I. He joined the Indian National Congress in 1914, and was a delegate at the sessions in Bombay (1915), Lucknow (1916), and Madras (1917). In the Lucknow session he was a member of the Subjects Committee and took part in the discussion on the Congress - Indian Muslim League scheme of reforms. At its Madras session in 1917, he was a delegate from Trichinopoly, an elected member of the All India Congress Committee, a member of the Subjects Committee and had the honour of moving the resolution on indentured labour at the open sessions. He was a supporter of the Indian Home Rule Movement of those years and a party to the passive resistance resolution passed at the Madras Provincial Conference following the internment of Mrs. Annie Besant, George Arundale, and B. P. Wadia.

Iyer was the district commissioner of the Boy Scouts Association in India in 1922. In this capacity he was presented to the then Prince of Wales (later Edward VIII) at the World Scout Jamboree held at Madras.

Iyer has been credited as being "the first elected Indian chairman of Tiruchi Municipality.". This is now named Tiruchirappalli City Municipal Corporation

He was elected councillor of Trichnopoly Municipal Council for a number of years. A research paper on Tamil revivalism in the 1930s described Iyer as a leader of importance, who had been "an autocratic but effective chairman of the Trichnopoly municipality in the 1920s". His name surfaced in the 1936 conflict in the nomination by the Tamil nadu Congress Committee, of Mr.P.Retnavelu Thevar,for the post of the Chairman Tiruchi Muncipal Council. He was defeated by an internal rebel candidate,W.Ponniah Pillai. This was cited as the historical precedent for the "conscience vote", in the 1969 Indian presidential election, when the rebel candidate V. V. Giri defeated the official party candidate Neelam Sanjiva Reddy.

His notability in those years between the two world wars could perhaps be assessed by his appearance in the "Who's who in Madras Presidency" in 1937.

He continued to take some interest commenting on the Indian Congress politics in the city until the 1950s.

== Personal belief and faith ==
Iyer was very close to Advaita Vedanta scholars and saints such as Chandrashekarendra Saraswati. The Indian National Congress, in the decade of the 1920s, started organising the Non-Cooperation Movement, which involved getting many people to protest on the streets. F.G. Natesa Iyer, the leading Congress activist of Tiruchirappalli then, as also the elected Mayor, took this opportunity to convert the movement to also show support for the Chandrashekarendra Saraswati. He described the occasion, thus: "I was nominated by the public as the chairman of the Reception committee for arranging a reception for the Acharya of Sri Kanchi Kamakoti Peetam. As the municipal chairman, it was my duty to provide a proper welcome and respect to Swamigal who was visiting after a long time. The opportunity to welcome His Holiness in a manner that was exponentially greater than receptions given to kings and viceroys, was accorded to me, along my with supporters Sri MKandaswamy Servai, lawyer Sri. R. Srinivasa Iyengar and the larger public. The procession that was seven miles long, was preceded by seven groups of nadaswaram players, three band groups, four elephants, many horses and camels, instrumental players, Bhajan singers, Seva Samitis. I had the blessing to hold the front side of the ivory palanquin where our guru for the whole world, Sri Sankaracharya Swamigal was seated. He gave darshan to numerous people lined on both sides of the roads, in every floor, irrespective of their religion, caste or creed. There was no count of arathis, Poorna kumbams, garlands, asthika goshams. The procession that started at 6 pm ended at 10 pm in front of the mutt at Thiruvanaikaval. I was enthralled in my service to Swamigal as service to Lord Shiva himself".

Iyer also appears to have had a good rapport with Ramana Maharshi and his ashram. Iyer also was an admirer of Sivananda Saraswati. His homage is printed in a publication brought out by the Divine Life Society.

It can perhaps be inferred that Iyer belonged to the Smarta Tradition of the Vadama sub-sect of the Iyer community of Tamil Brahmins, who based their personal philosophy on Advaita Vedanta. The claim of lineage from Appayya Dikshita, who was a noted expositor and practitioner of the Advaita Vedanta school of Hindu philosophy, with a focus on Shiva, perhaps is further evidence of Iyer's personal philosophy.

== Theatre ==
Iyer is credited with being the founder of an amateur theater group, Rasika Ranjana Sabha, in Tiruchirappalli in 1914. . The Rasika Ranjana Sabha has been historically classified along with the Madras-based Suguna Vilasa Sabha, the Kumbakonam-based Vani Vilas Sabha and Thanjavur-based Sudarshan Sabha for encouraging native "histrionic talent" in the Madras Presidency during the times when the British Raj ruled. There exist some records of the English plays staged by the Rasika Ranjana Sabha. In 1915 at the Trichinopoly Collector's bungalow, Sheridan's play 'Pizzaro' was acted in aid of the Ladies' War Fund. The predominantly British audience were stated to have been amazed at the excellent diction of the all-Tamil cast. In 1918, two plays were staged as part of the peace celebrations organised by the Carnatic Infantry. In 1918, "At Home" was given to Mr. Blackstone, Deputy Superintendent of Police, and the same drama troupe presented a few plays. Iyer specialised in Shakespearean roles such as Hamlet and Othello. He was also famous for his production of and acting in Tamil social and mythological plays. In a recent foundation day celebration of the RR Sabha, he was hailed the "Father of modern Tamil dramas". There is an account that he organised the first ever public concert of M. S. Subbulakshmi, when she was eleven years of age, in the 100 pillar hall inside the Rockfort Temple, Tiruchirappalli. with Mysore Chowdiah on the violin and Dakshinamurthy Pillai on the mridanga. Actors such as the TKS Brothers, M. G. Ramachandran, M. R. Radha, and M. K. Radha in the starting days of their career looked up to Iyer as their ideal and sought his help in furthering their talents and prospects. It is reported that the TKS Brothers got their first big break in the world of theatre through Natesa Iyer casting them in the roles of Lava and Kusha, in a similarly named play produced and staged by Rasika Ranjana Sabha.

Iyer had written a concept paper for an academy of dance, drama and music, presented at the All India Oriental Conference (Hyderabad session), in the pre-independence days. This seems to be one of the precursory inputs to the Sangeet Natak Akademi, The National Academy for Music, Dance and Drama.

== Talent spotting ==
Iyer is credited with spotting the talent of the actor M. K. Thyagaraja Bhagavathar. One story is that he heard the young boy singing at a bhajan. Impressed with his talent, Iyer offered him the role of "Lohitadasa" in his play Harischandra, with the permission of Thyagaraja's father. Thyagaraja, who was ten at the time, agreed, and the play was a success. Through Rasika Ranjana Sabha, he also started getting trained under the guidance of theater veterans at that time in Trichy. Some stories also credit him with spotting the talent of K. B. Sundarambal, who, as a child, earned her living through begging and singing in railway trains for alms and copper coins around Trichy. There are also stories that Iyer organised the first ever public concert of M.S. Subbulakshmi. This was apparently in 1927, when Subbulakshmi was eleven years old. The performance was arranged in the 100 pillar hall inside theRockfort Temple, Tiruchirappalli, with Mysore Chowdiah on the violin and Dakshinamurthy Pillai on the Mridangam. An article on Natesa Iyer claimed that well known Carnatic artistes such as "Marungapuri Gopalakrishna Iyer, Madurai Mani, Palghat Mani, and Semmangudi, owed much to him for their success in their early careers". Specifically, there is a reference to Natesa Iyer spotting the talent of Musiri Subramania Iyer in 1916, when Musiri was seventeen years old, at his inaugural concert in Trichy. Natesa Iyer presented Musiri with a gold medal at his inaugural concert and predicted a bright future.

=== Acting career ===
Iyer acted in one Tamil movie Seva Sadanam. This movie was directed by K. Subramanyam in the year 1938. Seva Sadanam was an adaptation of Bazaar-e-Husn, a novel written by Premchand. Iyer played the lead role of "Eashwara Iyer", opposite M. S. Subbulakshmi, who starred in the movie as "Sumathi". This was M.S. Subbulakshmi's debut to the world of cinema. The film became famous for its social reform agenda. The veteran Marxist leader N. Sankaraiah described Seva Sadhanam as an "unusual film" for choosing the subject of marriages between young girls and old men (which had social sanction). According to him, the film successfully brought out the "sufferings of the girl" and the "mental agony of the aged husband". Sankariah particularly appreciated Iyer's performance in the role of the old man, which he said "was impressive".

In one sequence, Iyer is struck with remorse and throws away in sheer disgust his Yagnopaveetham; the sacred threads a Brahmin wears as an iconic symbol of his faith and community.

== Death and legacy ==
Iyer died at the house of his daughter Tirupurasundari at Bhopal, in January 1963. His body was cremated at Ram Ghat in the Bhopal Lake with military honours.

Iyer's role as Eashwar Iyer, the aged husband to the young Sumathi, played by M. S. Subbulakshmi in the Tamil movie Sevasadanam, has been stated to be "a turning point in the history of Tamil cinema. In the climax, the aged husband, now a totally changed man, was shown as casting aside with utter contempt his 'sacred thread', which symbolises his Brahmin superiority. It came as a stunning blow to the then Brahmin orthodoxy"(in pre independent South India, which was socially dominated by the Brahmin community).

The precocious child talent he unearthed and shaped through Rasika Ranjana Sabha, such as M. K. Thyagaraja Bhagavathar and K. B. Sundarambal, turned out to be the first superstars of Tamil cinema. He is credited with providing the first break for public performances for well known artistes like M. S. Subbulakshmi and the TKS Brothers, when they were yet adolescents. His name has been associated with promoting concert talent in Carnatic music, of what would become some of the well-known names of the twentieth century: Marungapuri Gopalakrishna Iyer, Musiri Subramania Iyer, Madurai Mani Iyer, Palghat Mani Iyer, and Semmangudi Srinivasa Iyer. Perhaps his biggest legacy would be the Rasika Ranjana Sabha, which he founded in Tiruchirappalli, and into which he poured much of his wealth. The Sabha celebrated its centenary of existence in a year long celebration across 2015–16.

=== Padma Swaminathan ===
One of his daughters, Padma, did much to carry his legacy in the world of social service and the performing arts. Married to a young freedom fighter T.S.Swaminathan, Padma carried the spirit of Natesa Iyer to the next generation. As a political activist, Mrs. Padma Swaminathan came into her own in the Congress Seva Dal, where she was mentored by S. Ambujammal Desikachari: and managed a group of 200 volunteers in Srinivasa Gandhi Nilayam, Chennai in the 1940s. An archive photograph shows Mrs. Padma Swaminathan leading a procession of women volunteers on August 15, 1947, holding a giant national flag in Madras, with the Munroe Statue in the background. . At the age of 40, she earned her Sangeeta Vidwan degree from the Central College of Carnatic Music in Chennai, learning from stalwarts like Musiri Subramania Iyer and T. Brinda. Mrs. Padma herself was an All India Radio artiste for 40 years, and has trained innumerable students in classical music. She was also an accomplished veena player, and was closely associated with Kalakshetra Foundation. She encouraged her sons to marry promising young musicians. These daughter in laws, Dr.N. Rajam and Mrs. Vani Jairam are now considered legends in their respective fields.

== Rasika Ranjani Sabha ==
The Sabha got an award for the best Sabha in mofussil centre in 2011–12. This award was given by the leading social worker Sarojini Varadappan, in her capacity as Chairperson of the Mylapore Academy, for staging the maximum number of dramas in the entire state of Tamil Nadu for the year 2011–12.

The Sabha organises a special function on Iyer's birth anniversary to honor well-known personalities in the field of music, dance and culture. In the foundation day ceremony of 2011 he was hailed as the "Father of modern Tamil dramas". Veteran Tamil theater actors credit Rasika Ranjani Sabha for ensuring the survival of the Tamil theater art form in the 21st century, amidst competition from television and cinema.

RR Sabha has been conducting music competitions since 1984 to encourage students learning both vocal and instrumental music. The Sabha has been conferring the coveted title "SANGEETHA SRI" to the outstanding competitor in senior age group from 1991 onwards. Some of the present frontline performers of Carnatic music would have been given this award in the starting days of their career. Mr. A. Natarajan, former Chennai station Director of Doordarshan observed in a function at the Sabha in 2008, that "RR Sabha had been supporting aspiring singers in tier II cities and providing a chance to the music-lovers of the city to attend the concerts of ace musicians."

At the inauguration of the centenary celebrations of the Rasika Ranjani Sabha, on 16 May 2015, a special function was organised to release a special postmark and special envelope by the Indian Post. The speakers paid rich tributes to Natesa Iyer for his outstanding contribution to the promotion of drama, art, and culture and recalled his efforts to provide opportunities to the young drama artists and musicians, realising the impact of fine arts on the mind and soul of the masses. Mr. G. Natarajan, Director of Postal Services (Central region), noted that Natesa Iyer had groomed great artists, including S.G. Kittappa, M.K. Thiyagaraja Bhagavathar, and T.R. Mahalingam. The late Natesa Iyer had taken a long-term vision by founding the sabha. The sabha had groomed a number of artists in their early career to such an extent that they turned to be popular artists later. It was stated that the RR sabha formed part of the history of Tiruchi. The only survivor of FG Natesa Iyer's children, Mrs. Padma Swaminathan, aged 97 then, was present on the occasion.

The valedictory function of the centenary celebration, on Saturday 2 April 2016, saw more praise for the Rasika Ranjani Sabha. The role being played by Rasika Ranjani Sabha in promoting art and culture was highlighted by speakers. They said the sabha has set a new trend in conservation and promotion of art and culture among the different age groups. Chitra Visweswaran, member secretary, Tamil Nadu Iyal Isai Nataka Mandram, delivered the valedictory address. She summed up the achievements of the Rasika Ranjani Sabha thus: "Apart from honouring artistes, the sabha has been instrumental in recognising the services of institutions by presenting awards or citation to All India Radio and Tiruchi District Drama Artistes Association. The sabha had not confined itself to any particular art but has been encouraging artistes belonging to different planes such as Hari Katha discourse exponents, kaniyan koothu, Nama sangeerthanam and various dying arts. The sustained effort by the Sabha for over a century in organising concerts and encouraging artistes was its specific achievement". M. S. Mohamed Masthan, noted drama artiste, observed in this valedictory function, "The sabha has been a catalyst for the drama artistes in nurturing their talents and the annual week-long drama festival has been a gift to the artistes".

Next to Chennai, Tiruchi has (become) a prominent seat of promoting art and culture among the Tier II cities in the state.
