= Kalki Sadasivam =

Indian freedom fighter

- Marriage photo of Sadasivam and M. S. Subbulakshmi, circa. 1940
- Born: Thiagaraja Sadasivam; 4 September 1902; Aangarai, Trichinopoly, Madras Presidency, British India
- Died: 21 November 1997 (aged 95); Chennai, Tamil Nadu, India
- Occupations: writer, journalist, freedom fighter, singer, film producer
- Spouse(s): Apithakuchambal (d. 1938); M. S. Subbulakshmi (m. c. 1940)
- Children: Radha Viswanathan; Vijaya Rajedran; S Thyagarajan (adopted)

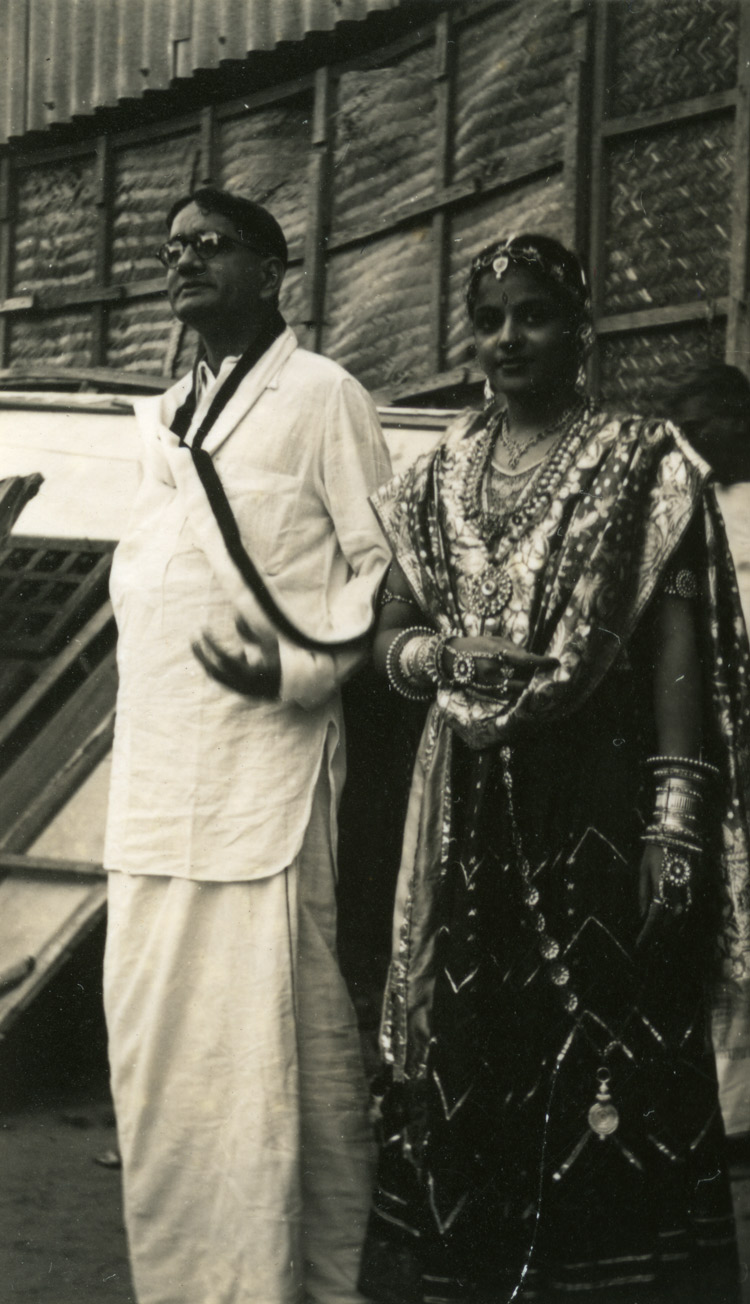
Kalki, the producer of the movie Meera with his wife and lead actress, M. S. Subbulakshmi at the studio in 1945.

Thiagaraja Sadasivam (4 September 1902 – 21 November 1997), better known as Kalki Sadasivam, was an Indian freedom fighter, singer, journalist and film producer who was one of the founders, along with Kalki Krishnamurthy of the Tamil magazine Kalki. He is well known as the husband of famous classical carnatic singer M.S. Subbulakshmi.

== Life ==
Kalki Sadasivam was born in a Tamil Brahmin family on 4 September 1902 at Aangarai in Tiruchirapalli District, the third of 16 children of Tyagarajan and Mangalam Iyer. His maternal uncle was Aswathy Narayanan Iyer. Impressed by the fiery speeches and writings of Lala Lajpat Rai, Bipin Chandra Pal, Lokamanya Tilak and Aurobindo Ghosh, Kalki Sadasivam joined the freedom movement at an early age and being a disciple of Subramaniya Siva desired to kill an Englishman and court imprisonment for the sake of it. As a result, he quit school and enlisted in the Bharata Samaj, serving Subramaniya Siva, who was afflicted with leprosy and ardent in involving himself in the Swadeshi Movement. On listening to speeches by Rajagopalachari and Mahatma Gandhi he later adopted non-violence.

Sadasivam had two daughters, Radha Vishwanathan and Vijaya, from his first wife, Smt. Apithakuchambal, who died in 1938. In July 1936, Sadasivam met the famous singer M.S. Subbulakshmi, who subscribed to his ideological and political views. The two eventually married on 10 July 1940, after his first wife died. Radha later started accompanying her stepmother Subbulakshmi as a backup singer at her performances and later became a popular musician in her own right.

Sadasivam worked for the Tamil publication Anand Vikatan in the 1930s. He was a close friend of journalist and writer Kalki Krishnamurthy, with whom he co-founded the popular magazine Kalki in 1940. Sadasivam's nephew (sister's son) Ramachandran, known as Ambi in music circles, married Krishnamurthy's daughter Anandi. Sadasivam's two daughters, Radha and Vijaya, were married on the same day. Vijaya was married to Rajendran, son of Kalki Krishnamurthy.

Sadasivam died in 1997 at the age of 95, and his final rites were carried out in Chennai by his adopted son, S Thyagarajan.
