= T. V. Mahalingam =

Indian historian (c. 1907–1983)

Therazhundur Venkataraman Mahalingam
- Born: 1907; Therazhundur, Tanjore district, Madras Presidency, British India (now in Mayiladuthurai district, Tamil Nadu, India)
- Died: 6 March 1983; Madras (now Chennai), Tamil Nadu, India
- Occupation(s): Historian, Academic, professor, author

Therazhundur Venkataraman Mahalingam (c. 1907 - 6 March 1983) was an Indian historian who is known for publishing the most authoritative descriptive catalogues on the Mackenzie manuscripts.

== Early life ==
Mahalingam was born in Therazhundur in Tanjore district in 1907. Following his graduation, Mahalingam worked as a lecturer in the Madurai College and later at the H. H. The Rajah's College in Pudukkottai. In 1947, Mahalingam joined the faculty of the Department of Ancient History and Archeology, as the Professor of Ancient History and Archeology at the University of Madras.

== As University of Madras faculty ==
Mahalingam worked as a history professor under the leadership of K. K. Pillay till 1959. When the Department of Indian history and archaeology was split into two new departments - Department of Indian History and Department of Ancient History and Archaeology in 1959, Pillay remained head of the Indian history department while Mahalingam was promoted to head the newly created Department of Ancient History and Archaeology, a post which he held to retirement in 1971.

== Death ==
Mahalingam died on 6 March 1983 at the age of 75 in Madras.

== Honours ==
Mahalingam was awarded the Padma Shri by the Government of India in 1969.

== Works ==
- Mahalingam, T. V. (1940). Administration and social life under Vijayanagar. University of Madras.
- Mahalingam, T. V. (1951). The Banas in South Indian history. University of Madras.
- Mahalingam, T. V. (1952). Economic life under the Vijayanagar empire. University of Madras.
- Mahalingam, T. V. (1965). The Nagas in Indian history and culture. G. S. Press.
- Mahalingam, T. V. (1967). Early South Indian palaeography. University of Madras.
- Mahalingam, T. V. (1967). South Indian polity. University of Madras.
- Mahalingam, T. V. (1969). Kanchipuram in early South Indian history. Asian Publishing House.
- Mahalingam, T. V. (1970). Studies in the South Indian temple complex. Karnatak University.
- Mahalingam, T. V. (1972). Mackenzie Manuscripts: Summaries of the Historical Manuscripts in the Mackenzie Collection. University of Madras.
- Mahalingam, T. V. (1976). Readings in South Indian history. B. R. Publishing Corporation.
