= Sevasadanam =

1938 Indian Tamil film by Krishnaswami Subramanyam

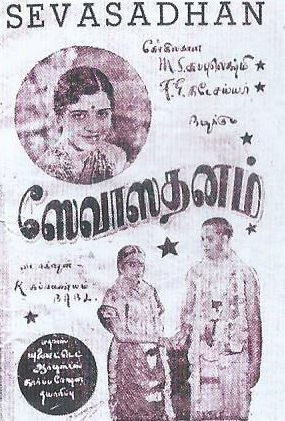
- Poster
- Directed by: K. Subramanyam
- Written by: Premchand; K. Subramanyam
- Produced by: K. Subramanyam
- Starring: M. S. Subbulakshmi; F. G. Natesa Iyer; S. G. Pattu Iyer; S. Varalakshmi
- Cinematography: Sailen Bose; Ellappa; Rama Rao
- Edited by: Dharam Veer Singh
- Music by: Papanasam Sivan
- Release date: 2 May 1938
- Running time: 210 minutes
- Country: India
- Language: Tamil

Sevasadanam (transl. House of Service) is a 1938 Indian Tamil-language drama film directed by K. Subramanyam. It is one of the early Tamil films to be set in a contemporary social setting and to advocate reformist social policies. This was the first film for M. S. Subbulakshmi and the Tamil debut of Telugu actress S. Varalakshmi.

== Plot ==
An abused wife Sumathi (M. S. Subbulakshmi) is driven out of her house by her husband and later forced into prostitution. Through her efforts, she changes her circumstances and devotes her life to running an institution caring for the children of prostitutes.

== Production ==
After the success of Balayogini (1937), director Subramanyam was encouraged to make more socially oriented films. In 1938 he decided to make a film version of Premchand's novel Bazaar-e-Husn and bought the rights for ₹4,000 (worth ₹7.2 million in 2021 prices). While Balayogini was about the travails of widows, Sevasadanam dealt with domestic abuse, prostitution and women's liberation. Subramanyam wrote the screenplay himself and made the film under his Madras United Artists Corporation banner. The completed film was 18,900 feet in length with a run time of 210 minutes.

== Cast ==
- M. S. Subbulakshmi - Sumathi
- F. G. Natesa Iyer - Eashwara Iyer
- S. Varalakshmi
- S. G. Pattu Iyer
- Kumari Kamala
- "Jolly" Kittu Iyer
- Jayalakshmi
- Ram Pyari

== Reception ==
Sevasadanam was released on 2 May 1938. It was a critical and commercial success. Ananda Vikatan favourably reviewed the film on 8 May 1938:

We should always expect somethings from Subramaniam's direction – for instance depiction of social ills.. If we have to say only two words about this talkie based on Premchand's story it is – Go see (it).

As was the case with Balayogini, conservative Hindus were upset with Sevasadanam.

The veteran Marxist leader N. Sankaraiah, has described Seva Sadhanam as an "unusual film" for choosing the subject of marriages between young girls and old men (which had social sanction). According to him, the film successfully brought out the "sufferings of the girl" and the "mental agony of the aged husband". Sankariah particularly appreciated Natesa Iyer's performance in the role of the old man, which he said " was impressive". Tamil film critic and historian Aranthai Narayanan observes in his book Thamizh Cinemavin Kathai (The Story of Tamil Cinema) that "Seva Sadhanam proved a turning point in the history of Tamil cinema. In the climax, the aged husband, now a totally changed man, was shown as casting aside with utter contempt his `sacred thread', which symbolises his Brahmin superiority. It came as a stunning blow to the then Brahmin orthodoxy."

== Availability ==
No print of Sevasadanam is known to survive, making it a lost film. While K. Subramanyam's family only have a few surviving photographs related to the film in their possession, the complete set of 78 rpm gramophone records in their original envelopes has survived in the collection of musicologist V. A. K. Ranga Rao in Chennai.

== See also ==
- Tamil films of the 1930s
