= Bazaar E Husn =

2014 Indian film

- Theatrical release poster
- Directed by: Ajay Mehra
- Screenplay by: Dhananjay Kumar
- Story by: Munshi Premchand
- Produced by: A K Mishra
- Starring: Reshmi Ghosh; Jeet Goshwami; Yashpal Sharma; Om Puri
- Cinematography: Rajan Kinagi
- Edited by: Umesh Gupta
- Music by: Mohammed Zahur Khayyam
- Production company: Vision Corporation Ltd
- Distributed by: Vision Corporation Ltd
- Release date: 18 July 2014
- Country: India
- Language: Hindi

Bazaar E Husn (transl. The flesh market (as in prostitution)) is a 2014 Indian Hindi-language film, based on Munshi Premchand’s renowned Urdu novel Bazaar-e-Husn, released on 18 July 2014. This film stars Reshmi Ghosh, Jeet Goshwami, Om Puri and Yashpal Sharma, and was written by Dhananjay Kumar.

== Cast ==
Renowned TV star Reshmi Ghosh features in Bazaar-e-Husn as Suman. While Om Puri plays the role of her father Kishenchand. Actors like Jeet Goshwami and Yashpal Sharma play pivotal roles in the film.

- Reshmi Ghosh as Suman
- Jeet Goshwami as Sadan
- Om Puri as Kishanchand
- Yashpal Sharma as Gajadhar
- Rajeshwari Sachdev as Didi

== Music ==
1. "Pyaar Ki Duniya Basai Hai" - Udit Narayan, Kavita Krishnamurthy
2. "Har Shaam Nigaho Se Youn Jaam Chhalakte Hai" - Alka Yagnik, Kavita Krishnamurthy
3. "Maare Nainva K Baan" - Sunidhi Chauhan
4. "Toh Sang Raaji Nahi Balam Ji" - Bhaswati Ghosh
5. "Aaj Kaisi Ghadi Aai Hai Hamare Angana" - Bhaswati Ghosh
6. "Hamri Atariya Pe Aaja Sawariya" - Bhaswati Ghosh
7. "Jadugar More Naina Lute Dil Ka Chain" - Bhaswati Ghosh
8. "Aabru Laaj Saram" - Udit Narayan, Kavita Krishnamurthy

== Reception ==
- Bazaar-e-Husn: Banking on nostalgia By Johnson Thomas
- For soulful music and are a fan of Munshi Premchand, the film is worth watching once. By Jyoti venkatesh
