= Bazaar-e-Husn =

Book by Munshi Premchand

Bazaar-e-Husn (Urdu) / Sevasadan (Hindi)
- Author: Munshi Premchand
- Original title: Urdu: بازارِ حُسن, Hindi: सेवासदन
- Language: Hindustani
- Genre: Novel
- Publication date: Calcutta (Hindi, 1919) and Lahore (Urdu, 1924)
- Publication place: British India
- Media type: Print (Hardback & Paperback)
- Dewey Decimal: 891.4393

Bazaar-e-Husn (Urdu: بازارِ حُسن) or Seva Sadan (Hindi: सेवासदन, lit. 'The House of service') is a Hindustani novel by Premchand. It was the first novel published by Premchand.

It was originally written in Urdu under the title Bazaar-e-Husn ("Market of Beauty" or red-light district) but was first published in Hindi from Calcutta as Seva Sadan ("The House of Service"), in 1919. It was published in Urdu, in 1924, from Lahore.

Bazaar-e-Husn was Premchand's first major novel; he had previously published four novellas in Urdu of about 100 pages each.

An English translation was released by Oxford University Press, India in New Delhi in 2005, the year being the 125th anniversary of Premchand's birth.

== Synopsis ==
Bazaar-e-Husn is the tale of an unhappy housewife who is beguiled away from the path of domestic virtue into becoming a courtesan. She then reforms herself and atones by serving as the manager of an orphanage for the young daughters of courtesans, the seva-sadan of the Hindi title.

The setting is in the orthodox Hindu religious city of Varanasi, around the turn of the 20th century. The British Raj had introduced Local self-government in India to municipalities, in some cities. The main protagonist is a Brahmin lady named Suman who is married into a loveless union, because of her family's social and financial obligations. She leaves this marriage to become a courtesan, in the "kothas" of the city. In a twist to the tale, the local municipal corporation, a feature of the then-modernising India, orders these to be relocated outside the city, for social morality. Suman finds her social position is causing problems to her sister's marriage. She then joins to serve a home for widows, and teach them religion. When this becomes untenable — as also a stay with her sister who is married to a former admirer — Suman finally joins as a teacher, in a home that houses the children of former courtesans. The home is named Seva Sadan (the house of service), from which the title of the novel seems to be derived.

== Major themes ==
The novel seems to be located firmly in a place, Varanasi, and a time, the turn of the 20th century, when the British Raj started handing over power to local elites through municipalities, in some towns and cities.

While the Urdu title highlights the fall of the heroine, the Hindi title highlights her redemption: It is tempting to see the two titles as widely symptomatic of their respective literary cultures.

Vasudha Dalmia, an American academic of South Asian culture with special focus on the Hindi language, has written an introduction to the English translation. This details the context in which the novel is set: the ancient orthodox Hindu city of Varanasi and the spaces of the Kothis and the Benarasi courtesan is stated to be an interesting choice. The Benarasi courtesan filled an important place in the aesthetic and literary culture of North India — as well as in the cultural history of the city and its citizens.

In another paper, on the significance of this novel to the North Indian society and culture, Vasudha Dalmia points out that the title itself, Seva (service) and Sadanam (house), suggests the many layered social texture of Varanasi. The move to remove the courtesans from the heart of the city (Chauk) can be seen as a metaphor, for a new (North) India, which was seeking to modernise and refashion its image — removing courtesans from its heart and shifting them to the periphery.

Arshia Sattar in a review of the translation states that "Premchand has always used his women characters as the lens through which society is critiqued. A reading of his 'Sevasadan' in English translation almost 90 years after it was written brings home the fact that little has changed: women are still striving to control their own destinies."

== Adaptations ==
In 1934, director Nanubhai Vakil adapted Bazaar-e-Husn in the Hindi film Seva Sadan, starring Zubeida.

K. Subramaniam adapted the novel as a Tamil movie, Sevasadanam (1938), which was the first film for the famous Carnatic music singer, M. S. Subbulakshmi. Bazaar E Husn is a 2014 Indian Hindi-language film, based on the novel. Seva Sadan, a television film adaptation of the novel was broadcast by Doordarshan, the Indian national public broadcaster.
