= Radha Viswanathan =

Indian singer (1934 – 2018)

- Born: Radha Sadasivam; 11 December 1934; Gobichettypalayam, British India
- Died: 2 January 2018 (aged 83); Bengaluru, Karnataka
- Occupation: Carnatic vocalist
- Years active: 1940–2018
- Spouse: Guruswamy Viswanathan
- Children: 3
- Parent(s): Kalki Sadasivam (father); Apithakuchambal (mother) M. S. Subbulakshmi (stepmother)

Radha Viswanathan (11 December 1934 – 2 January 2018) was an Indian carnatic vocalist and classical dancer. She was the daughter of freedom fighter and journalist Kalki Sadasivam and stepdaughter of highly acclaimed Carnatic vocalist M. S. Subbulakshmi.

== Early life and career ==
Born on 11 December 1934 in Gobichettypalayam, Tamil Nadu, she was the eldest daughter of Thiagarajan Sadasivam and his first wife, Apithakuchambal. After the death of his first wife Apithakuchambal, her father married M. S. Subbulakshmi, who brought her up.

Radha accompanied her mother Subbulakshmi on stage since the age of five. She learned Bharatanatyam, making her arangetram (debut) in 1945. At the age of 21, Radha gave up dancing to concentrate exclusively on singing. She learnt Kritis and was also trained in Hindustani classical music.

She made her film debut portraying as Bharata in Shakunthala at the age of six.

== Personal life ==
Radha married Guruswamy Viswanathan and had two sons and a daughter.

In April 1982, Radha fell critically ill with tuberculosis meningitis and slipped into coma for three months.

=== Death ===
At the age of 83, Radha died in Bangalore in January 2018 due to breathing related complications.
