= M. S. Subbulakshmi =

Indian classical vocalist (1916–2004)

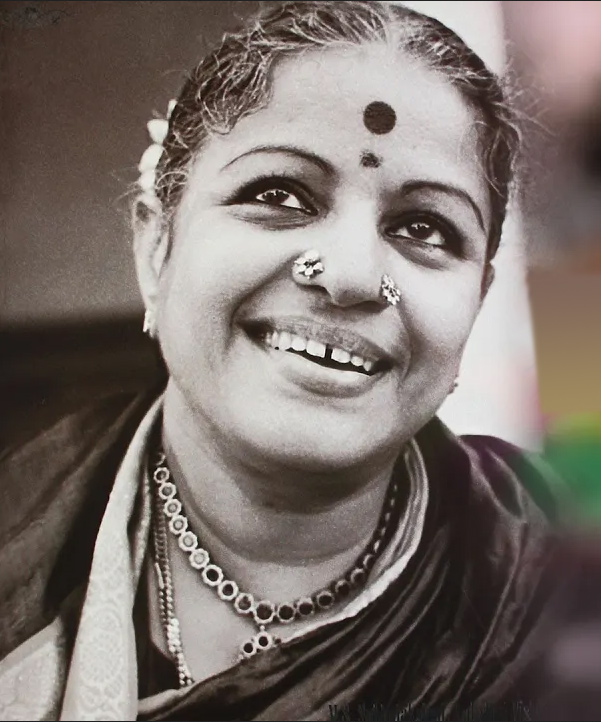

Background information
- Born: Madurai Shanmukhavadivu Subbulakshmi; 16 September 1916; Madurai, Madras Presidency, British India
- Died: 11 December 2004 (aged 88) Chennai, Tamil Nadu, India
- Genre: Indian classical music
- Occupations: Singer, Classical vocalist, Actress
- Years active: 1927–1997
- Label: His Master's Voice
- Spouse: Kalki Sadasivam (m. 1940; died 1997)

Madurai Shanmukhavadivu Subbulakshmi (16 September 1916 – 11 December 2004) was an Indian Carnatic singer. She was the first musician ever to be awarded the Bharat Ratna, India's highest civilian honour, and also the first Indian musician to receive the Ramon Magsaysay award in 1974. She was the first Indian to perform at the United Nations General Assembly in 1966.

== Biography ==
=== Early years ===
Subbulakshmi (Kunjamma to her family) was born on 16 September 1916 in Madurai, Madras Presidency, to veena player Shanmukhavadivu Ammal and Subramania Iyer. Her grandmother Akkammal was a violinist.

She started learning Carnatic music at an early age and trained in Carnatic music under the tutelage of Semmangudi Srinivasa Iyer and subsequently in Hindustani music under Pandit Narayanrao Vyas.

Her mother, from the devadasi community, was a music exponent and a regular stage performer, and Subbulakshmi grew up in an environment very conducive to musical learning. Her musical interests were also shaped by regular interactions with Karaikudi Sambasiva Iyer, Mazhavarayanendal Subbarama Bhagavathar and Ariyakudi Ramanuja Iyengar.

Subbulakshmi gave her first public performance, at the age of eleven, in the year 1927, in the 100-pillar hall inside the Rockfort Temple, Tiruchirappalli; with Mysore Chowdiah on the violin and Dakshinamurthy Pillai on the mridangam. This was organised by the Tiruchirappalli-based Indian National Congress leader F. G. Natesa Iyer.

=== Move to Madras ===
In 1936 Subbulakshmi moved to Madras (now Chennai). She also made her film debut in Sevasadanam in 1938, opposite F. G. Natesa Iyer.

== Musical style and performance ==
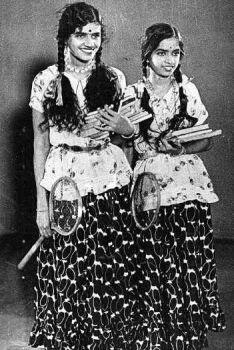
M.S. Subbulakshmi (left) with S. Varalakshmi in Sevasadhanam (1938)

=== Singing career ===
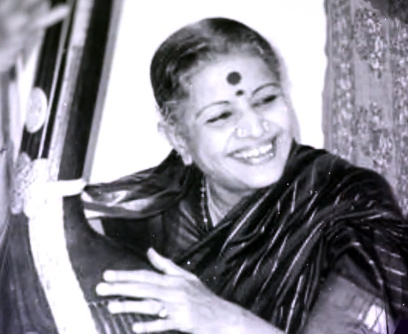
M. S. Subbulakshmi

Subbulakshmi gave her first performance at the prestigious Madras Music Academy in 1929, when she was 13 years old. The performance consisted of singing bhajans (Hindu hymns). The academy was known for its discriminating selection process, and they broke tradition by inviting a young girl as a key performer. Her performance was described as spellbinding and earned her many admirers and the moniker of musical genius from critics. Soon after her debut performances, Subbulakshmi became one of the leading Carnatic vocalists.

By the age of seventeen, Subbulakshmi was giving concerts on her own, including major performances at the Madras Music Academy. M.S., along with her husband Sadasivam trained her step-daughter Radha Vishwanathan, who accompanied her as a singer until she turned 50. Vijaya also accompanied them who played the tanpura.

She travelled to London, New York, Canada, the Far East, and other places as India's cultural ambassador. Her concerts at Edinburgh International Festival of Music and Drama in 1963; Carnegie Hall, New York; the UN General Assembly on UN day in 1966; Royal Albert Hall, London in 1982; and Festival of India in Moscow in 1987 were significant landmarks in her career.

On 21 June, 1963, Subbulakshmi recorded her iconic rendition of Venkateswara Suprabhatam at the Gramaphone Company of India. This was followed by the release of Sri Balaji Pancharatnamala, a 5-volume album dedicated to Lord Venkateswara. It also included various keerthanas written by Tallapaka Annamacharya dedicated to Lord Venkateswara and Goddess Padmavati. Subbulakshmi has also sung hymns by former saints including Tyagaraja, Muthuswami Dikshitar, Adi Shankaracharya, Meera Bai and Purandara Dasa.

In 1969 she was accompanied by Indian Railways Advisor SN Venkata Rao to Rameswaram, where she sang several songs in front of each idol in the Ramanathaswamy Temple. She shared a very cordial relation with Sree Ramaseva Mandali at Bengaluru for whom she performed 36 concerts. In 1974, Subbulakshmi was awarded the Ramon Magsaysay Award for her services in music. Alongside her contemporaries D.K. Pattammal and M.L. Vasanthakumari, she formed the "Trinity of Carnatic Music," permanently establishing women as leading vocalists capable of handling rigorous, complex classical concert structures.

After the death of her husband Kalki Sadasivam in 1997, she stopped all her public performances. Her last performance was in 1997, before her retirement from public concerts. Much of the proceeds of her concerts as well as her royalties were donated to various charities. In her 7- decade long career, M.S. made countless appearances at several concerts across the world.

Subbulakshmi died on 11 December 2004, at her home in Kotturpuram, Chennai at the age of 88 due to bronchial pneumonia and related cardiac complications following a ten-day hospital stay at St. Isabel's Hospital, Chennai for a viral infection. Her death was condoled by Indian President A. P. J. Abdul Kalam, Prime Minister Manmohan Singh, Tamil Nadu Governor Surjit Singh Barnala and Chief Minister J. Jayalalithaa.

=== Films ===
M.S. also acted in four Tamil films during her youth. Her first movie, Sevasadanam, was released on 2 May 1938. F.G. Natesa Iyer was the lead actor, opposite Subbulakshmi, in this film, directed by K. Subramanyam. It was a critical and commercial success. Ananda Vikatan favourably reviewed the film on 8 May 1938:

We should always expect something from Subramaniam's direction – for instance depiction of social ills. If we have to say only two words about this talkie based on Premchand's story it is – Go see (it).

Sevasadanam is one of the early Tamil films to be set in a contemporary social setting and to advocate reformist social policies. The film is an adapted version of Premchand's novel Bazaar-e-Husn. Veteran Marxist leader N. Sankaraiah, has described Sevasadanam as an "unusual film" for choosing the subject of marriages between young girls and old men (which had social sanction). According to him, the film successfully broughtout the "sufferings of the girl" (Subbulakshmi) and the "mental agony of the aged husband" (F.G. Natesa Iyer). Tamil film critic and historian Aranthai Narayanan observes in his book, Thamizh Cinemavin Kathai (The Story of Tamil Cinema) that "Seva Sadhanam proved a turning point in the history of Tamil cinema. In the climax, the aged husband, now a totally changed man, was shown as casting aside with utter contempt his 'sacred thread', which symbolises his Brahmin superiority. It came as a stunning blow to the then Brahmin orthodoxy."

Subbulakshmi also played the male role of Narada in Savitri (1941) to raise money for launching Kalki, her husband's nationalist Tamil weekly. Her title role of the Rajasthani saint-poetess Meera in the eponymous 1945 film gave her national prominence. This movie was re-made in Hindi in 1947.

== Filmography ==
| Year | Film | Role | Notes |
|---|---|---|---|
| 1938 | Sevasadanam | Sumathi | |
| 1940 | Sakuntalai | Shakunthala | |
| 1941 | Savithiri | Saint Narada | |
| 1945 | Meera | Meerabai | partially reshot in Hindi in 1947 |

== Awards and honours ==
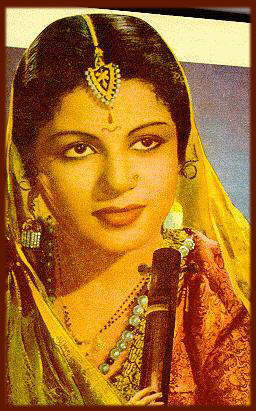
M. S. Subbulakshmi wearing a blue color saree, which became synonymous with her name – MS Blue

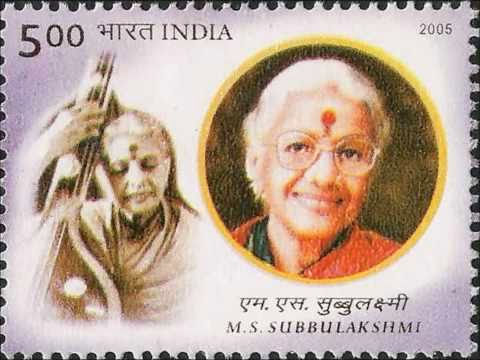
Subbulakshmi on a 2005 stamp of India

Pandit Jawaharlal Nehru had this to say about M.S. Subbulakshmi- "Who am I, a mere Prime Minister before a Queen, a Queen of Music". While Lata Mangeshkar called her Tapaswini (the Renunciate), Ustad Bade Ghulam Ali Khan termed her Suswaralakshmi (the goddess of the perfect note), and Kishori Amonkar labelled her the ultimate eighth note or Aathuvaan Sur, which is above the seven notes basic to all music. The great national leader and poet Sarojini Naidu called her "Nightingale of India". Her many famous renditions of bhajans include the chanting of Meenakshi Pancharatnam, Bhaja Govindam, Vishnu sahasranama (1000 names of Vishnu), Hari Tuma Haro and the Venkateswara Suprabhatam (musical hymns to awaken Lord Balaji early in the morning).

She was widely honoured, praised and awarded. Some of the popular ones include:

- Padma Bhushan in 1954
- Sangeet Natak Akademi Award in 1956
- Sangita Kalanidhi in 1968
- Ramon Magsaysay Award (often considered Asia's Nobel Prize) in 1974
- Padma Vibhushan in 1975
- Sangeetha Kalasikhamani in 1975 by The Indian Fine Arts Society, Chennai
- Kalidas Samman in 1988
- Indira Gandhi Award for National Integration in 1990
- Bharat Ratna in 1998

She was honoured as a resident artist Asthana Vidhwan of Tirumala Tirupati Devasthanams. Tirupati Urban Development Authority (TUDA) has installed a bronze statue of M.S. Subbulakshmi at the Poornakumbham circle in the temple town. It was unveiled by Andhra Pradesh Chief Minister Y. S. Rajasekhara Reddy on 28 May 2006. TTD's Sree Venkateswara College of Music and Dance holds an annual three-day festival dedicated to her rich legacy, where prominent artists perform.

The Kancheepuram Saree shade known as MS Blue was named after her by the well-known Congress party member and philanthropist, Sri Muthu Chettiyar when they met at the residence of Sri R. Aiyadurai and Smt. Thangam Aiyadurai at Lady Desikachari Road, Madras, who were close friends of MS and Sadasivam.

A commemorative postage stamp on her was issued on 18-December-2005. United Nations decided to issue the stamp to mark the birth centenary of M.S. Subbulakshmi. She was bestowed with enormous prize money along with the awards, most of which she donated to charity. She has given more than 200 charity concerts and raised well over Rs. 10,000,000. In 1944, her five consecutive benefit performances for Mahatma Gandhi's fund honoring his late wife brought her philanthropy to national attention. She permanently donated the royalties of her top-selling records, including the Suprabhatam, to institutions like the Veda Patasala of Tirupati. From the Sapru Memorial Fund in Lucknow in 1950, a Muslim girls’ school in remote Mangaluru and the Kashmir Flood Relief Fund in Delhi in 1959 to Ramakrishna Mission, the list of her charitable concerts is long.
